= List of Dictynidae species =

This page lists all described species of the spider family Dictynidae accepted by the World Spider Catalog as of January 2023:

== A ==
=== Adenodictyna ===
Adenodictyna Ono, 2008

- A. kudoae Ono, 2008 (type) — Japan

=== Aebutina ===
Aebutina Simon, 1892

- A. binotata Simon, 1892 (type) — Ecuador, Brazil

=== Ajmonia ===
Ajmonia Caporiacco, 1934

- A. aurita Song & Lu, 1985 — Kazakhstan, China
- A. bedeshai (Tikader, 1966) — India (mainland, Andaman Is.)
- A. capucina (Schenkel, 1936) — China
- A. lehtineni Marusik & Koponen, 1998 — Mongolia
- A. marakata (Sherriffs, 1927) — India
- A. numidica (Denis, 1937) — Algeria
- A. patellaris (Simon, 1911) — Algeria
- A. procera (Kulczyński, 1901) — China
- A. psittacea (Schenkel, 1936) — China
- A. rajaeii Zamani & Marusik, 2017 — Iran
- A. smaragdula (Simon, 1905) — Sri Lanka
- A. velifera (Simon, 1906) (type) — India to China

=== Altella ===
Altella Simon, 1884

- A. aussereri Thaler, 1990 — Italy
- A. biuncata (Miller, 1949) — Central Europe
- A. caspia Ponomarev, 2008 — Kazakhstan
- A. conglobata Dyal, 1935 — Pakistan
- A. hungarica Loksa, 1981 — Hungary, Ukraine, Russia (Europe)
- A. lucida (Simon, 1874) (type) — Europe, Turkey
- A. media Wunderlich, 1992 — Canary Is.
- A. opaca Simon, 1911 — Algeria
- A. orientalis Balogh, 1935 — Hungary
- A. pygmaea Wunderlich, 1992 — Canary Is.
- A. uncata Simon, 1884 — Algeria

=== Anaxibia ===
Anaxibia Thorell, 1898

- A. caudiculata Thorell, 1898 (type) — Myanmar
- A. difficilis (Kraus, 1960) — São Tomé and Príncipe
- A. folia Sankaran & Sebastian, 2017 — India
- A. nigricauda (Simon, 1905) — Sri Lanka
- A. peteri (Lessert, 1933) — Angola
- A. pictithorax (Kulczyński, 1908) — Indonesia (Java)
- A. rebai (Tikader, 1966) — India (mainland, Andaman Is.)

=== Arangina ===
Arangina Lehtinen, 1967

- A. cornigera (Dalmas, 1917) (type) — New Zealand
- A. pluva Forster, 1970 — New Zealand

=== Archaeodictyna ===
Archaeodictyna Caporiacco, 1928

- A. ammophila (Menge, 1871) — Europe to Central Asia
- A. anguiniceps (Simon, 1899) (type) — North, East Africa
- A. condocta (O. Pickard-Cambridge, 1876) — North Africa, Kazakhstan
- A. consecuta (O. Pickard-Cambridge, 1872) — Europe, Caucasus, Russia (Europe to South Siberia), Iran, Central Asia, China
- A. minutissima (Miller, 1958) — Italy, Austria, Czechia, Slovakia, Ukraine, Russia (Europe)
- A. sexnotata (Simon, 1890) — Yemen
- A. suedicola (Simon, 1890) — Yemen
- A. tazzeiti (Denis, 1954) — Algeria
- A. ulova Griswold & Meikle-Griswold, 1987 — South Africa

=== Arctella ===
Arctella Holm, 1945

- A. lapponica Holm, 1945 (type) — Scandinavia, Russia (Europe to Far East), Mongolia, USA (Alaska), Canada

=== Argenna ===
Argenna Thorell, 1870

- A. obesa Emerton, 1911 — USA, Canada
- A. patula (Simon, 1874) — Europe, Caucasus, Russia (Europe to South Siberia), Kyrgyzstan, China, Iran?
- A. polita (Banks, 1898) — Mexico
- A. sibirica Esyunin & Stepina, 2014 — Russia (West Siberia)
- A. subnigra (O. Pickard-Cambridge, 1861) (type) — Europe, Azerbaijan, China
- A. yakima Chamberlin & Gertsch, 1958 — USA
- † A. fossilis Petrunkevitch, 1957

=== Argennina ===
Argennina Gertsch & Mulaik, 1936

- A. unica Gertsch & Mulaik, 1936 (type) — USA

=== Argyroneta ===
Argyroneta

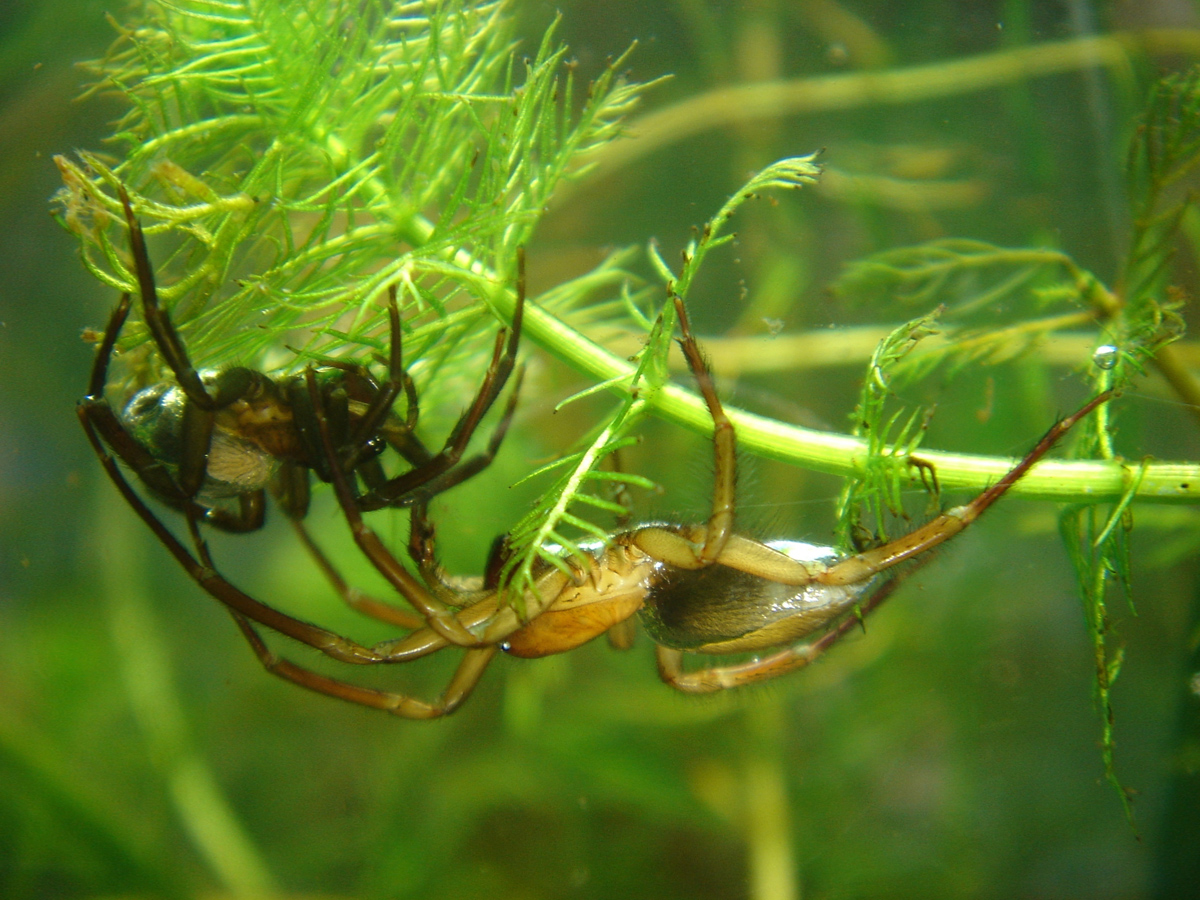
Diving bell spider
(Argyroneta aquatica)

Argyroneta Latreille, 1804

- A. aquatica (Clerck, 1757) (type) — Europe, Turkey, Caucasus, Russia (Europe to Far East), Iran, Central Asia, Mongolia, China, Korea, Japan
- † A. longipes Heer, 1865

=== † Arthrodictyna ===
† Arthrodictyna Petrunkevitch, 1942

- † A. segmentata Petrunkevitch, 1942

=== Atelolathys ===
Atelolathys Simon, 1892

- A. varia Simon, 1892 (type) — Sri Lanka

== B ==
=== † Balticocryphoeca ===
† Balticocryphoeca Wunderlich, 2004

- † B. curvitarsis Wunderlich, 2004

=== Banaidja ===
Banaidja Lehtinen, 1967

- B. bifasciata (L. Koch, 1872) (type) — Samoa

=== Bannaella ===
Bannaella Zhang & Li, 2011

- B. lhasana (Hu, 2001) — China
- B. sinuata Zhang & Li, 2011 — China
- B. tibialis Zhang & Li, 2011 (type) — China

=== Brigittea ===
Brigittea

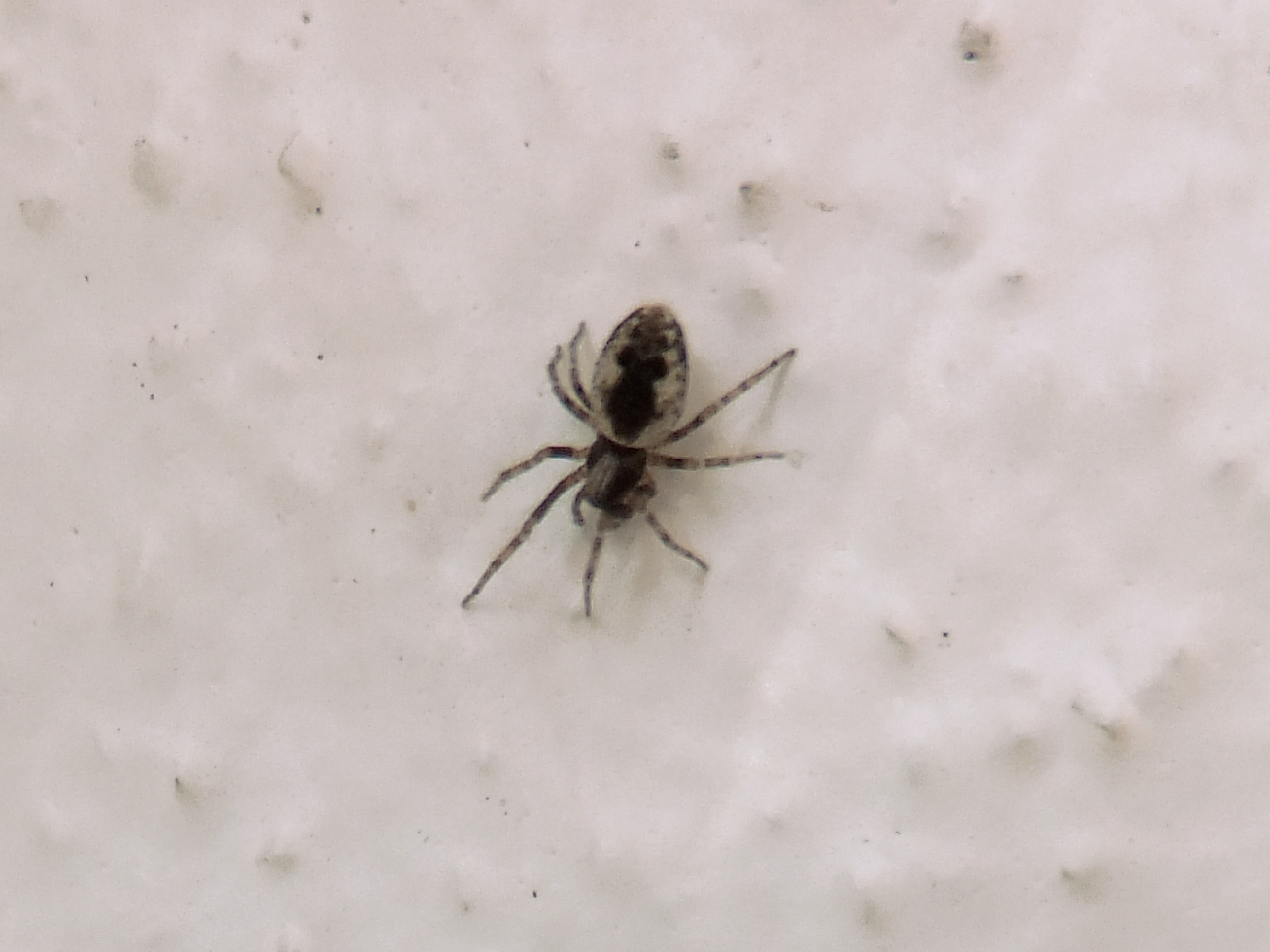
Brigittea civica

Brigittea Lehtinen, 1967

- B. avicenna Zamani & Marusik, 2021 — Iran
- B. civica (Lucas, 1850) — Europe, North Africa, Turkey, Iran. Introduced to North America
- B. innocens (O. Pickard-Cambridge, 1872) — Italy, Eastern Mediterranean, Kazakhstan
- B. latens (Fabricius, 1775) (type) — Europe to Central Asia
- B. varians (Spassky, 1952) — Russia (Europe), Kazakhstan, Tajikistan
- B. vicina (Simon, 1873) — Mediterranean to Central Asia

=== † Brommellina ===
† Brommellina Wunderlich, 2004

- † B. longungulae Wunderlich, 2004

== C ==
=== Callevophthalmus ===
Callevophthalmus Simon, 1906

- C. albus (Keyserling, 1890) (type) — Australia (mainland, Lord Howe Is.)
- C. maculatus (Keyserling, 1890) — Australia (New South Wales)

=== Chaerea ===
Chaerea Simon, 1884

- C. maritimus Simon, 1884 (type) — Algeria, Spain, France, Italy, Greece

=== † Chelicirrum ===
† Chelicirrum Wunderlich, 2004

- † C. stridulans Wunderlich, 2004

=== Clitistes ===
Clitistes Simon, 1902

- C. velutinus Simon, 1902 (type) — Chile

=== † Cryphoezaga ===
† Cryphoezaga Wunderlich, 2004

- † C. dubia Wunderlich, 2004

== D ==
=== Devade ===
Devade Simon, 1884

- D. dubia Caporiacco, 1934 — Karakorum
- D. indistincta (O. Pickard-Cambridge, 1872) (type) — Mediterranean
- D. kazakhstanica Esyunin & Efimik, 2000 — Kazakhstan
- D. lehtineni Esyunin & Efimik, 2000 — Kazakhstan
- D. libanica (Denis, 1955) — Lebanon
- D. miranda Ponomarev, 2007 — Kazakhstan
- D. mongolica Esyunin & Marusik, 2001 — Mongolia
- D. naderii Zamani & Marusik, 2017 — Iran
- D. pusilla Simon, 1911 — Algeria
- D. tenella (Tystshenko, 1965) — Ukraine to China, Iran

=== Dictyna ===
Dictyna

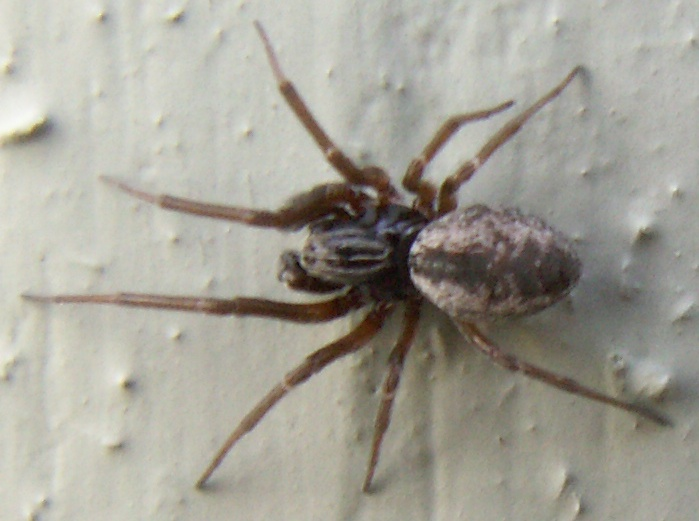
Dictyna arundinacea

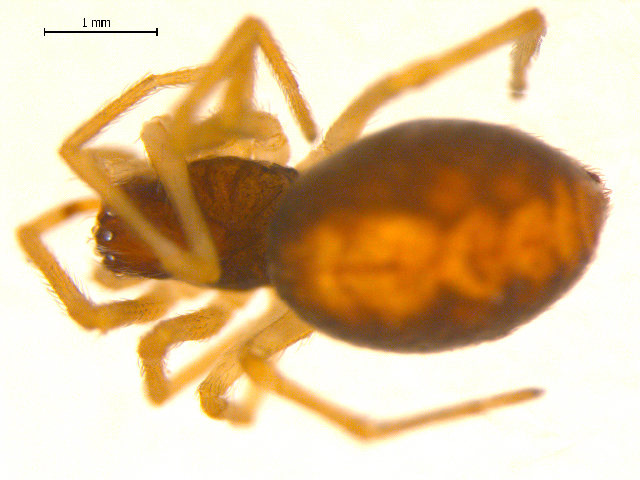
Dictyna foliacea

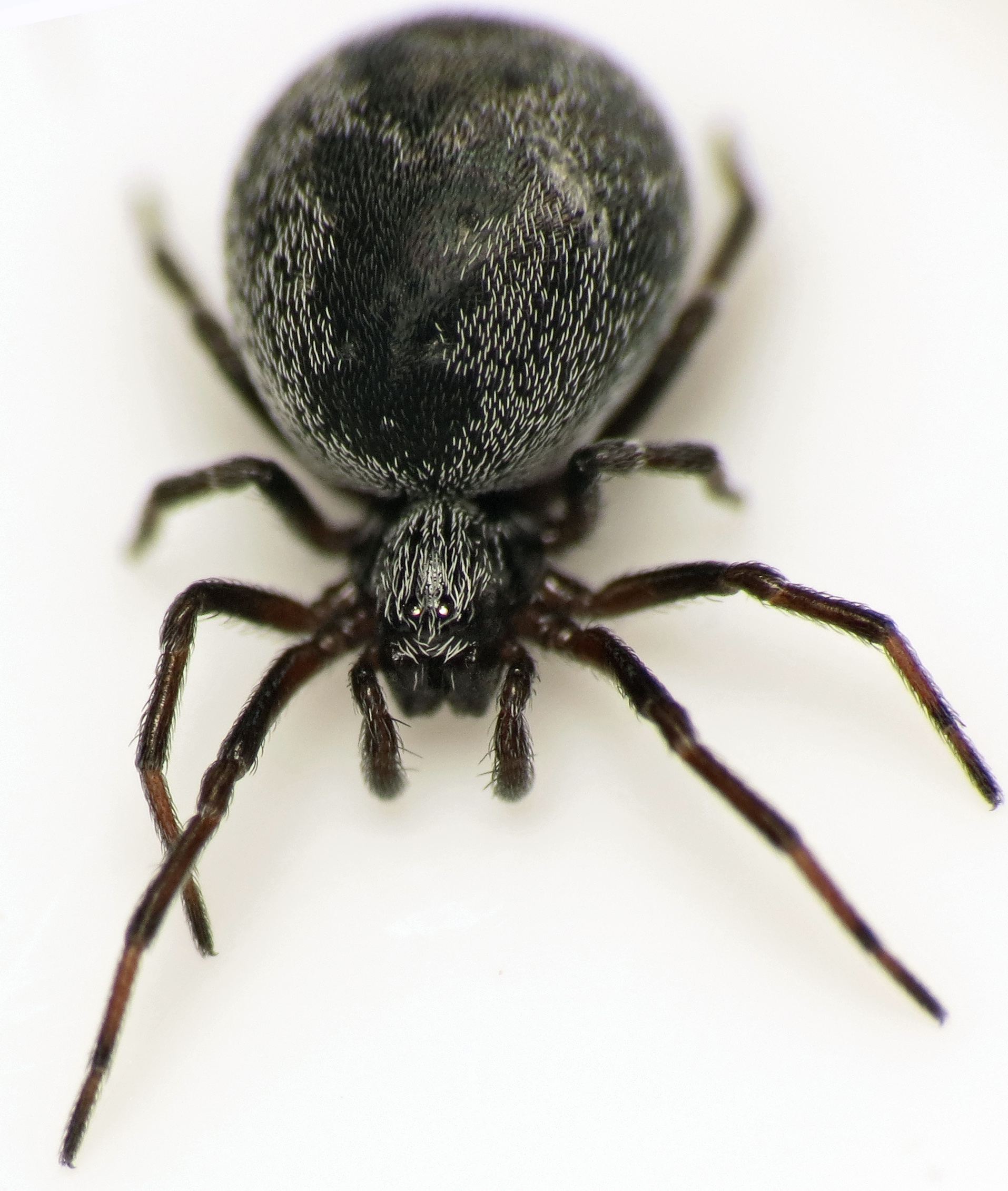
Dictyna latens, female

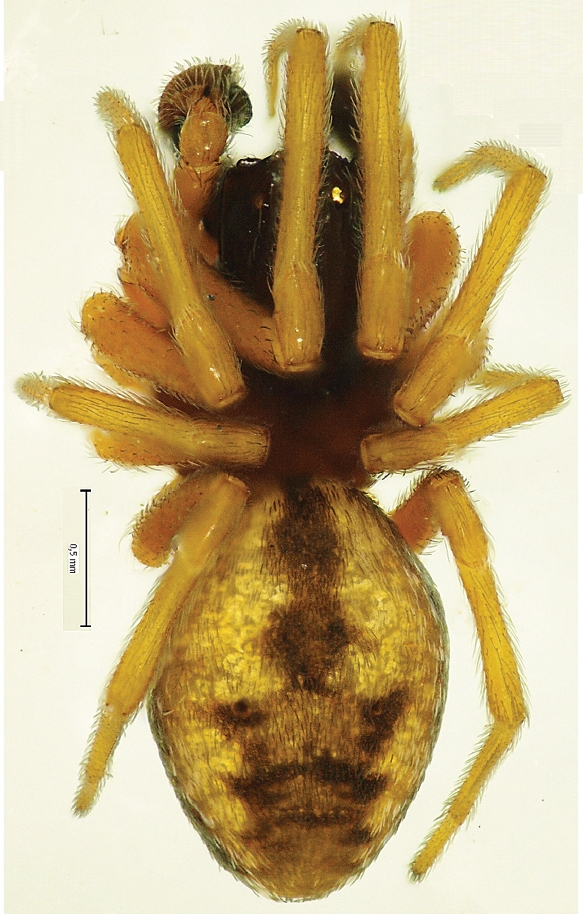
Dictyna major, male

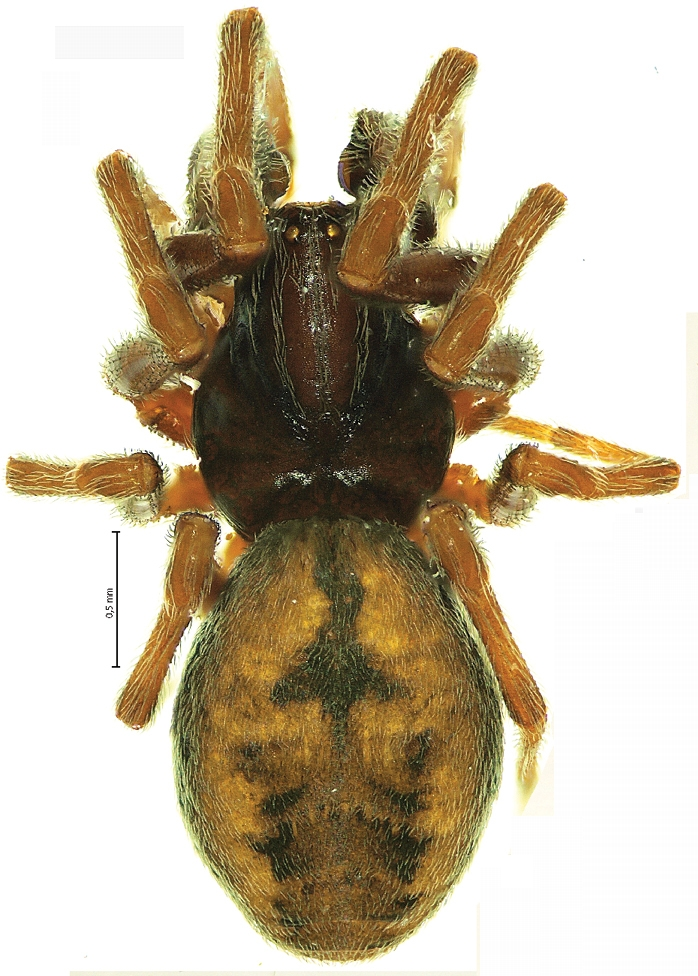
Dictyna palmgreni, male

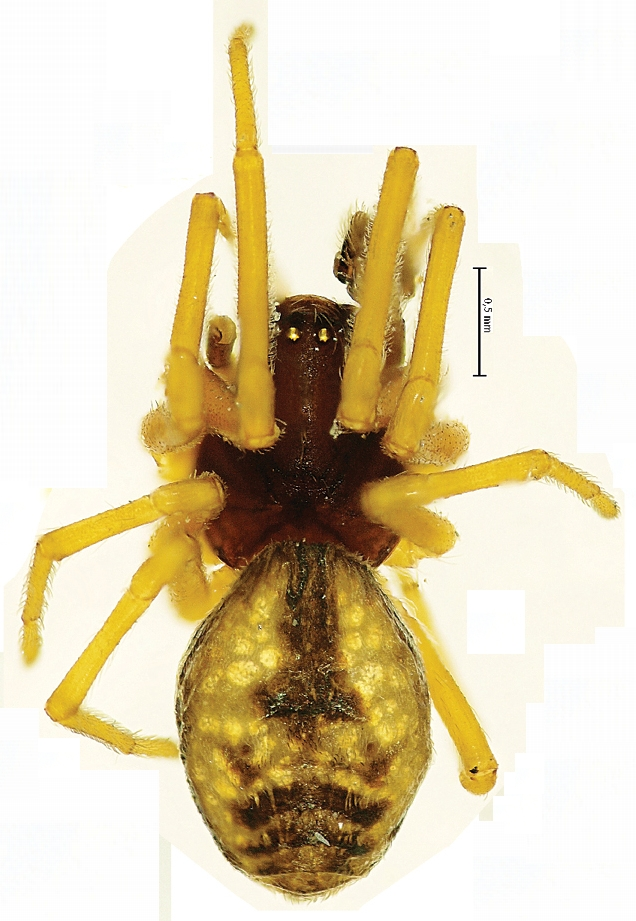
Dictyna schmidti

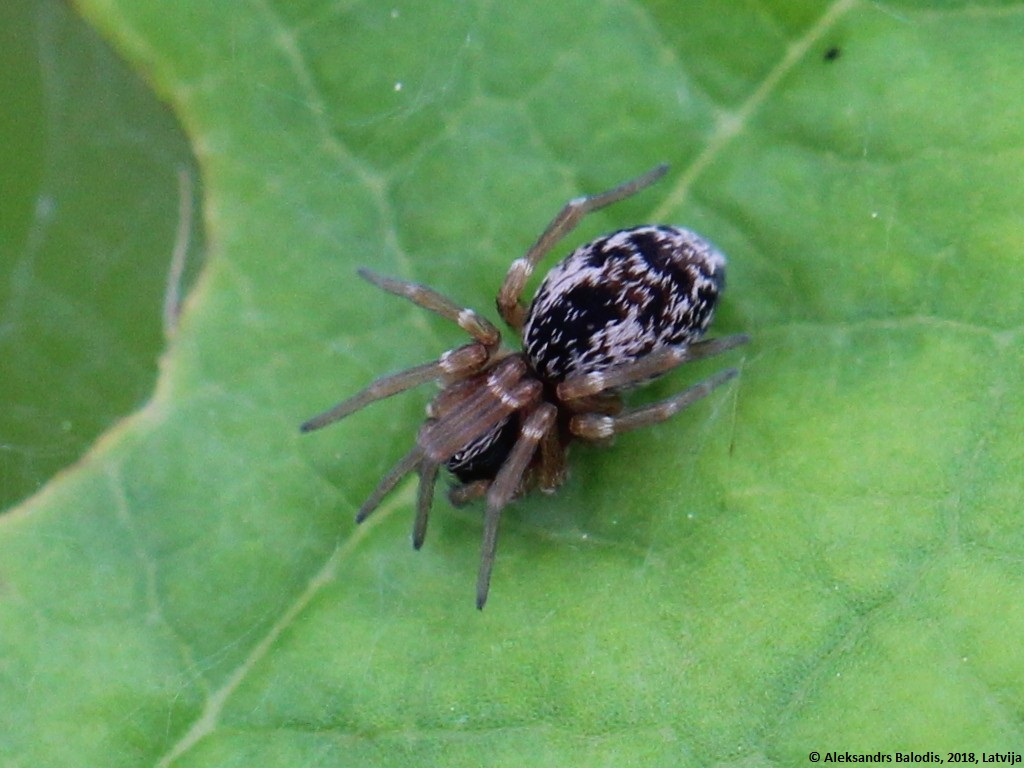
Dictyna uncinata

Dictyna Sundevall, 1833

- D. abundans Chamberlin & Ivie, 1941 — USA
- D. agressa Ivie, 1947 — USA
- D. aguasverdes Wunderlich, 2022 — Canary Islands
- D. alaskae Chamberlin & Ivie, 1947 — North America, Northern Europe, Russia (Europe to Far East)
- D. albicoma Simon, 1893 — Venezuela
- D. albopilosa Franganillo, 1936 — Cuba
- D. albovittata Keyserling, 1881 — Peru
- D. alyceae Chickering, 1950 — Panama
- D. andesiana Berland, 1913 — Ecuador
- D. annexa Gertsch & Mulaik, 1936 — USA, Mexico
- D. apacheca Chamberlin & Ivie, 1935 — USA
- D. armata Thorell, 1875 — Ukraine, Russia (Europe, Caucasus)
- D. arundinacea (Linnaeus, 1758) (type) — North America, Europe, Turkey, Caucasus, Russia (Europe to Far East), Iran, Central Asia, China, Korea, Japan
- D. bellans Chamberlin, 1919 — USA, Mexico
  - D. b. hatchi Jones, 1948 — USA
- D. betancuria Wunderlich, 2022 — Canary Islands
- D. bispinosa Simon, 1906 — Myanmar
- D. bostoniensis Emerton, 1888 — USA, Canada
- D. brevitarsa Emerton, 1915 — USA, Canada
- D. cafayate Mello-Leitão, 1941 — Argentina
- D. calcarata Banks, 1904 — USA, Mexico. Introduced to Hawaii
- D. cambridgei Gertsch & Ivie, 1936 — Mexico
- D. cavata Jones, 1947 — USA, Cuba
- D. cebolla Ivie, 1947 — USA
- D. chandrai Tikader, 1966 — India
- D. cholla Gertsch & Davis, 1942 — USA, Mexico
- D. cofete Wunderlich, 2022 — Canary Islands
- D. colona Simon, 1906 — New Caledonia
- D. coloradensis Chamberlin, 1919 — USA
- D. columbiana Becker, 1886 — Venezuela
- D. cronebergi Simon, 1889 — Turkmenistan
- D. crosbyi Gertsch & Mulaik, 1940 — USA
- D. dahurica Danilov, 2000 — Russia (South Siberia)
- D. dauna Chamberlin & Gertsch, 1958 — USA, Bahama Is.
- D. denisi (Lehtinen, 1967) — Niger
- D. donaldi Chickering, 1950 — Panama
- D. dunini Danilov, 2000 — Russia (Urals to Far East)
- D. ectrapela (Keyserling, 1886) — Peru
- D. felis Bösenberg & Strand, 1906 — Russia (Far East), Mongolia, China, Korea, Japan
- D. fluminensis Mello-Leitão, 1924 — Brazil
- D. foliacea (Hentz, 1850) — USA, Canada
- D. foliicola Bösenberg & Strand, 1906 — Russia (Far East), China, Korea, Japan
- D. formidolosa Gertsch & Ivie, 1936 — USA, Canada
- D. fuerteventurensis Schmidt, 1976 — Canary Is.
- D. gloria Chamberlin & Ivie, 1944 — USA
- D. guerrerensis Gertsch & Davis, 1937 — Mexico
- D. guineensis Denis, 1955 — Guinea
- D. hamifera Thorell, 1872 — Greenland, Finland, Russia (Siberia)
  - D. h. simulans Kulczyński, 1916 — Russia (West Siberia)
- D. idahoana Chamberlin & Ivie, 1933 — USA
- D. incredula Gertsch & Davis, 1937 — Mexico
- D. jacalana Gertsch & Davis, 1937 — Mexico
- D. juno Ivie, 1947 — USA
- D. kosiorowiczi Simon, 1873 — Western Mediterranean
- D. laeviceps Simon, 1911 — Algeria
- D. lanzarotensis Wunderlich, 2022 — Canary Islands
- D. lecta Chickering, 1952 — Panama
- D. linzhiensis Hu, 2001 — China
- D. livida (Mello-Leitão, 1941) — Argentina
- D. longispina Emerton, 1888 — USA
- D. major Menge, 1869 — North America, Europe, Russia (Europe to Far East), Tajikistan, China
- D. marilina Chamberlin, 1948 — USA, Mexico
- D. meditata Gertsch, 1936 — Mexico to Panama, Cuba
- D. miniata Banks, 1898 — Mexico
- D. minuta Emerton, 1888 — USA, Canada
- D. moctezuma Gertsch & Davis, 1942 — Mexico
- D. mora Chamberlin & Gertsch, 1958 — USA
- D. namulinensis Hu, 2001 — China
- D. navajoa Gertsch & Davis, 1942 — Mexico
- D. nebraska Gertsch, 1946 — USA
- D. obydovi Marusik & Koponen, 1998 — Russia (South Siberia)
- D. ottoi Marusik & Koponen, 2017 — Caucasus (Russia, Georgia, Azerbaijan), Iran?
- D. palmgreni Marusik & Fritzén, 2011 — Finland, Russia (Europe to north-eastern Siberia)
- D. paramajor Danilov, 2000 — Russia (South Siberia)
- D. peon Chamberlin & Gertsch, 1958 — USA, Mexico
- D. personata Gertsch & Mulaik, 1936 — USA, Mexico
- D. pictella Chamberlin & Gertsch, 1958 — USA
- D. procerula Bösenberg & Strand, 1906 — Japan
- D. puebla Gertsch & Davis, 1937 — Mexico
- D. pusilla Thorell, 1856 — Europe, Turkey, Caucasus, Russia (Europe to Far East), Central Asia
- D. quadrispinosa Emerton, 1919 — USA
- D. ranchograndei Caporiacco, 1955 — Venezuela
- D. saepei Chamberlin & Ivie, 1941 — USA
- D. saltona Chamberlin & Gertsch, 1958 — USA
- D. sancta Gertsch, 1946 — USA, Canada
- D. schmidti Kulczyński, 1926 — Russia (West Siberia to Far East)
- D. secuta Chamberlin, 1924 — USA, Mexico
- D. sierra Chamberlin, 1948 — USA, Mexico
- D. similis Keyserling, 1878 — Uruguay
- D. simoni Petrunkevitch, 1911 — Venezuela
- D. sinaloa Gertsch & Davis, 1942 — Mexico
- D. siniloanensis Barrion & Litsinger, 1995 — Philippines
- D. sinuata Esyunin & Sozontov, 2016 — Ukraine, Russia (Europe)
- D. sonora Gertsch & Davis, 1942 — Mexico
- D. sotnik Danilov, 1994 — Russia (South Siberia)
- D. subpinicola Ivie, 1947 — USA
- D. sylvania Chamberlin & Ivie, 1944 — USA
- D. szaboi Chyzer, 1891 — Austria, Hungary, Czechia, Slovakia, Russia (Europe), Kazakhstan
- D. tarda Schmidt, 1971 — Ecuador
- D. terrestris Emerton, 1911 — USA
- D. togata Simon, 1904 — Chile
- D. tridentata Bishop & Ruderman, 1946 — USA
- D. trivirgata Mello-Leitão, 1943 — Chile
- D. tucsona Chamberlin, 1948 — USA, Mexico
- D. tullgreni Caporiacco, 1949 — Kenya
- D. turbida Simon, 1905 — India, Sri Lanka
- D. tyshchenkoi Marusik, 1988 — Russia (Urals to Far East)
  - D. t. wrangeliana Marusik, 1988 — Russia (Wrangel Is.)
- D. ubsunurica Marusik & Koponen, 1998 — Russia (South Siberia)
- D. umai Tikader, 1966 — India
- D. uncinata Thorell, 1856 — Europe, Turkey, Caucasus, Russia (Europe to Far East), Central Asia, China, Japan
- D. uvs Marusik & Koponen, 1998 — Russia (South Siberia)
- D. vittata Keyserling, 1883 — Peru
- D. volucripes Keyserling, 1881 — North America
  - D. v. volucripoides Ivie, 1947 — USA
- D. vultuosa Keyserling, 1881 — Peru
- D. xizangensis Hu & Li, 1987 — China
- D. yongshun Yin, Bao & Kim, 2001 — China
- D. zhangmuensis Hu, 2001 — China
- † D. rufa Wunderlich, 2012

=== Dictynomorpha ===
Dictynomorpha Spassky, 1939

- D. daemonis Marusik, Esyunin & Tuneva, 2015 — Kazakhstan
- D. strandi Spassky, 1939 (type) — Kazakhstan, Uzbekistan, Turkmenistan, Kyrgyzstan

== E ==
=== Emblyna ===
Emblyna Chamberlin, 1948

- E. acoreensis Wunderlich, 1992 — Azores
- E. aiko (Chamberlin & Gertsch, 1958) — USA
- E. altamira (Gertsch & Davis, 1942) — USA, Mexico, Greater Antilles
- E. angulata (Emerton, 1915) — USA
- E. annulipes (Blackwall, 1846) — North America, Europe, Turkey, Caucasus, Russia (Europe to Far East)
- E. ardea (Chamberlin & Gertsch, 1958) — USA
- E. artemisia (Ivie, 1947) — USA
- E. borealis (O. Pickard-Cambridge, 1877) — Russia (north-eastern Siberia), USA, Canada, Greenland
  - E. b. cavernosa (Jones, 1947) — USA
- E. branchi (Chamberlin & Gertsch, 1958) — USA
- E. brevidens (Kulczyński, 1897) — Europe
- E. budarini Marusik, 1988 — Russia (north-eastern Siberia)
- E. burjatica (Danilov, 1994) — Russia (Urals to Far East)
- E. callida (Gertsch & Ivie, 1936) — USA, Mexico
- E. canadas Wunderlich, 2022 — Canary Islands
- E. capens Chamberlin, 1948 — USA
- E. chitina (Chamberlin & Gertsch, 1958) — USA (Alaska), Canada
- E. completa (Chamberlin & Gertsch, 1929) (type) — USA
- E. completoides (Ivie, 1947) — USA, Canada
- E. consulta (Gertsch & Ivie, 1936) — North America
- E. cornupeta (Bishop & Ruderman, 1946) — USA, Mexico
- E. coweta (Chamberlin & Gertsch, 1958) — USA
- E. crocana Chamberlin, 1948 — USA
- E. cruciata (Emerton, 1888) — USA, Canada
- E. decaprini (Kaston, 1945) — USA
- E. evicta (Gertsch & Mulaik, 1940) — USA
- E. florens (Ivie & Barrows, 1935) — USA
- E. formicaria Baert, 1987 — Ecuador (Galapagos Is.)
- E. francisca (Bishop & Ruderman, 1946) — USA
- E. hentzi (Kaston, 1945) — USA, Canada
- E. horta (Gertsch & Ivie, 1936) — USA
- E. hoya (Chamberlin & Ivie, 1941) — USA
- E. iviei (Gertsch & Mulaik, 1936) — USA, Mexico
- E. joaquina (Chamberlin & Gertsch, 1958) — USA
- E. jonesae (Roewer, 1955) — USA
- E. kaszabi Marusik & Koponen, 1998 — Mongolia
- E. klamatha (Chamberlin & Gertsch, 1958) — USA
- E. lina (Gertsch, 1946) — USA, Mexico
- E. linda (Chamberlin & Gertsch, 1958) — USA
- E. littoricolens (Chamberlin & Ivie, 1935) — USA
- E. manitoba (Ivie, 1947) — USA, Canada
- E. marissa (Chamberlin & Gertsch, 1958) — USA
- E. maxima (Banks, 1892) — USA, Canada
- E. melva (Chamberlin & Gertsch, 1958) — USA
- E. mitis (Thorell, 1875) — Norway, Germany, Czechia, Hungary, Romania
- E. mongolica Marusik & Koponen, 1998 — Russia (Europe to South Siberia), Mongolia
- E. nanda (Chamberlin & Gertsch, 1958) — USA
- E. oasa (Ivie, 1947) — USA
- E. olympiana (Chamberlin, 1919) — USA
- E. orbiculata (Jones, 1947) — USA
- E. oregona (Gertsch, 1946) — USA
- E. osceola (Chamberlin & Gertsch, 1958) — USA
- E. oxtotilpanensis (Jiménez & Luz, 1986) — Mexico
- E. palomara Chamberlin, 1948 — USA
- E. peragrata (Bishop & Ruderman, 1946) — USA, Canada
- E. phylax (Gertsch & Ivie, 1936) — USA, Canada
- E. pinalia (Chamberlin & Gertsch, 1958) — USA
- E. piratica (Ivie, 1947) — USA
- E. reticulata (Gertsch & Ivie, 1936) — USA, Mexico
- E. roscida (Hentz, 1850) — North, Central America
- E. saylori (Chamberlin & Ivie, 1941) — USA
- E. scotta Chamberlin, 1948 — USA, Mexico
- E. seminola (Chamberlin & Gertsch, 1958) — USA
- E. serena (Chamberlin & Gertsch, 1958) — USA
- E. shasta (Chamberlin & Gertsch, 1958) — USA
- E. shoshonea (Chamberlin & Gertsch, 1958) — USA
- E. stulta (Gertsch & Mulaik, 1936) — USA
- E. sublata (Hentz, 1850) — Canada, USA, Mexico
- E. sublatoides (Ivie & Barrows, 1935) — USA
- E. suprenans (Chamberlin & Ivie, 1935) — USA
- E. suwanea (Gertsch, 1946) — USA
- E. teideensis Wunderlich, 1992 — Canary Is.
- E. uintana (Chamberlin, 1919) — USA
- E. wangi (Song & Zhou, 1986) — Russia (Europe to South Siberia), Kazakhstan, Mongolia, China
- E. zaba (Barrows & Ivie, 1942) — USA
- E. zherikhini (Marusik, 1988) — Russia (Middle Siberia to Far East)

=== † Eobrommella ===
† Eobrommella Wunderlich, 2004

- † E. scutata Wunderlich, 2004

=== † Eocryphoeca ===
† Eocryphoeca Petrunkevitch, 1946

- † E. bitterfeldensis Wunderlich, 2004
- † E. electrina Wunderlich, 2004
- † E. falcata Wunderlich, 2004
- † E. gibbifera Wunderlich, 2004
- † E. gracilipes Koch and Berendt, 1854
- † E. ligula Wunderlich, 2004
- † E. mammilla Wunderlich, 2004
- † E. splendens Wunderlich, 2004

=== † Eocryphoecara ===
† Eocryphoecara Wunderlich, 2004

- † E. abicera Wunderlich, 2004

=== † Eodictyna ===
† Eodictyna Wunderlich, 2004

- † E. communis Wunderlich, 2004

=== † Eolathys ===
† Eolathys Petrunkevitch, 1950

- † E. debilis Petrunkevitch, 1950
- † E. succini Petrunkevitch, 1950

== F ==
=== † Flagelldictyna ===
† Flagelldictyna Wunderlich, 2012

- † F. copalis Wunderlich, 2012

=== Funny ===
Funny Lin & Li, 2022

- F. valentine Lin & Li, 2022 — China

== G ==
=== † Gibbermastigusa ===
† Gibbermastigusa Wunderlich, 2004

- † G. lateralis Wunderlich, 2004

== H ==
=== Hackmania ===
Hackmania Lehtinen, 1967

- H. prominula (Tullgren, 1948) (type) — North America, Northern Europe, Russia (Europe to Far East)
- H. saphes (Chamberlin, 1948) — USA

=== Helenactyna ===
Helenactyna Benoit, 1977

- H. crucifera (O. Pickard-Cambridge, 1873) (type) — St. Helena
- H. vicina Benoit, 1977 — St. Helena

=== † Hispaniolyna ===
† Hispaniolyna Wunderlich, 1988

- † H. hirsuta Wunderlich, 1988
- † H. magna Wunderlich, 1988

=== Hoplolathys ===
Hoplolathys Caporiacco, 1947

- H. aethiopica Caporiacco, 1947 (type) — Ethiopia

== I ==
=== Iviella ===
Iviella Lehtinen, 1967

- I. newfoundlandensis Pickavance & Dondale, 2010 — Canada
- I. ohioensis (Chamberlin & Ivie, 1935) (type) — USA
- I. reclusa (Gertsch & Ivie, 1936) — USA, Canada

== K ==
=== Kharitonovia ===
Kharitonovia Esyunin, Zamani & Tuneva, 2017

- K. uzbekistanica (Charitonov, 1946) (type) — Iran, Uzbekistan

== L ==
=== Lathys ===
Lathys

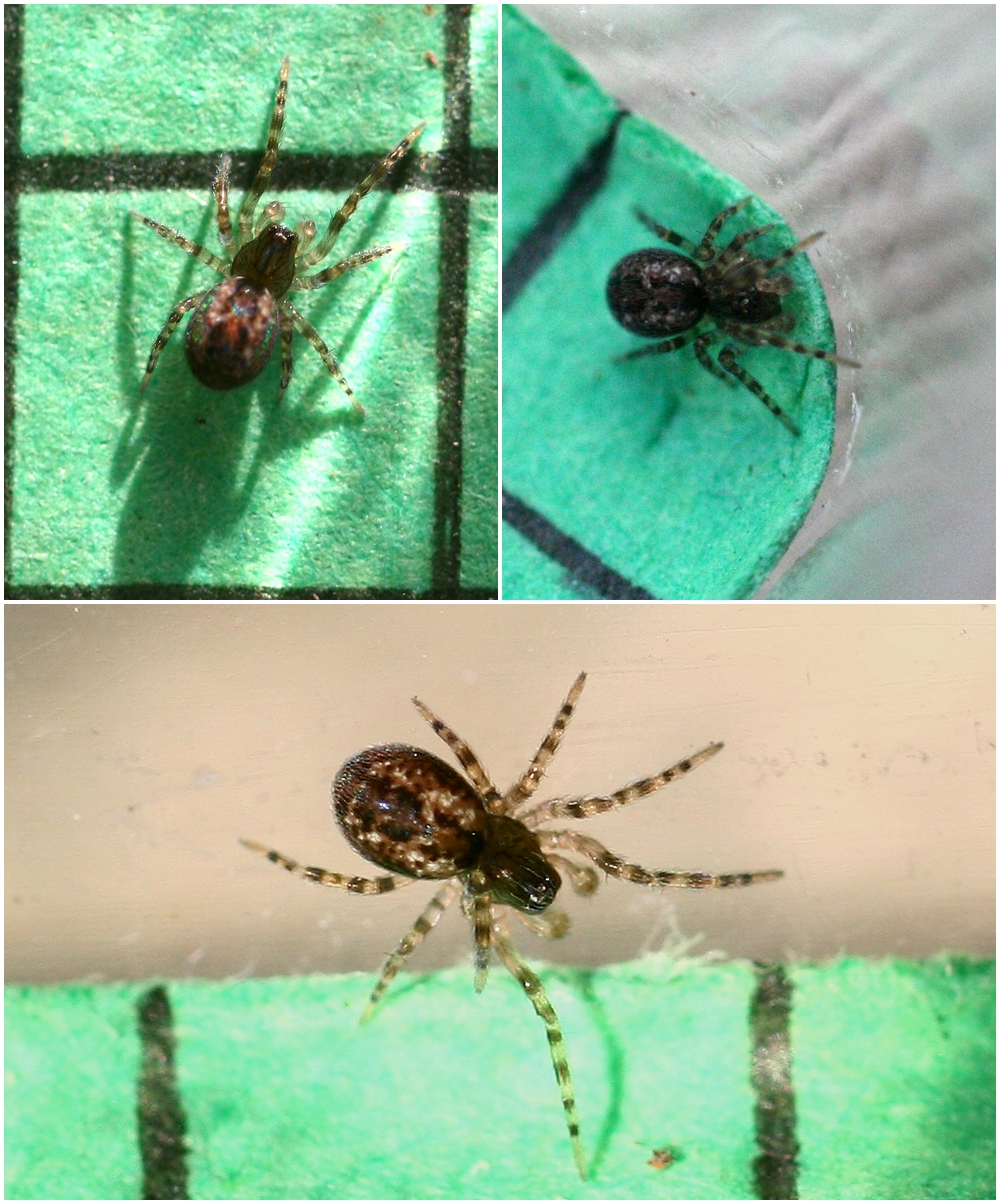
Lathys humilis

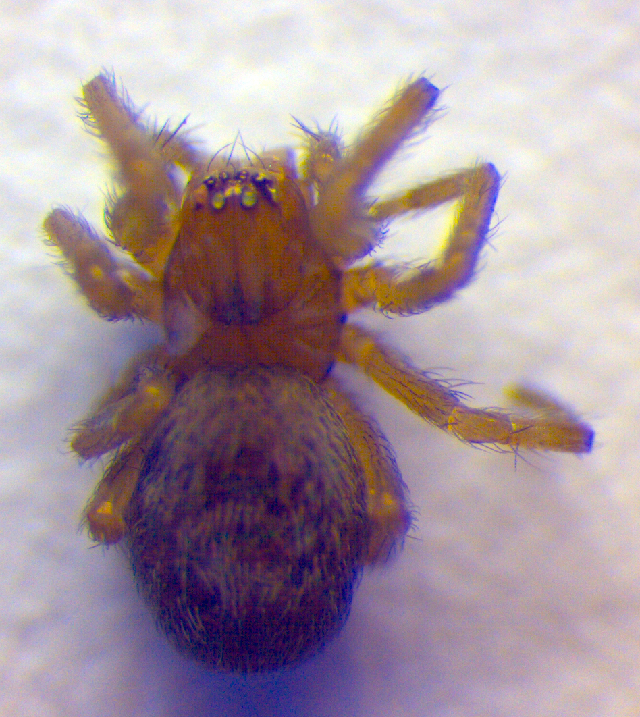
Lathys stigmatisata

Lathys Simon, 1884

- L. adunca Liu, 2018 — China
- L. affinis (Blackwall, 1862) — Madeira, Portugal?
- L. alberta Gertsch, 1946 — USA, Canada, Russia (South Siberia to Far East)
- L. albida Gertsch, 1946 — USA
- L. ankaraensis Özkütük, Marusik, Elverici & Kunt, 2016 — Turkey
- L. annulata Bösenberg & Strand, 1906 — Korea, Japan
- L. arabs Simon, 1910 — Algeria, Tunisia, Greece, Cyprus
- L. bin Marusik & Logunov, 1991 — Russia (Kurile Is.)
- L. borealis Zhang, Hu & Zhang, 2012 — China
- L. brevitibialis Denis, 1956 — Morocco
- L. cambridgei (Simon, 1874) — Israel
- L. changtunesis Hu, 2001 — China
- L. chishuiensis Zhang, Yang & Zhang, 2009 — China
- L. coralynae Gertsch & Davis, 1942 — Mexico
- L. delicatula (Gertsch & Mulaik, 1936) — USA
- L. deltoidea Liu, 2018 — China
- L. dentichelis (Simon, 1883) — Azores, Canary Is.
- L. dihamata Paik, 1979 — Korea, Japan
- L. dixiana Ivie & Barrows, 1935 — USA
- L. fibulata Liu, 2018 — China
- L. foxi (Marx, 1891) — USA
- L. heterophthalma Kulczyński, 1891 — Europe, Russia (Europe to West Siberia)
- L. huangyangjieensis Liu, 2018 — China
- L. humilis (Blackwall, 1855) (type) — Europe, Turkey, Caucasus, Iran, Central Asia. Introduced to Canada
  - L. h. meridionalis (Simon, 1874) — Spain, France (mainland, Corsica), North Africa
- L. immaculata (Chamberlin & Ivie, 1944) — USA
- L. inaffecta Li, 2017 — China
- L. insulana Ono, 2003 — Japan
- L. jubata (Denis, 1947) — France
- L. lehtineni Kovblyuk, Kastrygina & Omelko, 2014 — Ukraine, Russia (Europe), Iran?
- L. lepida O. Pickard-Cambridge, 1909 — Spain
- L. maculina Gertsch, 1946 — USA
- L. maculosa (Karsch, 1879) — Korea, Japan
- L. mallorcensis Lissner, 2018 — Spain (Majorca)
- L. mantarota Wunderlich, 2022 — Portugal
- L. maura (Simon, 1911) — Algeria
- L. narbonensis (Simon, 1876) — France, Italy
- L. pallida (Marx, 1891) — USA, Canada
- L. pygmaea Wunderlich, 2011 — Canary Is.
- L. sexoculata Seo & Sohn, 1984 — Korea, Japan
- L. sexpustulata (Simon, 1878) — France, Morocco
- L. simplicior (Dalmas, 1916) — Algeria
- L. sindi (Caporiacco, 1934) — Karakorum
- L. spasskyi Andreeva & Tystshenko, 1969 — Turkey, Azerbaijan, Kazakhstan, Uzbekistan, Kyrgyzstan, Tajikistan
- L. spiralis Zhang, Hu & Zhang, 2012 — China
- L. stigmatisata (Menge, 1869) — Europe, Turkey
- L. subalberta Zhang, Hu & Zhang, 2012 — China
- L. subhumilis Zhang, Hu & Zhang, 2012 — China
- L. subviridis Denis, 1937 — Algeria
- L. sylvania Chamberlin & Gertsch, 1958 — USA
- L. teideensis Wunderlich, 1992 — Canary Is.
- L. truncata Danilov, 1994 — Russia (Central Asia, South Siberia), Kazakhstan
- L. zhanfengi Liu, 2018 — China

== M ==
=== Mallos ===
Mallos O. Pickard-Cambridge, 1902

- M. blandus Chamberlin & Gertsch, 1958 — USA
- M. bryanti Gertsch, 1946 — USA, Mexico
- M. chamberlini Bond & Opell, 1997 — Mexico
- M. dugesi (Becker, 1886) — USA, Mexico
- M. flavovittatus (Keyserling, 1881) — Venezuela, Peru
- M. gertschi Bond & Opell, 1997 — Mexico
- M. gregalis (Simon, 1909) — Mexico
- M. hesperius (Chamberlin, 1916) — Mexico to Paraguay
- M. kraussi Gertsch, 1946 — Mexico
- M. macrolirus Bond & Opell, 1997 — Mexico
- M. margaretae Gertsch, 1946 — Costa Rica, Panama
- M. mians (Chamberlin, 1919) — USA, Mexico
- M. nigrescens (Caporiacco, 1955) — Venezuela
- M. niveus O. Pickard-Cambridge, 1902 (type) — USA, Mexico
- M. pallidus (Banks, 1904) — USA, Mexico
- M. pearcei Chamberlin & Gertsch, 1958 — USA

=== Marilynia ===
Marilynia Lehtinen, 1967

- M. bicolor (Simon, 1870) (type) — Europe to Central Asia, North Africa
  - M. b. littoralis (Denis, 1959) — France

=== Mashimo ===
Mashimo Lehtinen, 1967

- M. leleupi Lehtinen, 1967 (type) — Zambia

=== † Mastigusa ===
† Mastigusa Menge, 1854

- † M. acuminata Menge, 1854
- † M. arcuata Wunderlich, 2004
- † M. bitterfeldensis Wunderlich, 2004
- † M. laticymbium Wunderlich, 2004
- † M. magnibulbus Wunderlich, 2004
- † M. media Wunderlich, 1986
- † M. modesta Wunderlich, 1986
- † M. scutata Wunderlich, 2004

=== Mexitlia ===
Mexitlia Lehtinen, 1967

- M. altima Bond & Opell, 1997 — Mexico
- M. grandis (O. Pickard-Cambridge, 1896) — Mexico
- M. trivittata (Banks, 1901) (type) — USA, Mexico

=== Mizaga ===
Mizaga Simon, 1898

- M. chevreuxi Simon, 1898 (type) — Senegal
- M. racovitzai (Fage, 1909) — Mediterranean

=== † Mizagalla ===
† Mizagalla Wunderlich, 2004

- † M. quattuor Wunderlich, 2004
- † M. tuberculata Wunderlich, 2004

=== Myanmardictyna ===
Myanmardictyna Wunderlich, 2017

- M. longifissum Wunderlich, 2017 (type) — Myanmar

== N ==
=== Nigma ===
Nigma

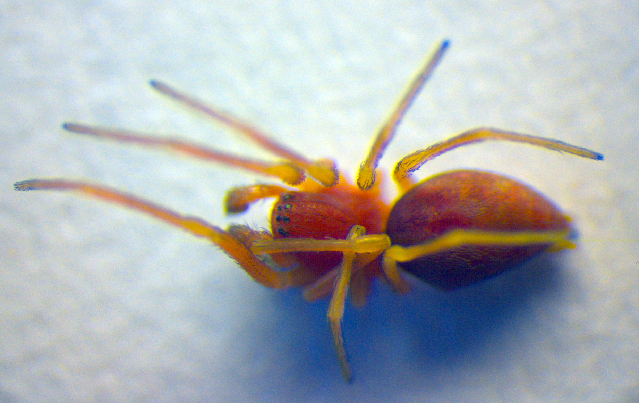
Nigma flavescens

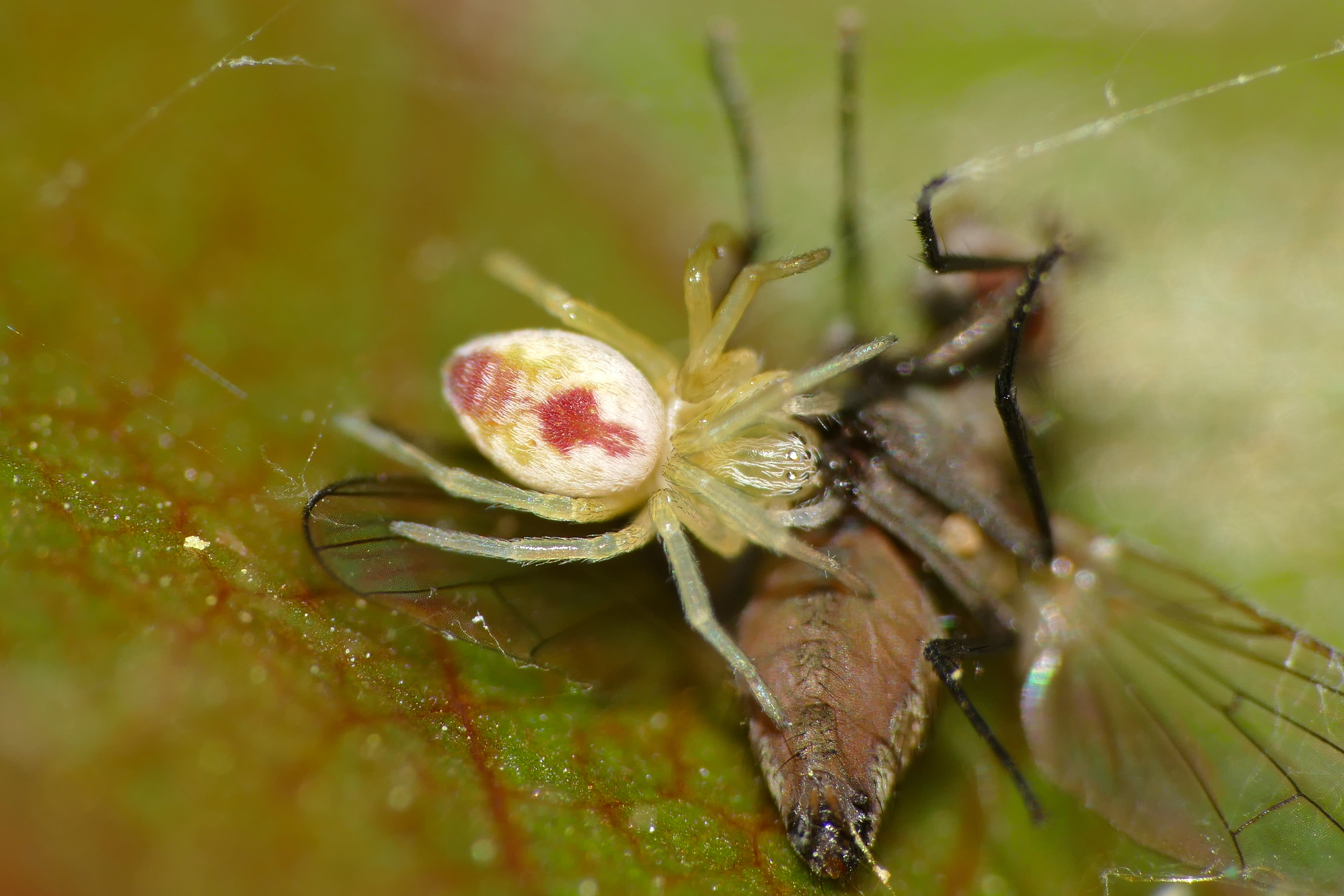
Nigma puella

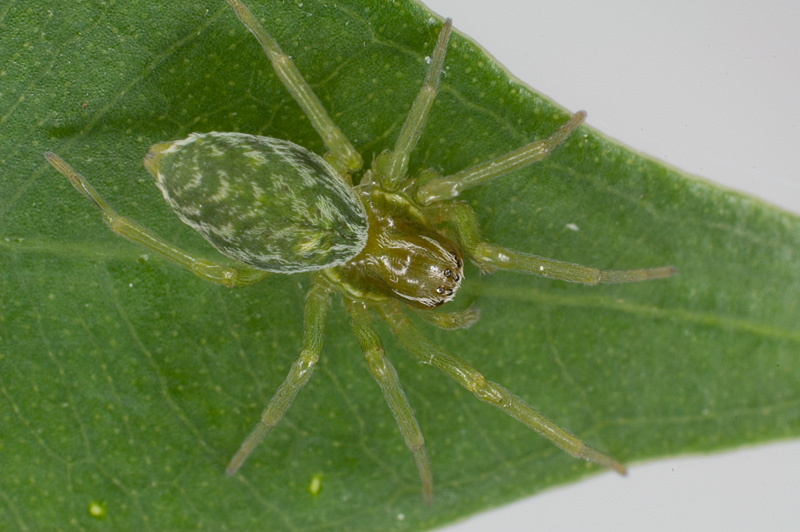
Nigma walckenaeri

Nigma Lehtinen, 1967

- N. albida (O. Pickard-Cambridge, 1885) — India, Pakistan, China (Yarkand)
- N. conducens (O. Pickard-Cambridge, 1876) — North Africa
- N. flavescens (Walckenaer, 1830) (type) — Europe, Caucasus, Iran
- N. gertschi (Berland & Millot, 1940) — Senegal
- N. hortensis (Simon, 1870) — Portugal, Spain, France, Algeria
- N. laeta (Spassky, 1952) — Azerbaijan, Iran, Tajikistan
- N. linsdalei (Chamberlin & Gertsch, 1958) — USA
- N. longipes (Berland, 1914) — East Africa
- N. nangquianensis (Hu, 2001) — China
- N. puella (Simon, 1870) — Europe, Azores, Madeira, Canary Islands
- N. shiprai (Tikader, 1966) — India
- N. tuberosa Wunderlich, 1987 — Canary Islands
- N. walckenaeri (Roewer, 1951) — Europe, Turkey, Caucasus

== P ==
=== † Palaeodictyna ===
† Palaeodictyna Wunderlich, 1988

- † P. intermedia Wunderlich, 1988
- † P. longispina Wunderlich, 1988
- † P. singularis Wunderlich, 1988
- † P. spiculum Wunderlich, 1988
- † P. termitophila Wunderlich, 1988
- † P. unispina Wunderlich, 1988

=== † Palaeolathys ===
† Palaeolathys Wunderlich, 1986

- † P. circumductus Wunderlich, 1988
- † P. copalis Wunderlich, 1986
- † P. quadruplex Wunderlich, 1988
- † P. similis Wunderlich, 1988
- † P. spinosa Wunderlich, 1986

=== Paradictyna ===
Paradictyna

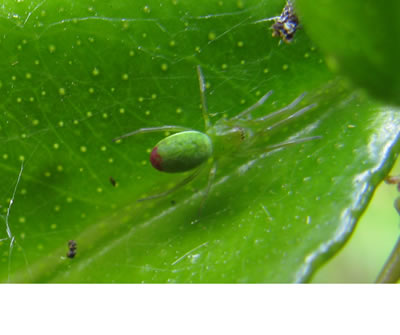
Paradictyna rufoflava

Paradictyna Forster, 1970

- P. ilamia Forster, 1970 — New Zealand
- P. rufoflava (Chamberlain, 1946) (type) — New Zealand

=== Paratheuma ===
Paratheuma Bryant, 1940

- P. andromeda Beatty & Berry, 1989 — Cook Is.
- P. armata (Marples, 1964) — Caroline Is. to Samoa
- P. australis Beatty & Berry, 1989 — Australia (Queensland), Fiji
- P. awasensis Shimojana, 2013 — Japan (Okinawa)
- P. enigmatica Zamani, Marusik & Berry, 2016 — Iran
- P. insulana (Banks, 1902) (type) — USA, Caribbean. Introduced to Japan
- P. interaesta (Roth & Brown, 1975) — Mexico
- P. makai Berry & Beatty, 1989 — Hawaii
- P. ramseyae Beatty & Berry, 1989 — Cook Is.
- P. rangiroa Beatty & Berry, 1989 — Polynesia
- P. shirahamaensis (Oi, 1960) — Korea, Japan

=== Penangodyna ===
Penangodyna Wunderlich, 1995

- P. tibialis Wunderlich, 1995 (type) — Malaysia

=== Phantyna ===
Phantyna Chamberlin, 1948

- P. bicornis (Emerton, 1915) — USA, Canada
- P. estebanensis (Simon, 1906) — Venezuela
- P. mandibularis (Taczanowski, 1874) — Mexico to Brazil
- P. meridensis (Caporiacco, 1955) — Venezuela
- P. micro (Chamberlin & Ivie, 1944) (type) — USA
- P. mulegensis (Chamberlin, 1924) — USA, Mexico
- P. pixi (Chamberlin & Gertsch, 1958) — USA
- P. provida (Gertsch & Mulaik, 1936) — USA
- P. remota (Banks, 1924) — Ecuador (Galapagos Is.)
- P. rita (Gertsch, 1946) — USA
- P. segregata (Gertsch & Mulaik, 1936) — USA, Mexico
- P. terranea (Ivie, 1947) — USA
- P. varyna (Chamberlin & Gertsch, 1958) — USA, Mexico
  - P. v. miranda (Chamberlin & Gertsch, 1958) — USA

=== † Protomastigusa ===
† Protomastigusa Wunderlich, 2004

- † P. composita Wunderlich, 2004

== Q ==
=== Qiyunia ===
Qiyunia Song & Xu, 1989

- Q. lehtineni Song & Xu, 1989 (type) — China, Japan

== R ==
=== Rhion ===
Rhion O. Pickard-Cambridge, 1871

- R. pallidum O. Pickard-Cambridge, 1871 (type) — Sri Lanka

== S ==
=== Saltonia ===
Saltonia Chamberlin & Ivie, 1942

- S. incerta (Banks, 1898) (type) — USA

=== † Scopulyna ===
† Scopulyna Wunderlich, 2004

- † S. cursor Wunderlich, 2004

=== Scotolathys ===
Scotolathys Simon, 1884

- S. simplex Simon, 1884 (type) — Algeria, Spain, North Macedonia, Greece, Ukraine, Israel

=== Shango ===
Shango Lehtinen, 1967

- S. capicola (Strand, 1909) (type) — South Africa

=== † Succinyna ===
† Succinyna Wunderlich, 1988

- † S. longembolus Wunderlich, 1988
- † S. pulcher Wunderlich, 1988
- † S. spinipalpus Wunderlich, 1988

=== Sudesna ===
Sudesna Lehtinen, 1967

- S. anaulax (Simon, 1908) — Australia (Western Australia)
- S. circularis Zhang & Li, 2011 — China
- S. digitata Zhang & Li, 2011 — China
- S. flavipes (Hu, 2001) — China
- S. grammica (Simon, 1893) — Philippines
- S. grossa (Simon, 1906) — India
- S. hedini (Schenkel, 1936) (type) — China, Korea

== T ==
=== Tahuantina ===
Tahuantina Lehtinen, 1967

- T. zapfeae Lehtinen, 1967 (type) — Chile

=== Tandil ===
Tandil Mello-Leitão, 1940

- T. nostalgicus Mello-Leitão, 1940 (type) — Argentina

=== Thallumetus ===
Thallumetus Simon, 1893

- T. acanthochirus Simon, 1904 — Chile
- T. dulcineus Gertsch, 1946 — Panama
- T. latifemur (Soares & Camargo, 1948) — Brazil
- T. octomaculellus (Gertsch & Davis, 1937) — Mexico
- T. parvulus Bryant, 1942 — Virgin Is.
- T. pineus (Chamberlin & Ivie, 1944) — USA
- T. pullus Chickering, 1952 — Panama
- T. pusillus Chickering, 1950 — Panama
- T. salax Simon, 1893 (type) — Venezuela
- T. simoni Gertsch, 1945 — Guyana
- † T. copalis Wunderlich, 2004

=== Tivyna ===
Tivyna Chamberlin, 1948

- T. moaba (Ivie, 1947) — USA
- T. pallida (Keyserling, 1887) (type) — USA
- T. petrunkevitchi (Gertsch & Mulaik, 1940) — USA
- T. spatula (Gertsch & Davis, 1937) — USA, Mexico, Cuba, Bahama Is.

=== Tricholathys ===
Tricholathys Chamberlin & Ivie, 1935

- T. alxa (Tang, 2011) — China
- T. burangensis Wang, Peng & Zhang, 2023 — China
- T. cascadea Chamberlin & Gertsch, 1958 — USA
- T. chenzhenningi Wang, Peng & Zhang, 2023 — China
- T. hansi (Schenkel, 1950) — USA
- T. hebeiensis Wang, Peng & Zhang, 2023 — China
- T. hirsutipes (Banks, 1921) — USA
- T. jacinto Chamberlin & Gertsch, 1958 — USA
- T. knulli Gertsch & Mulaik, 1936 — USA
- T. lhunzeensis Wang, Peng & Zhang, 2023 — China
- T. monterea Chamberlin & Gertsch, 1958 — USA
- T. ovtchinnikovi Marusik, Omelko & Ponomarev, 2017 — Russia (Caucasus)
- T. relicta Ovtchinnikov, 2001 — Kyrgyzstan
- T. relictoides Wang, Peng & Zhang, 2023 — China
- T. rothi Chamberlin & Gertsch, 1958 — Canada, USA
- T. saltona Chamberlin, 1948 — USA
- T. serrata Wang, Peng & Zhang, 2023 — China
- T. spiralis Chamberlin & Ivie, 1935 (type) — Canada, USA
- T. subnivalis (Ovtchinnikov, 1989) — Kyrgyzstan, Tajikistan
- T. xizangensis Wang, Peng & Zhang, 2023 — China

== V ==
=== † Vectaraneus ===
† Vectaraneus Selden, 2001

- † V. yulei Selden, 2001

=== Viridictyna ===
Viridictyna Forster, 1970

- V. australis Forster, 1970 — New Zealand
- V. kikkawai Forster, 1970 (type) — New Zealand
- V. nelsonensis Forster, 1970 — New Zealand
- V. parva Forster, 1970 — New Zealand
- V. picata Forster, 1970 — New Zealand
