= C. maritimus =

C. maritimus may refer to:

- Cathormiocerus maritimus, a weevil species in the genus Cathormiocerus
- Ceanothus maritimus, a buckthorn species
- Chaerea maritimus, a spider species in the genus Chaerea
- Cordylanthus maritimus, a broomrape species
- Croton maritimus, a rushfoil species in the genus Croton
- Cryptanthus maritimus, a bromeliad species

== See also ==
- Maritimus (disambiguation)
