= Saltonia =

Scientific classification
- Kingdom: Animalia
- Phylum: Arthropoda
- Subphylum: Chelicerata
- Class: Arachnida
- Order: Araneae
- Infraorder: Araneomorphae
- Family: Argyronetidae
- Genus: Saltonia; Chamberlin & Ivie, 1942
- Species: S. incerta

Binomial name
- Saltonia incerta (Banks, 1898)

Genus of spiders

Saltonia is a monotypic genus of North American cribellate araneomorph spiders in the family Argyronetidae containing the single species, Saltonia incerta. It was first described by R. V. Chamberlin & Wilton Ivie in 1942, and has only been found in United States. Originally placed with the funnel weavers, it was moved to the Dictynidae in 1967, and to Argyronetidae in 2025.

It is a rare spider only known from the shores of the Salton Sea in California, United States. S. incerta has been found among salt-crusts in several dry or intermittent lake-beds, and from a small island in the Gulf of California. All specimens were collected during March and April near salt springs, salt water, or salt marshes.

Its colulus is similar to that of two genera of intertidal zone spiders of the family Desidae, Paratheuma and Desis. Genetic evidence suggests it is closely related to Paratheuma and the fully aquatic species Argyroneta aquatica.
