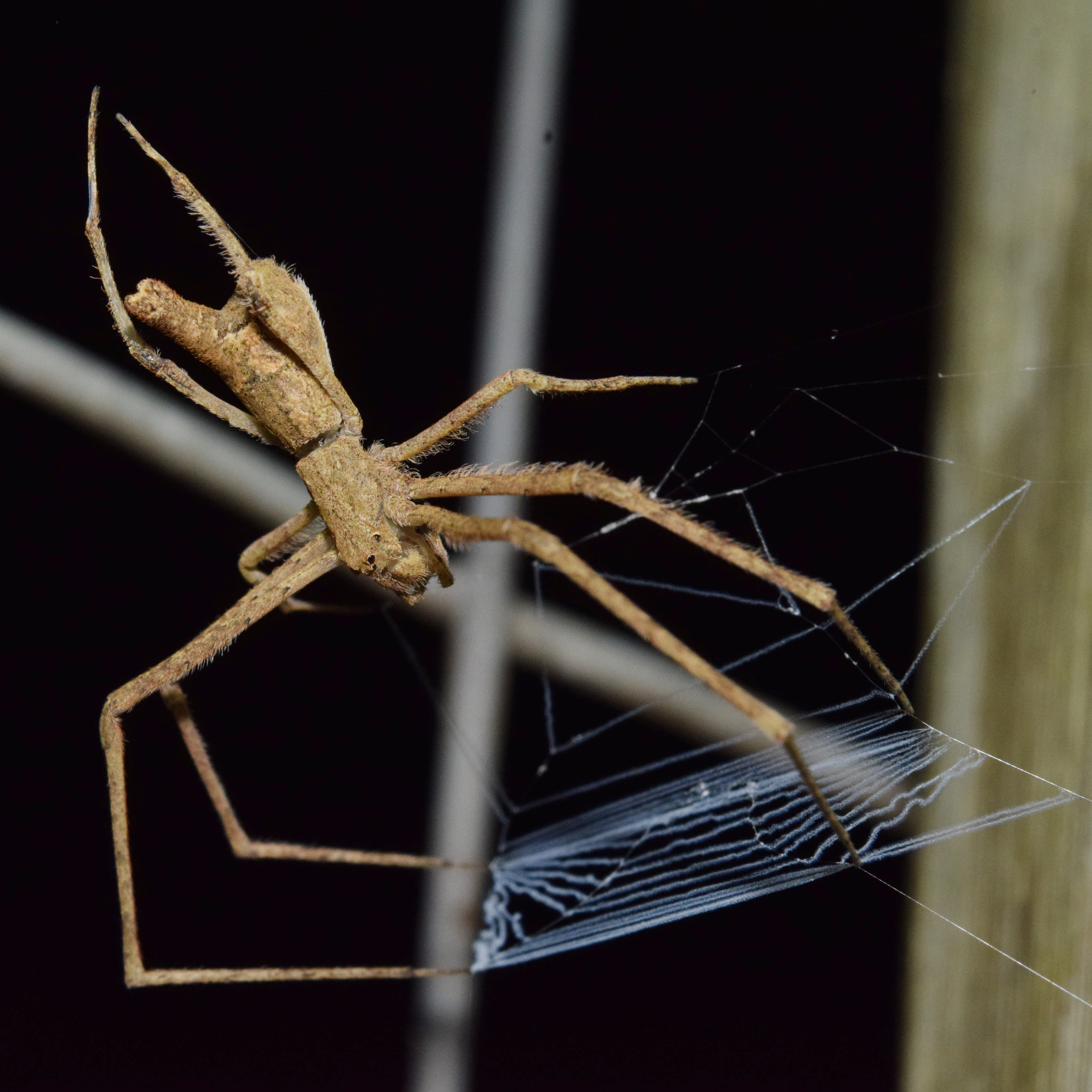
- M. camelus from Durban
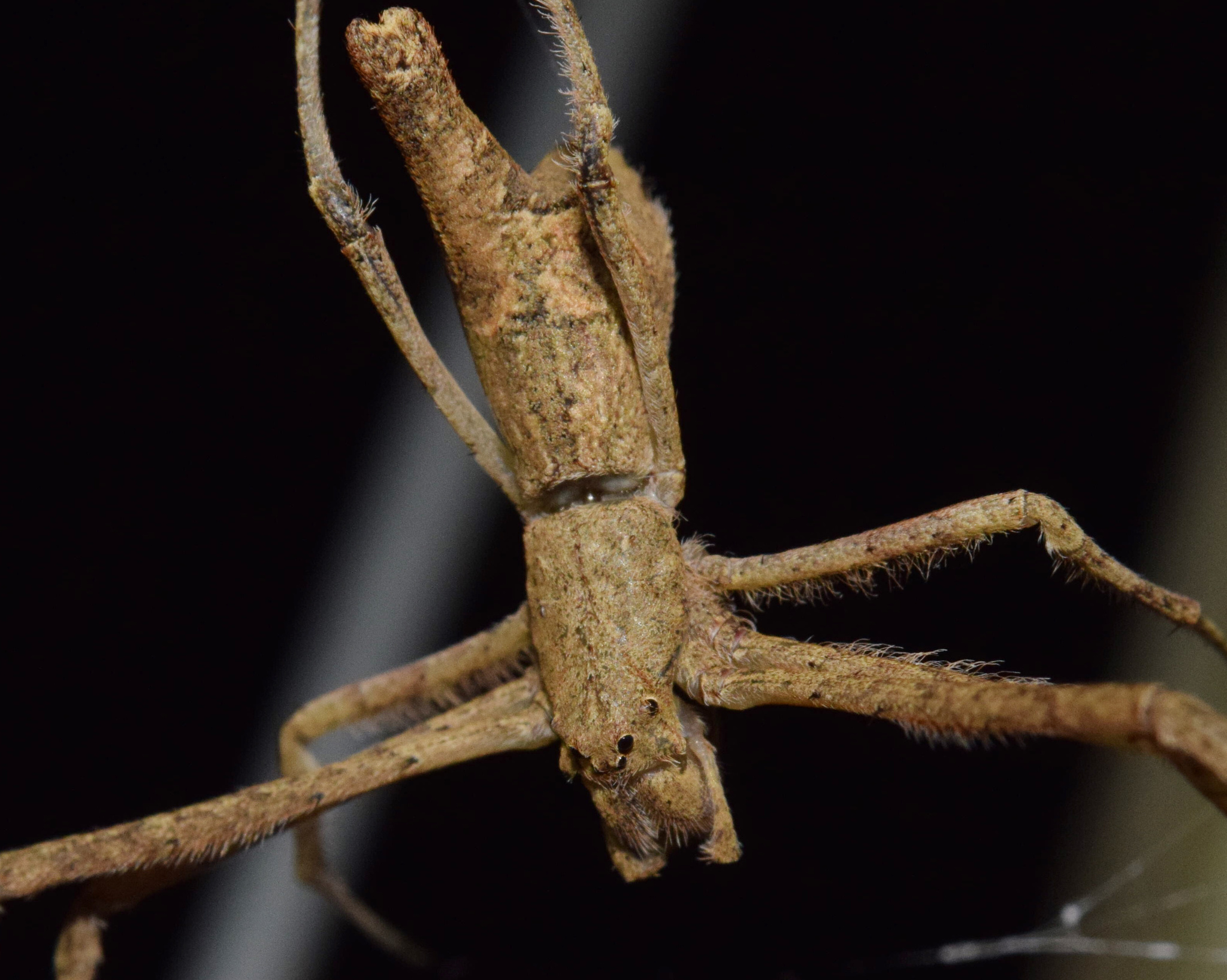

Conservation status
- Least Concern (IUCN 3.1)

Scientific classification
- Kingdom: Animalia
- Phylum: Arthropoda
- Subphylum: Chelicerata
- Class: Arachnida
- Order: Araneae
- Infraorder: Araneomorphae
- Family: Deinopidae
- Genus: Menneus
- Species: M. camelus

Binomial name
- Menneus camelus Pocock, 1902

= Menneus camelus =

Camel Back Net Casting Spider

Species of spider endemic to South Africa

Menneus camelus, also known as the camel-back net-casting spider, is a species of net-casting spider in the family Deinopidae. It is endemic to eastern South Africa.

== Etymology ==
The species epithet "camelus" refers to the camel-like humps on the female's abdomen, which give the spider its distinctive profile.

== Distribution ==
Menneus camelus was originally described from Durban, South Africa. It is a South African endemic known from eight provinces and occurs in more than ten protected areas at altitudes ranging from 4 to 1,762 metres above sea level.

== Habitat and ecology ==
The species constructs small, rectangular expandable webs made with cribellate silk held in their front legs. It has been sampled from the Fynbos, Grassland, Indian Ocean Coastal Belt, Savanna, and Thicket biomes. Menneus camelus is also synanthropic and frequently found in and around houses in South Africa. It has been recorded from avocado orchards.

== Description ==
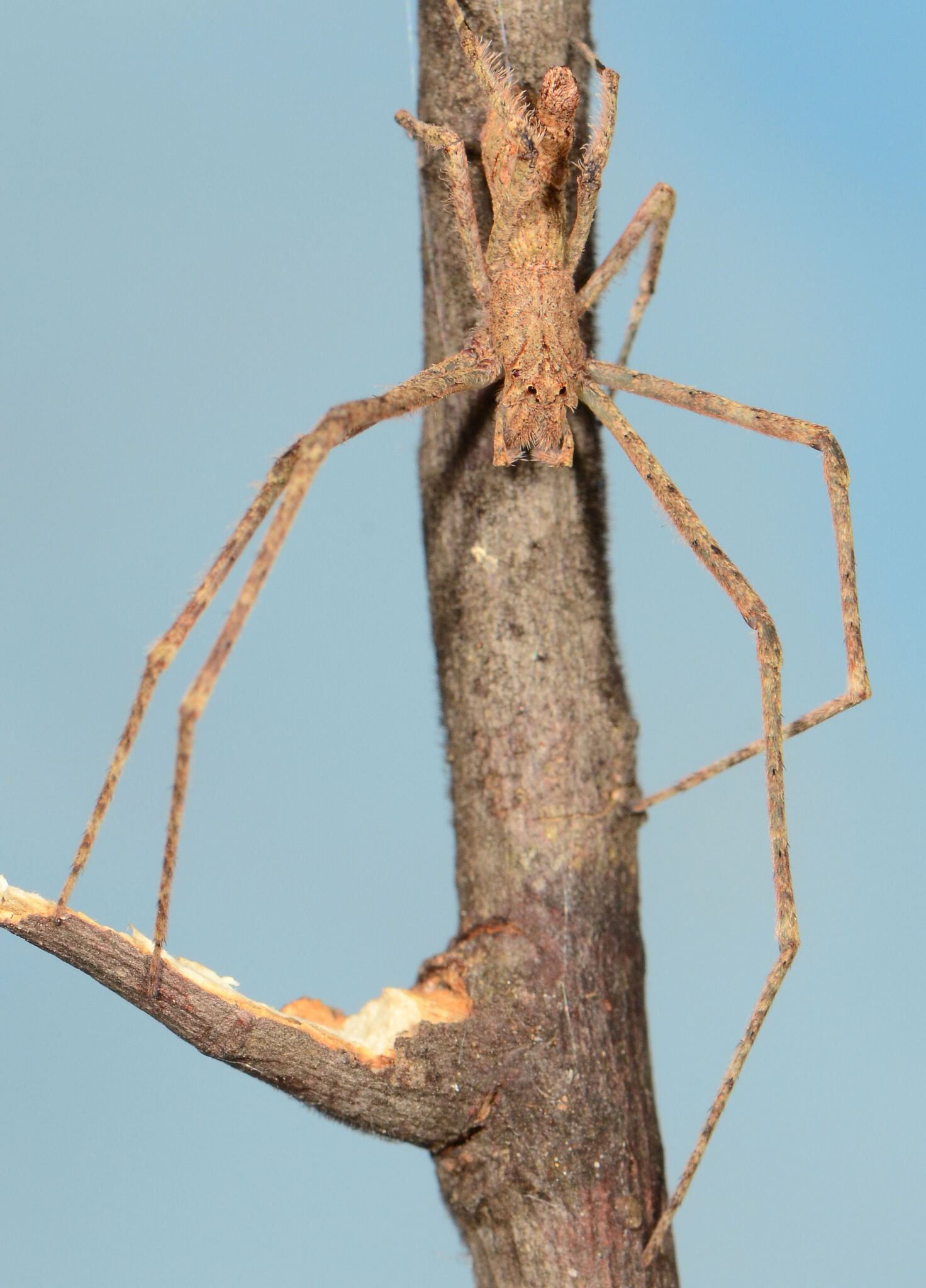
female

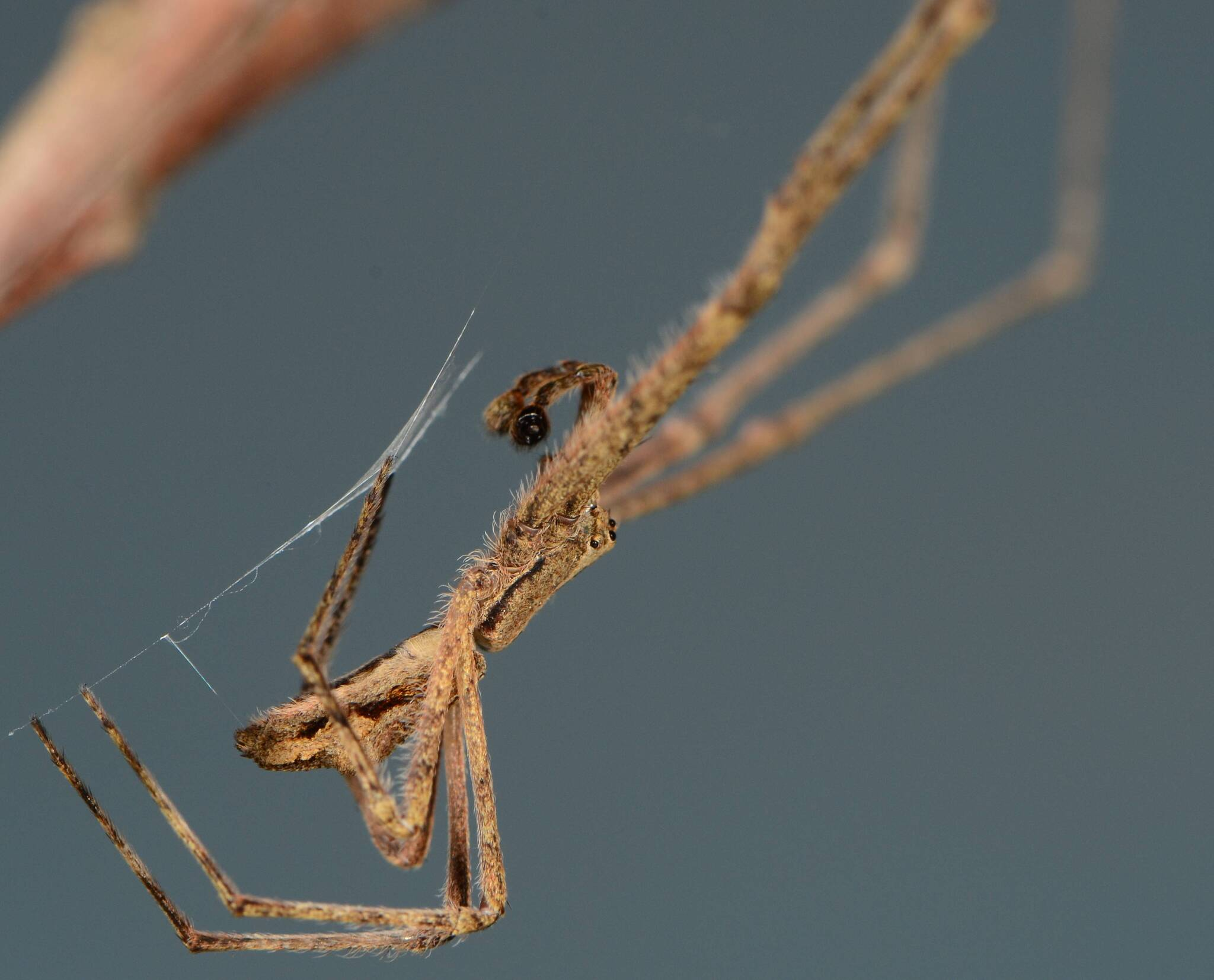
male

== Conservation ==
Menneus camelus is listed as Least Concern by the South African National Biodiversity Institute due to its wide geographical distribution and occurrence in numerous protected areas. There are no significant threats to the species.

== Taxonomy ==
The species was originally described by Reginald Innes Pocock in 1902 from Durban. The genus Menneus was revised by Coddington et al. in 2012.
