= Scotolathys simplex =

Scientific classification
- Kingdom: Animalia
- Phylum: Arthropoda
- Subphylum: Chelicerata
- Class: Arachnida
- Order: Araneae
- Infraorder: Araneomorphae
- Family: Dictynidae
- Genus: Scotolathys
- Species: S. simplex

Binomial name
- Scotolathys simplex Simon, 1884

Genus of spiders

Scotolathys simplex is a species of cribellate araneomorph spider in the family Dictynidae. It was first described by Eugène Simon in 1884, and is found in Europe, North Africa and the Levant.
