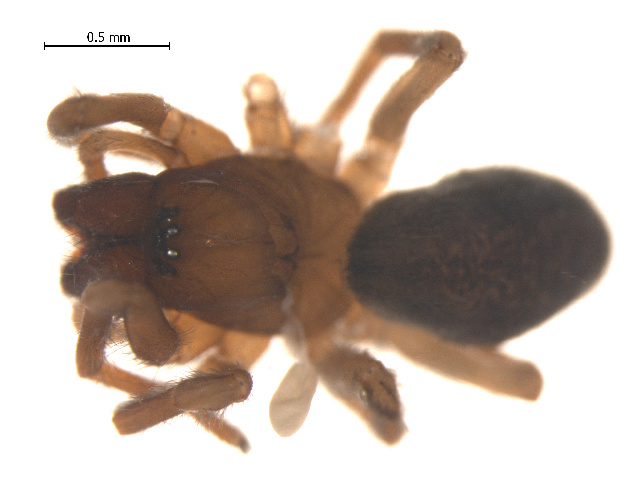
- A. lapponica

Scientific classification
- Kingdom: Animalia
- Phylum: Arthropoda
- Subphylum: Chelicerata
- Class: Arachnida
- Order: Araneae
- Infraorder: Araneomorphae
- Family: Dictynidae
- Genus: Arctella; Holm, 1945
- Species: A. lapponica

Binomial name
- Arctella lapponica Holm, 1945

= Arctella =

Genus of spiders

Arctella is a monotypic genus of cribellate araneomorph spiders in the family Argyronetidae containing the single species, Arctella lapponica. It was first described by species:Åke Holm in 1945, and has been found in Russia, Scandinavia, Mongolia, the United States, and Canada.
