= Altella =

Scientific classification
- Kingdom: Animalia
- Phylum: Arthropoda
- Subphylum: Chelicerata
- Class: Arachnida
- Order: Araneae
- Infraorder: Araneomorphae
- Family: Argyronetidae
- Genus: Altella; Simon, 1884

Type species
- A. lucida (Simon, 1874)

Species
- 11, see text

Synonyms
- Altellela Miller, 1949

Genus of spiders

Altella is a genus of cribellate araneomorph spiders in the family Argyronetidae. It was first described by Eugène Simon in 1884.

== Species ==
As of October 2025, this genus includes eleven species:

- Altella aussereri Thaler, 1990 – Italy, Slovakia
- Altella biuncata (Miller, 1949) – Central Europe, Italy, Romania
- Altella caspia Ponomarev, 2008 – Kazakhstan
- Altella conglobata Dyal, 1935 – Pakistan
- Altella hungarica Loksa, 1981 – France, Germany, Hungary, Ukraine, Russia (Europe, Caucasus)
- Altella lucida (Simon, 1874) – Europe, Turkey (type species)
- Altella media Wunderlich, 1992 – Canary Islands
- Altella opaca Simon, 1911 – Algeria
- Altella orientalis Balogh, 1935 – Hungary
- Altella pygmaea Wunderlich, 1992 – Canary Islands
- Altella uncata Simon, 1885 – Algeria
