= Banaidja =

Scientific classification
- Domain: Eukaryota
- Kingdom: Animalia
- Phylum: Arthropoda
- Subphylum: Chelicerata
- Class: Arachnida
- Order: Araneae
- Infraorder: Araneomorphae
- Family: Dictynidae
- Genus: Banaidja; Lehtinen, 1967
- Species: B. bifasciata

Binomial name
- Banaidja bifasciata (L. Koch, 1872)

Genus of spiders

Banaidja is a monotypic genus of South Pacific cribellate araneomorph spiders in the family Dictynidae containing the single species, Banaidja bifasciata. It was first described by Pekka T. Lehtinen in 1967, and has only been found in Samoa. The type species was transferred from Dictyna in 1929, retaining the original species name.
