= Penangodyna =

Scientific classification
- Domain: Eukaryota
- Kingdom: Animalia
- Phylum: Arthropoda
- Subphylum: Chelicerata
- Class: Arachnida
- Order: Araneae
- Infraorder: Araneomorphae
- Family: Dictynidae
- Genus: Penangodyna; Wunderlich, 1995
- Species: P. tibialis

Binomial name
- Penangodyna tibialis Wunderlich, 1995

Genus of spiders

Penangodyna is a monotypic genus of Southeast Asian cribellate araneomorph spiders in the family Dictynidae containing the single species, Penangodyna tibialis. It was first described by J. Wunderlich in 1995, and has only been found in Malaysia.
