= Atelolathys =

Scientific classification
- Kingdom: Animalia
- Phylum: Arthropoda
- Subphylum: Chelicerata
- Class: Arachnida
- Order: Araneae
- Infraorder: Araneomorphae
- Family: Dictynidae
- Genus: Atelolathys; Simon, 1892
- Species: A. varia

Binomial name
- Atelolathys varia Simon, 1892

Genus of spiders

Atelolathys is a monotypic genus of Asian cribellate araneomorph spiders in the family Dictynidae containing the single species, Atelolathys varia. It was first described by Eugène Simon in 1892, and has only been found in Sri Lanka.
