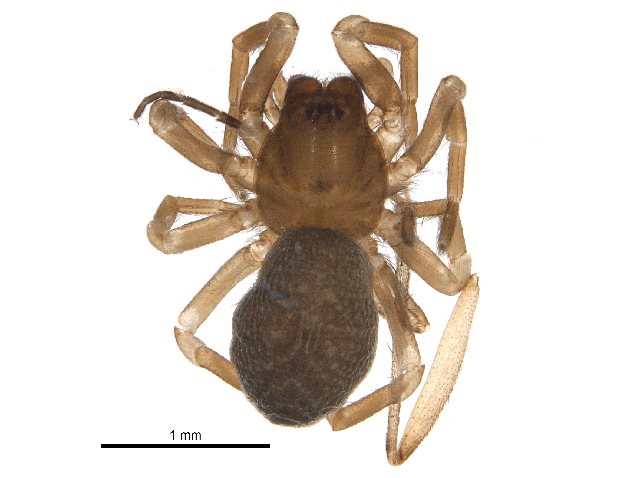
- H. prominula
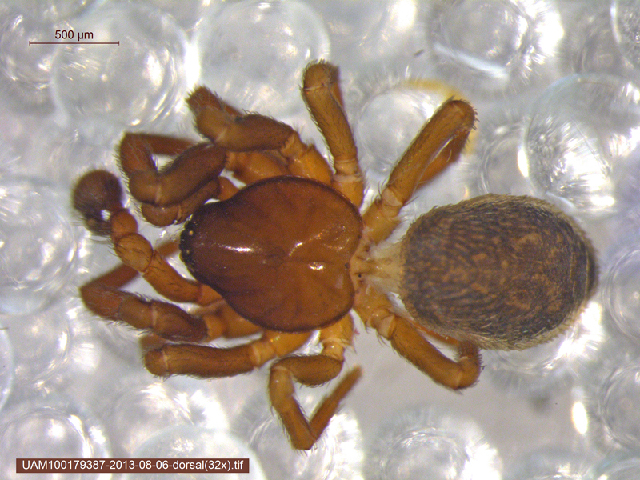
- H. saphes, adult male

Scientific classification
- Kingdom: Animalia
- Phylum: Arthropoda
- Subphylum: Chelicerata
- Class: Arachnida
- Order: Araneae
- Infraorder: Araneomorphae
- Family: Dictynidae
- Genus: Hackmania; Lehtinen, 1967

Type species
- H. prominula (Tullgren, 1948)

Species
- H. prominula (Tullgren, 1948); H. saphes (Chamberlin, 1948)

= Hackmania =

Genus of spiders

Hackmania is a genus of cribellate araneomorph spiders in the family Dictynidae, and was first described by Pekka T. Lehtinen in 1967.

== Species ==
As of October 2025, this genus includes two species:

- Hackmania prominula (Tullgren, 1948) – North America, Northern Europe, Russia (Europe to Far East) (type species)
- Hackmania saphes (Chamberlin, 1948) – United States
