= Arangina =

Scientific classification
- Kingdom: Animalia
- Phylum: Arthropoda
- Subphylum: Chelicerata
- Class: Arachnida
- Order: Araneae
- Infraorder: Araneomorphae
- Family: Dictynidae
- Genus: Arangina; Lehtinen, 1967

Type species
- A. cornigera (Dalmas, 1917)

Species
- A. cornigera (Dalmas, 1917) – New Zealand; A. pluva Forster, 1970 – New Zealand

Genus of spiders

Arangina is a genus of South Pacific cribellate araneomorph spiders in the family Dictynidae, and was first described by Pekka T. Lehtinen in 1967. As of May 2019 it contains only two species, both found in New Zealand: A. cornigera and A. pluva.
