= Tahuantina =

Scientific classification
- Kingdom: Animalia
- Phylum: Arthropoda
- Subphylum: Chelicerata
- Class: Arachnida
- Order: Araneae
- Infraorder: Araneomorphae
- Family: Dictynidae
- Genus: Tahuantina; Lehtinen, 1967
- Species: T. zapfeae

Binomial name
- Tahuantina zapfeae Lehtinen, 1967

Genus of spiders

Tahuantina is a monotypic genus of South American cribellate araneomorph spiders in the family Dictynidae containing the single species, Tahuantina zapfeae. It was first described by Pekka T. Lehtinen in 1967, and has only been found in Chile.
