= Tandil nostalgicus =

Scientific classification
- Kingdom: Animalia
- Phylum: Arthropoda
- Subphylum: Chelicerata
- Class: Arachnida
- Order: Araneae
- Infraorder: Araneomorphae
- Family: Dictynidae
- Genus: Tandil; Mello-Leitão, 1940
- Species: T. nostalgicus

Binomial name
- Tandil nostalgicus Mello-Leitão, 1940

Genus of spiders

Tandil is a monotypic genus of South American cribellate araneomorph spiders in the family Dictynidae containing the single species, Tandil nostalgicus. It was first described by Cândido Firmino de Mello-Leitão in 1940, and has only been found in Argentina.
