= Adenodictyna =

Scientific classification
- Domain: Eukaryota
- Kingdom: Animalia
- Phylum: Arthropoda
- Subphylum: Chelicerata
- Class: Arachnida
- Order: Araneae
- Infraorder: Araneomorphae
- Family: Dictynidae
- Genus: Adenodictyna; Ono, 2008
- Species: A. kudoae

Binomial name
- Adenodictyna kudoae Ono, 2008

Genus of spiders

Adenodictyna is a monotypic genus of Asian cribellate araneomorph spiders in the family Dictynidae containing the single species, Adenodictyna kudoae. It was first described by H. Ono in 2008, and has only been found in Japan.
