= Hoplolathys =

Scientific classification
- Domain: Eukaryota
- Kingdom: Animalia
- Phylum: Arthropoda
- Subphylum: Chelicerata
- Class: Arachnida
- Order: Araneae
- Infraorder: Araneomorphae
- Family: Dictynidae
- Genus: Hoplolathys; Caporiacco, 1947
- Species: H. aethiopica

Binomial name
- Hoplolathys aethiopica Caporiacco, 1947

Genus of spiders

Hoplolathys is a monotypic genus of East African cribellate araneomorph spiders in the family Dictynidae containing the single species, Hoplolathys aethiopica. It was first described by Lodovico di Caporiacco in 1947, and has only been found in Ethiopia.
