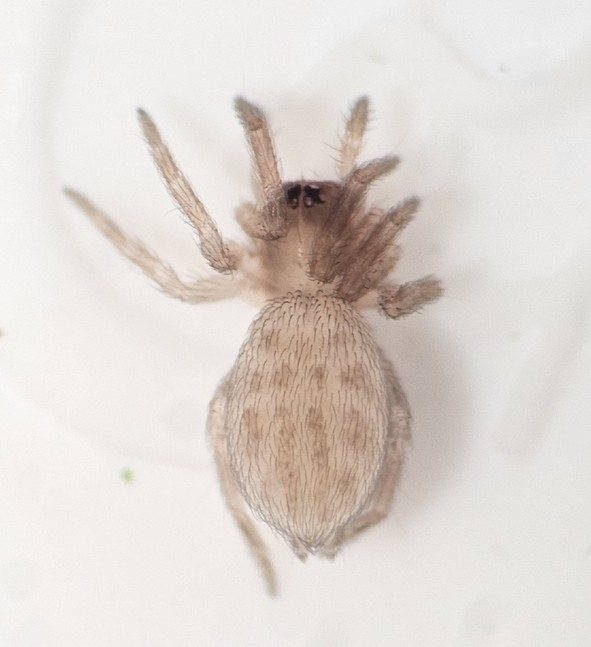
- Scotolathys immaculata

Scientific classification
- Kingdom: Animalia
- Phylum: Arthropoda
- Subphylum: Chelicerata
- Class: Arachnida
- Order: Araneae
- Infraorder: Araneomorphae
- Family: Dictynidae
- Genus: Scotolathys; Simon, 1884

= Scotolathys =

Genus of spiders

Scotolathys is a genus of cribellate araneomorph spiders in the family Dictynidae. It was erected by Eugène Simon in 1884, and separated from Lathys into its own genus in 2009. Species occur in North America, Europe, North Africa and the Levant.

== Species ==
The following species are recognised in the genus Scotolathys:

- Scotolathys delicatula Gertsch & Mulaik, 1936 - US
- Scotolathys immaculata Chamberlin & Ivie, 1944 - US
- Scotolathys maculina (Gertsch, 1946) - US
- Scotolathys pallida (Marx, 1891) - Canada, US
- Scotolathys simplex Simon, 1885 - Portugal, Spain, France, Ukraine, Romania, North Macedonia, Bulgaria, Greece, Algeria, Israel
