= Shango capicola =

Scientific classification
- Kingdom: Animalia
- Phylum: Arthropoda
- Subphylum: Chelicerata
- Class: Arachnida
- Order: Araneae
- Infraorder: Araneomorphae
- Family: Dictynidae
- Genus: Shango; Lehtinen, 1967
- Species: S. capicola

Binomial name
- Shango capicola (Strand, 1909)

Species of spider

Shango capicola is a species of cribellate spider in the family Dictynidae. It is the only species in the monotypic genus Shango. It is only known from South Africa.

== Distribution ==
Shango capicola is endemic to the Western Cape of South Africa. It is known from Simon's Town and Kirstenbosch National Botanical Garden. The species occurs at altitudes around 1 m above sea level.

== Description ==
Shango capicola is known only from females, though an undescribed male has possibly been collected. Females measure 2 mm in total size while the possible male measures 1.8 mm. The carapace is light brownish yellow with diagnostic brown hairs arranged in longitudinal rows from the cephalic region to the lateral edge.

The eyes are arranged in two rows and the ventral surface is pale. The opisthosoma is long and oval, light grey with chalk bodies and faint chevron markings. The cribellum is entire, and the anterior and posterior spinnerets are short and conical.

== Conservation ==
Shango capicola is listed as Data Deficient for taxonomic reasons. Too little is known about the location, habitat and threats of this taxon for a proper assessment to be made. More sampling is needed to collect males and determine the species' range.

== Taxonomy ==
The species was originally described as Dictyna capicola by Embrik Strand in 1909 from Simon's Town. The placement of the species remains problematic and requires further taxonomic revision.
