= Paratheuma draneyi =

Scientific classification
- Kingdom: Animalia
- Phylum: Arthropoda
- Subphylum: Chelicerata
- Class: Arachnida
- Order: Araneae
- Infraorder: Araneomorphae
- Family: Argyronetidae
- Genus: Paratheuma
- Species: P. draneyi

Binomial name
- Paratheuma draneyi Berry, 2024

Species of spider

Paratheuma draneyi is a species of Dictynidae spider that is endemic to New Zealand.

== Taxonomy ==
This species was described in 2024 by James William Berry from female and male specimens collected in Northland. The holotype is stored in the New Zealand Arthropod Collection.

== Description ==
The female is recorded at 3.37–4.07mm in length whereas the male is 3.03mm. This species has a light yellow carapace, tan coloured legs and grey abdomen with pale chevron markings dorsally.

== Distribution ==
This species is only known from Northland, New Zealand. It is restricted to beaches in the upper tide zone where there is a sandy base and rock rubble.
