= Tivyna =

Scientific classification
- Kingdom: Animalia
- Phylum: Arthropoda
- Subphylum: Chelicerata
- Class: Arachnida
- Order: Araneae
- Infraorder: Araneomorphae
- Family: Dictynidae
- Genus: Tivyna; Chamberlin, 1948

Type species
- T. pallida (Keyserling, 1887)

Species
- 4, see text

Genus of spiders

Tivyna is a genus of cribellate araneomorph spiders in the family Dictynidae, and was first described by R. V. Chamberlin in 1948.

== Species ==
As of May 2019 it contains four species:

- Tivyna moaba (Ivie, 1947) – USA
- Tivyna pallida (Keyserling, 1887) (type) – USA
- Tivyna petrunkevitchi (Gertsch & Mulaik, 1940) – USA
- Tivyna spatula (Gertsch & Davis, 1937) – USA, Mexico, Cuba, Bahama Is.
