= Aebutina =

Scientific classification
- Kingdom: Animalia
- Phylum: Arthropoda
- Subphylum: Chelicerata
- Class: Arachnida
- Order: Araneae
- Infraorder: Araneomorphae
- Family: Dictynidae
- Genus: Aebutina; Simon, 1892
- Species: A. binotata

Binomial name
- Aebutina binotata Simon, 1892

Genus of spiders

Aebutina is a monotypic genus of South American cribellate araneomorph spiders in the family Dictynidae containing the single species, Aebutina binotata. It was first described by Eugène Simon in 1892, and has only been found in Ecuador and in Brazil.
