= Qiyunia =

Scientific classification
- Domain: Eukaryota
- Kingdom: Animalia
- Phylum: Arthropoda
- Subphylum: Chelicerata
- Class: Arachnida
- Order: Araneae
- Infraorder: Araneomorphae
- Family: Dictynidae
- Genus: Qiyunia; Song & Xu, 1989
- Species: Q. lehtineni

Binomial name
- Qiyunia lehtineni Song & Xu, 1989

Genus of spiders

Qiyunia is a monotypic genus of Asian cribellate araneomorph spiders in the family Dictynidae containing the single species, Qiyunia lehtineni. It was first described by D. X. Song & Y. J. Xu in 1989, and has only been found in China and in Japan.
