= Argennina =

Scientific classification
- Domain: Eukaryota
- Kingdom: Animalia
- Phylum: Arthropoda
- Subphylum: Chelicerata
- Class: Arachnida
- Order: Araneae
- Infraorder: Araneomorphae
- Family: Dictynidae
- Genus: Argennina; Gertsch & Mulaik, 1936
- Species: A. unica

Binomial name
- Argennina unica Gertsch & Mulaik, 1936

Genus of spiders

Argennina is a monotypic genus of North American cribellate araneomorph spiders in the family Dictynidae containing the single species, Argennina unica. It was first described by Willis J. Gertsch & S. Mulaik in 1936, and has only been found in Texas. Individuals are around 5 mm (0.20 in) in body length. The carapace is a pale yellow brown, sparsely covered with short black hairs, and the abdomen is gray to pale yellow with fine pale hairs.
