= Bannaella =

Scientific classification
- Kingdom: Animalia
- Phylum: Arthropoda
- Subphylum: Chelicerata
- Class: Arachnida
- Order: Araneae
- Infraorder: Araneomorphae
- Family: Dictynidae
- Genus: Bannaella; Zhang & Li, 2011

Type species
- B. tibialis Zhang & Li, 2011

Species
- B. lhasana (Hu, 2001) – China; B. sinuata Zhang & Li, 2011 – China; B. tibialis Zhang & Li, 2011 – China

Genus of spiders

Bannaella is a genus of East Asian cribellate araneomorph spiders in the family Dictynidae, and was first described by Z. S. Zhang & S. Q. Li in 2011. As of May 2019 it contains only three species, all found in China: B. lhasana, B. sinuata, and B. tibialis.
