= Rhion pallidum =

Scientific classification
- Kingdom: Animalia
- Phylum: Arthropoda
- Subphylum: Chelicerata
- Class: Arachnida
- Order: Araneae
- Infraorder: Araneomorphae
- Family: Dictynidae
- Genus: Rhion; O. Pickard-Cambridge, 1871
- Species: R. pallidum

Binomial name
- Rhion pallidum O. Pickard-Cambridge, 1871

Genus of spiders

Rhion is a monotypic genus of Asian cribellate araneomorph spiders in the family Dictynidae containing the single species, Rhion pallidum. It was first described by O. Pickard-Cambridge in 1871, and has only been found in Sri Lanka.
