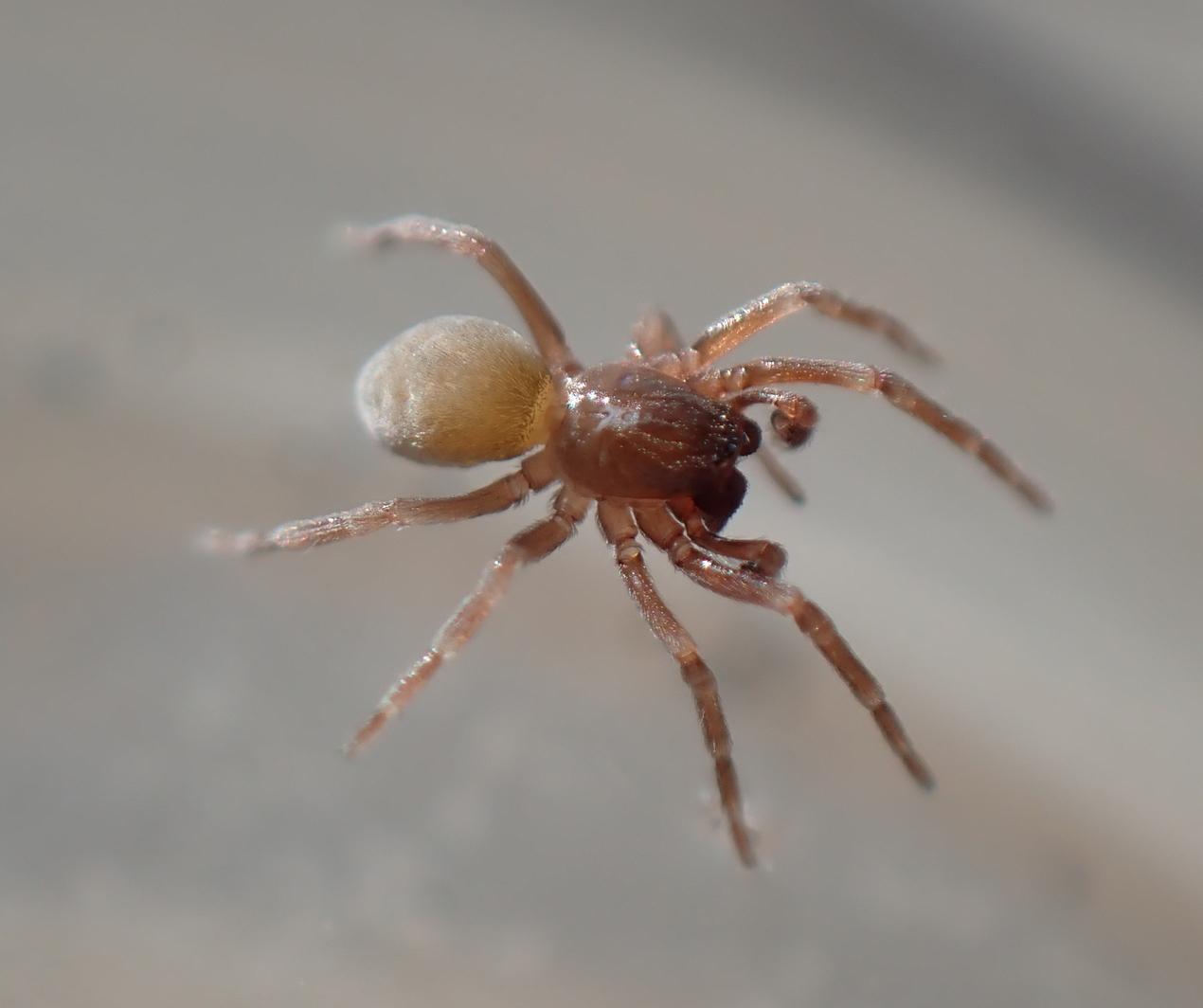
- C. maritimus in France

Scientific classification
- Kingdom: Animalia
- Phylum: Arthropoda
- Subphylum: Chelicerata
- Class: Arachnida
- Order: Araneae
- Infraorder: Araneomorphae
- Family: Dictynidae
- Genus: Chaerea; Simon, 1885
- Species: C. maritimus

Binomial name
- Chaerea maritimus Simon, 1885

= Chaerea =

Genus of spiders

Chaerea is a monotypic genus of cribellate araneomorph spiders in the family Argyronetidae containing the single species, Chaerea maritimus. It was first described by Eugène Simon in 1885 and has been found in Algeria, Spain, France, Italy, and Greece.
