= Altella orientalis =

Scientific classification
- Kingdom: Animalia
- Phylum: Arthropoda
- Subphylum: Chelicerata
- Class: Arachnida
- Order: Araneae
- Infraorder: Araneomorphae
- Family: Argyronetidae
- Genus: Altella
- Species: A. orientalis

Binomial name
- Altella orientalis Balogh, 1935

Species of spider

Altella orientalis is a spider species found in Hungary.
