= Altella lucida =

Scientific classification
- Kingdom: Animalia
- Phylum: Arthropoda
- Subphylum: Chelicerata
- Class: Arachnida
- Order: Araneae
- Infraorder: Araneomorphae
- Family: Argyronetidae
- Genus: Altella
- Species: A. lucida

Binomial name
- Altella lucida (Simon, 1874)

Species of spider

Altella lucida is a spider species found in Europe and Turkey.
