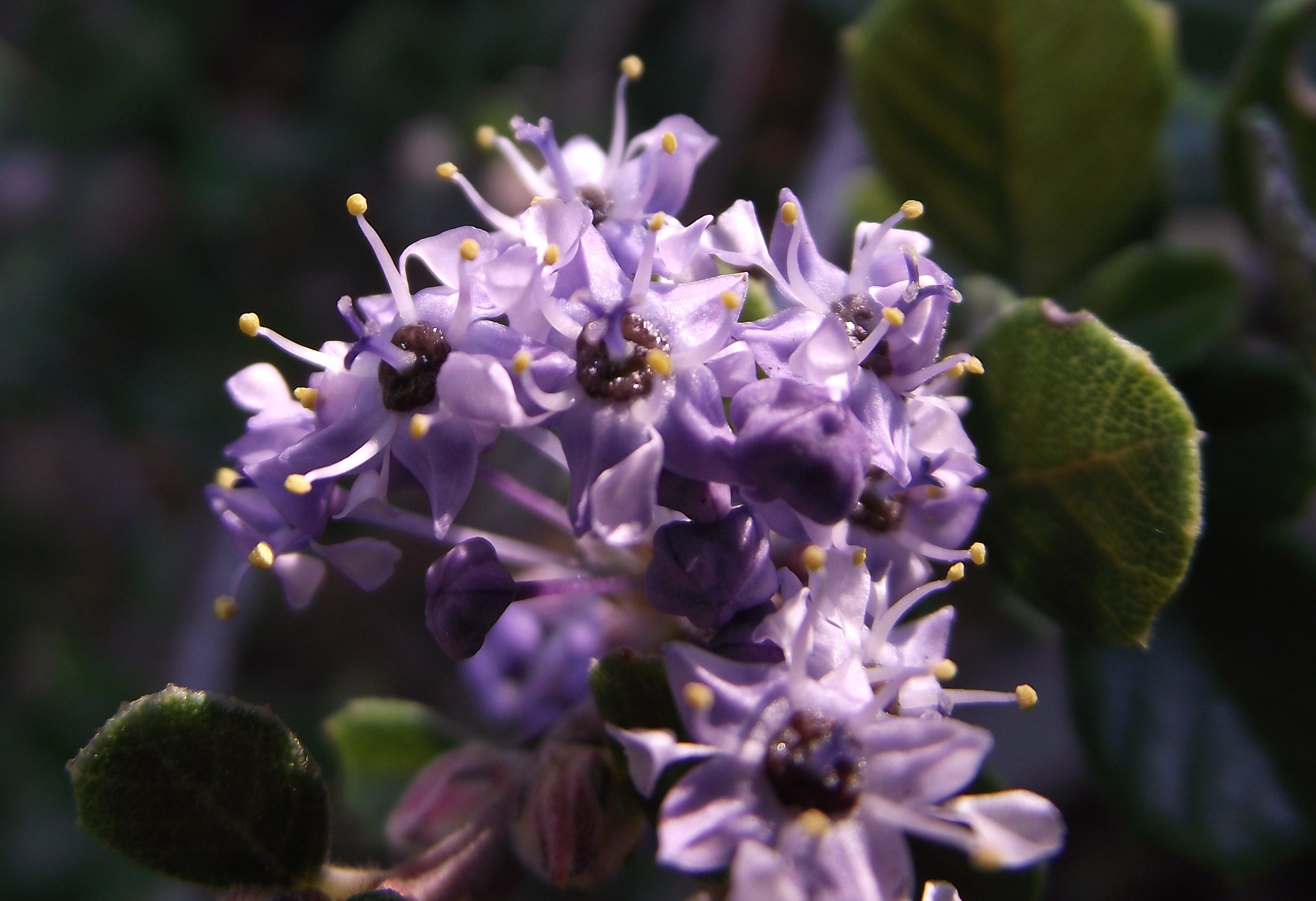

Conservation status
- Imperiled (NatureServe)

Scientific classification
- Kingdom: Plantae
- Clade: Tracheophytes
- Clade: Angiosperms
- Clade: Eudicots
- Clade: Rosids
- Order: Rosales
- Family: Rhamnaceae
- Genus: Ceanothus
- Species: C. maritimus

Binomial name
- Ceanothus maritimus Hoover

= Ceanothus maritimus =

Species of flowering plant

Ceanothus maritimus, with the common name maritime ceanothus, is a species of shrub in the buckthorn family Rhamnaceae. It is endemic to San Luis Obispo County, California, where it is known from only a few occurrences in the vicinity of Hearst Ranch. It shares the same range as the similarly rare Ceanothus hearstiorum, growing on the coastal bluffs.

== Description ==
The Ceanothus maritimus is a spreading or ascending shrub under a meter in height with reddish gray bark aging to gray. The firm evergreen leaves are oppositely arranged, each oval or oblong in shape with a pointed, flat, or notched tip. The leaves are under 2 centimeters long, shiny green on top and woolly underneath, with their edges curled under and sometimes toothed. The inflorescence is a small cluster of deep blue to off-white flowers. The fruit is a capsule about 6 millimeters long which is generally rounded with tiny horns on top.
