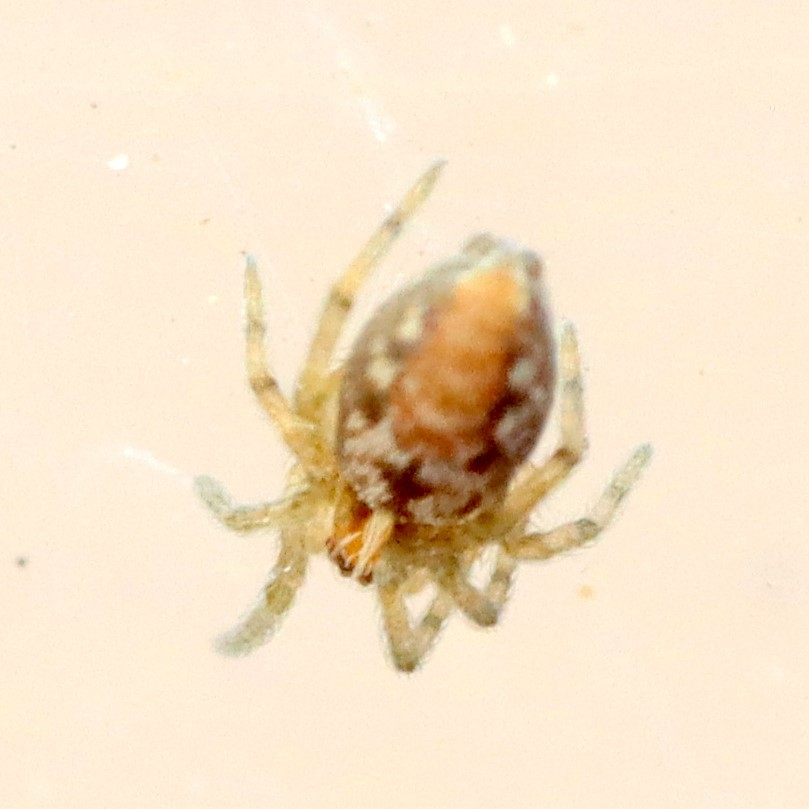

Conservation status
- Least Concern (SANBI Red List)

Scientific classification
- Kingdom: Animalia
- Phylum: Arthropoda
- Subphylum: Chelicerata
- Class: Arachnida
- Order: Araneae
- Infraorder: Araneomorphae
- Family: Dictynidae
- Genus: Mashimo
- Species: M. leleupi

Binomial name
- Mashimo leleupi Lehtinen, 1967

= Mashimo =

Mashimo Mesh-web Spider

Genus of spiders

Mashimo leleupi is a species of spider in the family Dictynidae. It is commonly known as the Mashimo mesh-web spider and is the only species in the monotypic genus Mashimo.

== Distribution ==
Mashimo leleupi is an African endemic originally described from Zambia. In South Africa, it has been recorded from five provinces, Eastern Cape, KwaZulu-Natal, Limpopo, Mpumalanga, and Western Cape. The species occurs at altitudes ranging from 4 to 1,513 m above sea level.

== Habitat and ecology ==
Mashimo leleupi has been sampled from pitfall traps and low vegetation in the Grassland, Indian Ocean Coastal Belt, Savanna and Thicket biomes. Little is known about their specific behaviour, though they are retreat-web spiders.

== Description ==
Mashimo leleupi is known from both sexes. Females and males measure 4-6 mm in total body size.The carapace is pear-shaped with a groove separating the cephalic region from the thoracic region and radiating depressions. The eyes are small and arranged in two rows, with the eye region being broad.

The chelicerae are strong with four strong teeth on the anterior margin of the cheliceral furrow. The sternum is heart-shaped, being as wide as it is long. The abdomen is long and oval with white reticulation. The leg coxae are whitish while the rest of the segments are yellow, and the calamistrum consists of 18-19 strongly curved hairs.

== Conservation ==
Mashimo leleupi is listed as Least Concern by the South African National Biodiversity Institute due to its wide range. The species is protected in seven protected areas including Addo National Park, Mkambathi Nature Reserve, Ndumo Game Reserve, and Blouberg Nature Reserve.
