= Altella hungarica =

Scientific classification
- Kingdom: Animalia
- Phylum: Arthropoda
- Subphylum: Chelicerata
- Class: Arachnida
- Order: Araneae
- Infraorder: Araneomorphae
- Family: Argyronetidae
- Genus: Altella
- Species: A. hungarica

Binomial name
- Altella hungarica Loksa, 1981

Species of spider

Altella hungarica is a spider species found in France, Germany, Hungary, Ukraine, and Russia.
