= Altella biuncata =

Scientific classification
- Kingdom: Animalia
- Phylum: Arthropoda
- Subphylum: Chelicerata
- Class: Arachnida
- Order: Araneae
- Infraorder: Araneomorphae
- Family: Argyronetidae
- Genus: Altella
- Species: A. biuncata

Binomial name
- Altella biuncata (Miller, 1949)

Species of spider

Altella biuncata is a spider species found in Central Europe.
