= Clitistes =

Scientific classification
- Kingdom: Animalia
- Phylum: Arthropoda
- Subphylum: Chelicerata
- Class: Arachnida
- Order: Araneae
- Infraorder: Araneomorphae
- Family: Dictynidae
- Genus: Clitistes; Simon, 1902
- Species: C. velutinus

Binomial name
- Clitistes velutinus Simon, 1902

Genus of spiders

Clitistes is a monotypic genus of araneomorph spiders in the family Dictynidae, containing the single species, Clitistes velutinus. It was first described by Eugène Simon in 1902, and is only found in Chile.
