= Altella aussereri =

Scientific classification
- Kingdom: Animalia
- Phylum: Arthropoda
- Subphylum: Chelicerata
- Class: Arachnida
- Order: Araneae
- Infraorder: Araneomorphae
- Family: Argyronetidae
- Genus: Altella
- Species: A. aussereri

Binomial name
- Altella aussereri Thaler, 1990

Species of spider

Altella aussereri is a spider species found in Italy.
