= Myanmardictyna =

Scientific classification
- Domain: Eukaryota
- Kingdom: Animalia
- Phylum: Arthropoda
- Subphylum: Chelicerata
- Class: Arachnida
- Order: Araneae
- Infraorder: Araneomorphae
- Family: Dictynidae
- Genus: Myanmardictyna; Wunderlich, 2017
- Species: M. longifissum

Binomial name
- Myanmardictyna longifissum Wunderlich, 2017

Genus of spiders

Myanmardictyna is a genus of araneomorph spiders in the family Dictynidae, containing the single species, Myanmardictyna longifissum. It was first described by J. Wunderlich in 2017, and is only found in Myanmar.
