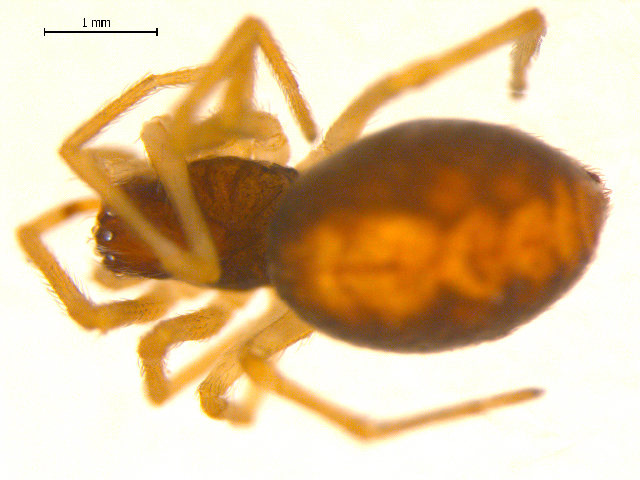

Conservation status
- Secure (NatureServe)

Scientific classification
- Kingdom: Animalia
- Phylum: Arthropoda
- Subphylum: Chelicerata
- Class: Arachnida
- Order: Araneae
- Infraorder: Araneomorphae
- Family: Dictynidae
- Genus: Dictyna
- Species: D. foliacea

Binomial name
- Dictyna foliacea (Hentz, 1850)

= Dictyna foliacea =

Species of spider

Dictyna foliacea is a species of mesh web weaver in the family Dictynidae. It is found in the US and Canada.
