= Arangina pluva =

Conservation status
- Not Threatened (NZ TCS)

Scientific classification
- Kingdom: Animalia
- Phylum: Arthropoda
- Subphylum: Chelicerata
- Class: Arachnida
- Order: Araneae
- Infraorder: Araneomorphae
- Family: Dictynidae
- Genus: Arangina
- Species: A. pluva

Binomial name
- Arangina pluva Forster, 1970

Species of spider

Arangina pluva is a species of Dictynidae spider that is endemic to New Zealand.

== Taxonomy ==
This species was described in 1970 by Ray Forster from male and female specimens collected in Pohangina Valley. The holotype is stored in Otago Museum.

== Description ==
The male is recorded at 3.91mm in length whereas the female is 5.18mm. This species has a dark brown carapace, pale yellow brown legs and mottled grey abdomen that has a faint chevron pattern dorsally.

== Distribution ==
This species is only known from a few locations in the North Island of New Zealand.

== Conservation status ==
Under the New Zealand Threat Classification System, this species is listed as "Not Threatened".
