= Kharitonovia =

Scientific classification
- Domain: Eukaryota
- Kingdom: Animalia
- Phylum: Arthropoda
- Subphylum: Chelicerata
- Class: Arachnida
- Order: Araneae
- Infraorder: Araneomorphae
- Family: Dictynidae
- Genus: Kharitonovia; Esyunin, Zamani & Tuneva, 2017
- Species: K. uzbekistanica

Binomial name
- Kharitonovia uzbekistanica (Charitonov, 1946)

Synonyms
- Dictyna uzbekistanica Charitonov, 1946

Genus of spiders

Kharitonovia is a genus of araneomorph spiders in the family Dictynidae, containing the single species, Kharitonovia uzbekistanica. It was first described by S. L. Esyunin, Alireza Zamani & T. K. Tuneva in 2017, and is only found in Iran and Uzbekistan.
