= Arangina cornigera =

Conservation status
- Not Threatened (NZ TCS)

Scientific classification
- Domain: Eukaryota
- Kingdom: Animalia
- Phylum: Arthropoda
- Subphylum: Chelicerata
- Class: Arachnida
- Order: Araneae
- Infraorder: Araneomorphae
- Family: Dictynidae
- Genus: Arangina
- Species: A. cornigera

Binomial name
- Arangina cornigera (Dalmas, 1917)

Synonyms
- Dictyna cornigera Dictyna nigella Dictyna decolora Arangina nigella

Species of spider

Arangina cornigera is a species of Dictynidae spider that is endemic to New Zealand.

== Taxonomy ==
This species was described as "Dictyna cornigera" and "Dictyna nigella" in 1917 by Raymond Comte de Dalmas from female and male specimens collected in Canterbury. It has undergone several revisions since its first description. The species was most recently revised in 1970. The holotype is stored in the National Museum of Natural History, France.

== Description ==
The male is recorded at 3mm in length whereas the female is 3.12mm. The cephalothorax is sooty brown, almost black and is covered in a patch of white hairs. The abdomen is grey with chevrons dorsally.

== Distribution ==
This species is only known from the South Island of New Zealand. Like all Arangina, it lives under stones along rivers.

== Conservation status ==
Under the New Zealand Threat Classification System, this species is listed as "Not Threatened".
