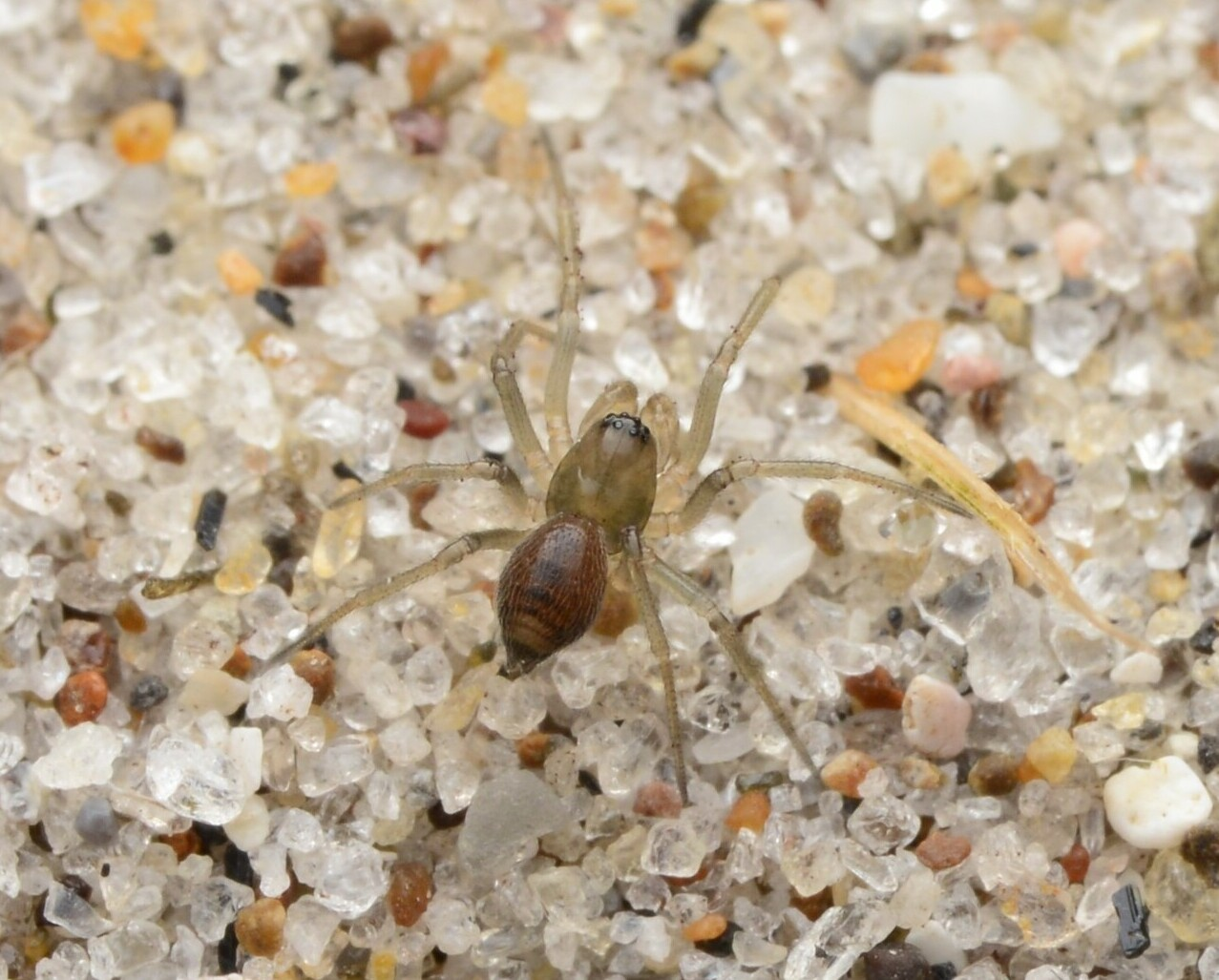
- juvenile male P. draneyi in New Zealand

Scientific classification
- Kingdom: Animalia
- Phylum: Arthropoda
- Subphylum: Chelicerata
- Class: Arachnida
- Order: Araneae
- Family: Argyronetidae
- Genus: Paratheuma; Bryant, 1940

Type species
- P. insulana (Banks, 1902)

Species
- 12, see text

Synonyms
- Corteza Roth & Brown, 1975; Litisedes Oi, 1960; Swainsia Marples, 1964

= Paratheuma =

Genus of spiders

Paratheuma is a genus of cribellate araneomorph spiders in the family Argyronetidae. It was first described by Elizabeth B. Bryant in 1940. Originally placed with the ground spiders, it was transferred to the intertidal spiders in 1975, and to the Dictynidae in 2016.

== Species ==
As of October 2025, this genus includes twelve species:

- Paratheuma andromeda Beatty & Berry, 1989 – Cook Islands
- Paratheuma armata (Marples, 1964) – Caroline Islands to Samoa
- Paratheuma australis Beatty & Berry, 1989 – Australia (Queensland), Fiji
- Paratheuma awasensis Shimojana, 2013 – Japan (Okinawa)
- Paratheuma draneyi Berry, 2024 – New Zealand
- Paratheuma enigmatica Zamani, Marusik & Berry, 2016 – Iran
- Paratheuma insulana (Banks, 1902) – United States, Caribbean. Introduced to China (Hainan), Japan (type species)
- Paratheuma interaesta (Roth & Brown, 1975) – Mexico
- Paratheuma makai Berry & Beatty, 1989 – Hawaii
- Paratheuma ramseyae Beatty & Berry, 1989 – Cook Islands
- Paratheuma rangiroa Beatty & Berry, 1989 – Polynesia
- Paratheuma shirahamaensis (Oi, 1960) – China, Korea, Japan
