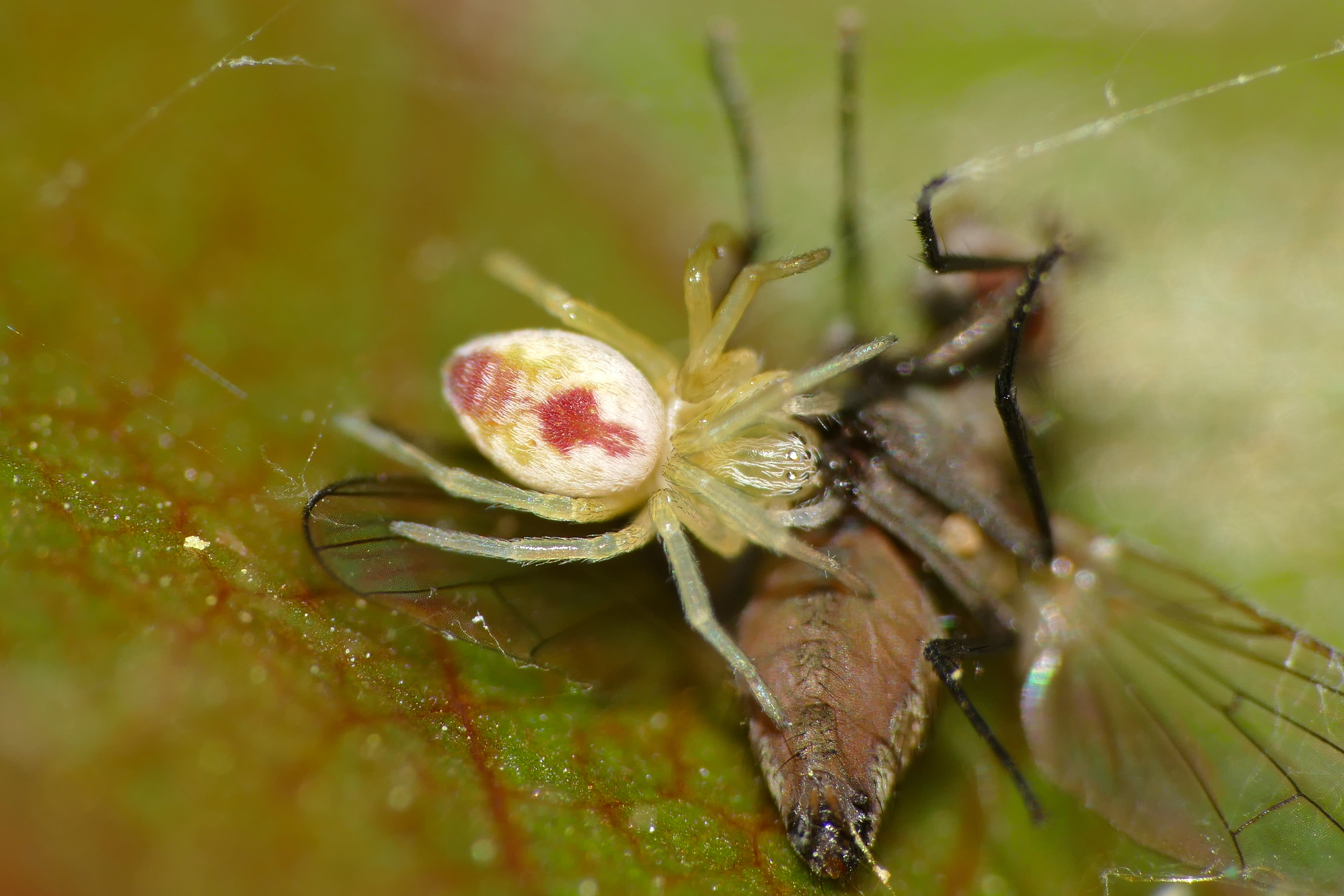
- Nigma puella catching a small fly (Muscidae)

Scientific classification
- Kingdom: Animalia
- Phylum: Arthropoda
- Subphylum: Chelicerata
- Class: Arachnida
- Order: Araneae
- Infraorder: Araneomorphae
- Family: Dictynidae
- Genus: Nigma
- Species: N. puella

Binomial name
- Nigma puella (Simon, 1870)

Synonyms
- Dictyna puella Heterodictyna puella Dictyna lobensis Dictyna eburnea Nigma canariensis

= Nigma puella =

Species of spider

Nigma puella is a species of spider belonging to the family Dictynidae. It is found in Europe, Azores, Madeira, Canary Islands and parts of North Africa.

Like most members of the family, this is a small spider but the female is striking, with a light green abdomen marked with a bold maroon blotch and a variable amount of barring in the same colour. The male is reddish brown. This species makes a horizontal web over the top surface of a leaf.
