= Tivyna moaba =

Scientific classification
- Kingdom: Animalia
- Phylum: Arthropoda
- Subphylum: Chelicerata
- Class: Arachnida
- Order: Araneae
- Infraorder: Araneomorphae
- Family: Dictynidae
- Genus: Tivyna
- Species: T. moaba

Binomial name
- Tivyna moaba (Ivie, 1947)

Species of spider

Tivyna moaba is a species of mesh web weaver in the family of spiders known as Dictynidae, and is found in the US.
