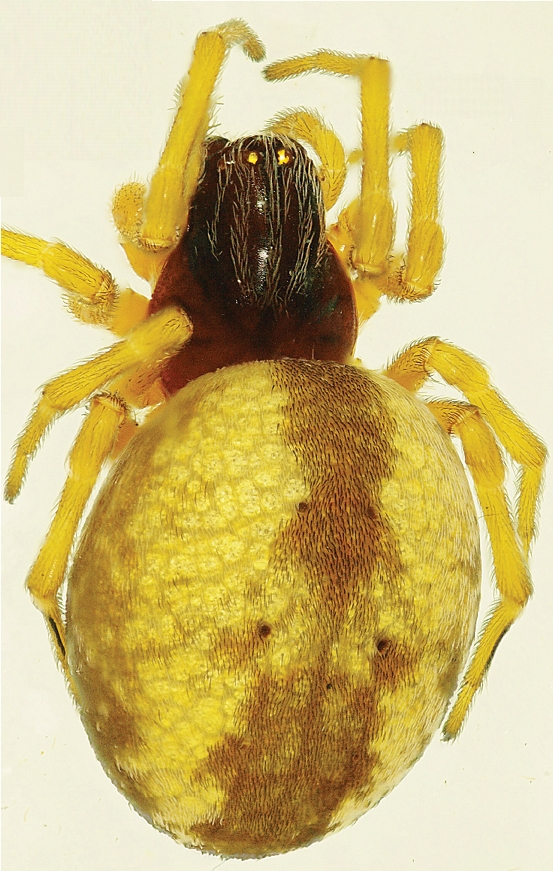

Conservation status
- Secure (NatureServe)

Scientific classification
- Kingdom: Animalia
- Phylum: Arthropoda
- Subphylum: Chelicerata
- Class: Arachnida
- Order: Araneae
- Infraorder: Araneomorphae
- Family: Dictynidae
- Genus: Dictyna
- Species: D. major

Binomial name
- Dictyna major Menge, 1869

= Dictyna major =

Species of spider

Dictyna major is a species of mesh web weaver in the spider family Dictynidae. It is found in North America, Europe, a range from Russia to Tajikistan, and China.

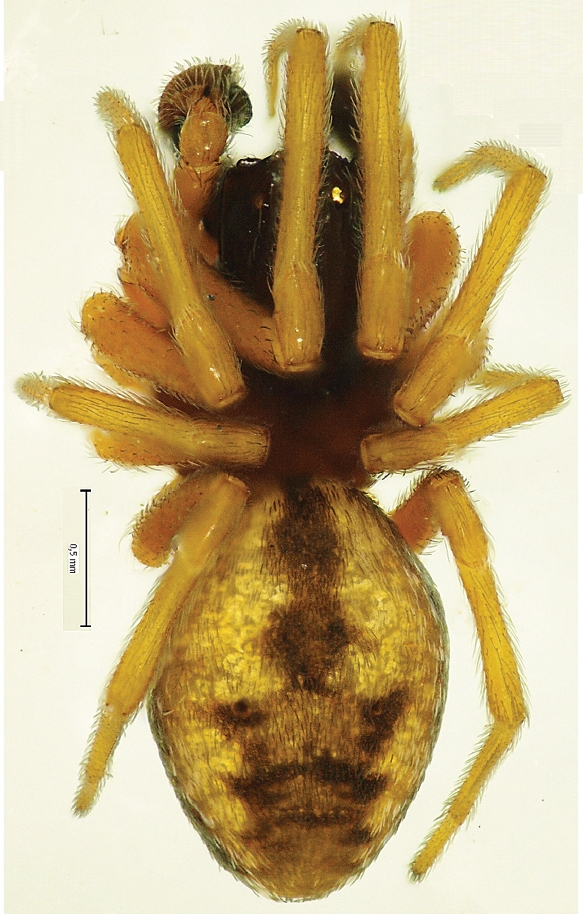
