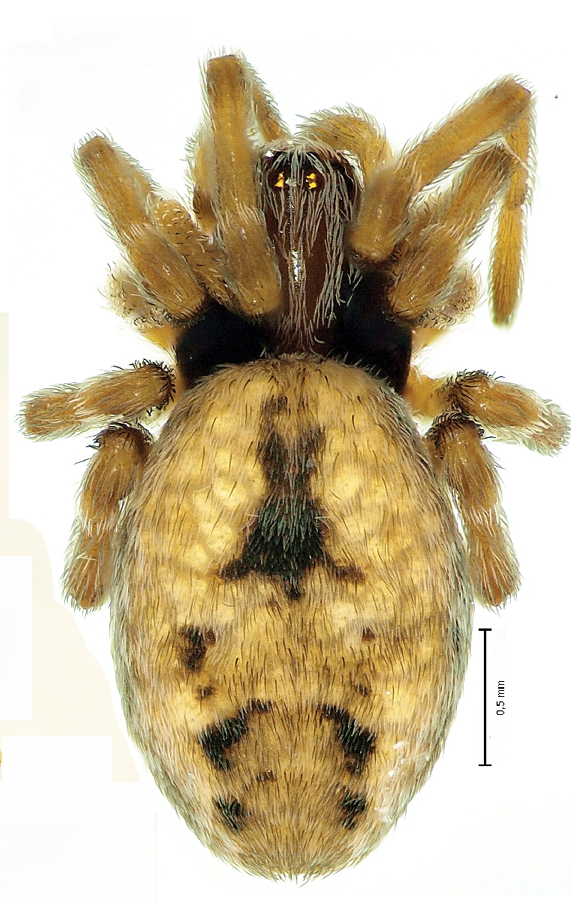
- Dictyna palmgreni, female

Scientific classification
- Kingdom: Animalia
- Phylum: Arthropoda
- Subphylum: Chelicerata
- Class: Arachnida
- Order: Araneae
- Infraorder: Araneomorphae
- Family: Dictynidae
- Genus: Dictyna
- Species: D. palmgreni

Binomial name
- Dictyna palmgreni Marusik & Fritzén, 2011

= Dictyna palmgreni =

Species of spider

Dictyna palmgreni is a spider species found in Finland and Russia.
