= Cribellum =

Anatomical structure

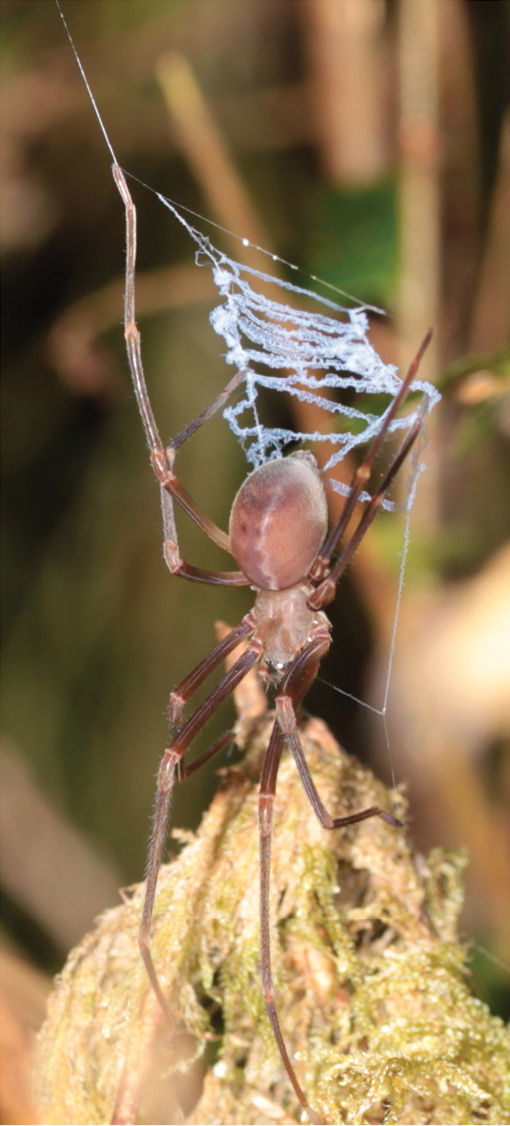
Progradungula otwayensis (Gradungulidae) holding a snare made from silk spun from its cribellum

Cribellum literally means 'little sieve', and in biology the term generally applies to anatomical structures in the form of tiny perforated plates.

In certain groups of diatoms it refers to microscopically punctured regions of the frustule, or outer layer.

In certain groups of spider species, so-called cribellate spiders, the cribellum is a silk spinning organ. Unlike the usual spinnerets of spiders, the cribellum consists of one or more plates covered in thousands of tiny spigots, tiny holes that hardly project from the surface, in contrast to the elongated spigots that project from spinnerets. These minute spigots produce extremely fine fibers, merely tens of nanometres thick, which are combed out by the spider's calamistrum, producing silk with a woolly texture.

The fibers are so small in diameter that they are strongly subject to Van der Waals forces. In addition, the fibres have a surface that absorbs waxes from the epicuticle of insect prey on contact. This creates a powerful adhesion without any liquid glue that tends to dry out.

The spider cribellum is a functional homolog of the anterior median spinnerets of Mesothelae and Mygalomorphae, which do not have a cribellum.

== Ancestral trait ==
The presence or absence of a cribellum is used to classify araneomorph spiders into the cribellate and ecribellate (not cribellate) type. The distinction can be used to study evolutionary relationships. However, in 1967 it was discovered that there are many families with both cribellate and ecribellate members (Lehtinen, 1967). Some species, such as Amaurobius ferox, are also capable of switching between cribellate and ecribellate silk, primarily using cribellate silk for webs and ecribellate silk for trophic eggs.

Today, it is believed that the precursor of all Araneomorphae was cribellate (symplesiomorphy), and that this function was lost in some araneomorph spiders secondarily (Coddington & Levy, 1991). Many of these still retain a colulus, which is thought to be a reduced cribellum, and is of unknown function. However, some "ecribellate" spiders seem to have evolved independently, without cribellate precursors (Foelix, 1979). In Austrochilidae, the cribellum is developed only in the second nymphal stage, so the ecribellate and cribellate conditions change during the spider ontogenesis.

== Prevalence ==
Only about 180 genera in 23 families (1991) still contain cribellate members, although the diverse Australian cribellate fauna is still mostly undescribed. However, that fauna may be an example of high diversity in Australian animals that are only relicts in other regions of the world, like the marsupials (Coddington & Levy, 1991).

Cribellate taxa are not very speciose, and for nearly all cribellate-ecribellate sister clades the cribellate lineage is less diverse (Coddington & Levy, 1991), for example:

- Haplogynae: cribellate Filistatidae c. 100 species, all others (mostly ecribellate) c. 3,000 species
- Entelegynae: cribellate Deinopoidea c. 320 species, ecribellate Araneoidea c. 11,000 species

== Cribellate families ==
Twenty-two families of araneomorph spiders, namely Agelenidae, Amaurobiidae, Amphinectidae, Austrochilidae, Ctenidae, Deinopidae, Desidae, Dictynidae, Eresidae, Filistatidae, Gradungulidae, Hypochilidae, Miturgidae, Neolanidae, Nicodamidae, Oecobiidae, Psechridae, Stiphidiidae, Tengellidae, Titanoecidae, Uloboridae and Zoropsidae contain at least some cribellate spiders. While some of these families are entirely cribellate, others contain both cribellate and ecribellate species.

== Diatom cribellum ==
The perforated regions of the frustule, or outside layer of many forms of diatom also are called cribella. In such species of diatom the frustule consists of a thin siliceous plate with many small pores.
