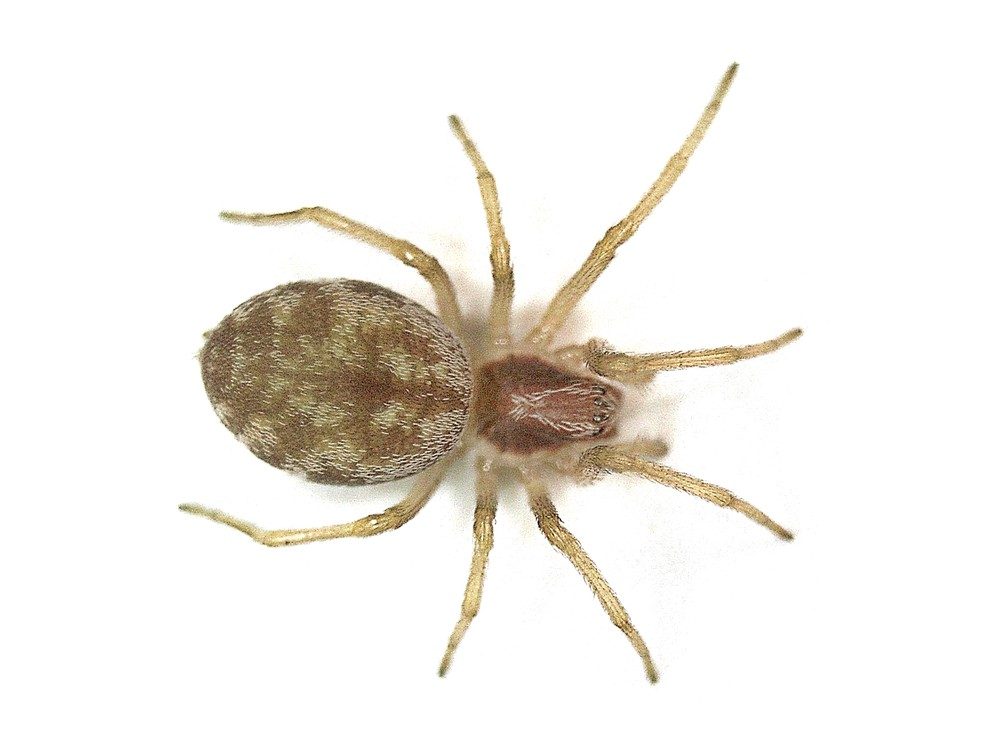
- female from the Netherlands
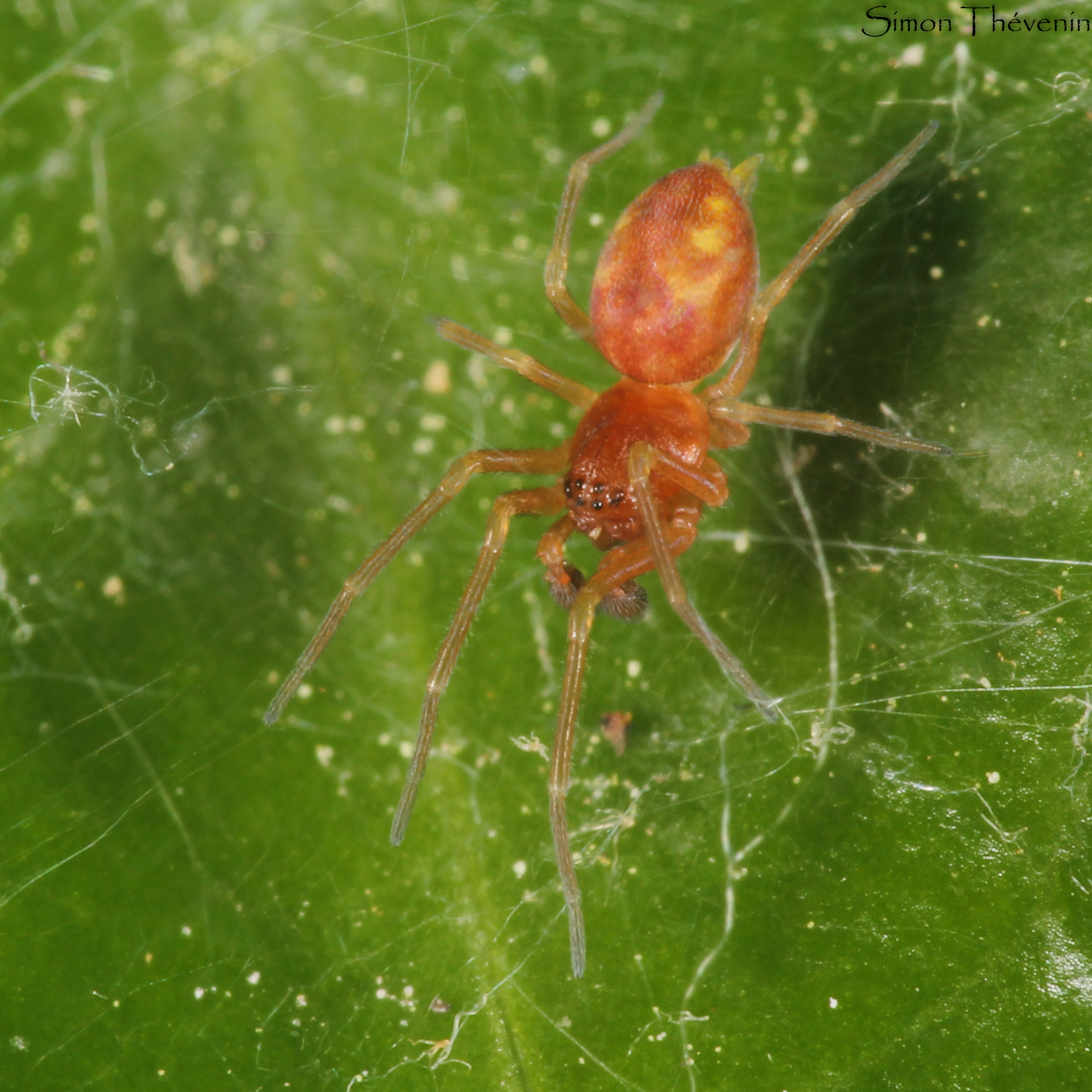
- male from France

Scientific classification
- Kingdom: Animalia
- Phylum: Arthropoda
- Subphylum: Chelicerata
- Class: Arachnida
- Order: Araneae
- Infraorder: Araneomorphae
- Family: Dictynidae
- Genus: Nigma
- Species: N. flavescens

Binomial name
- Nigma flavescens (Walckenaer, 1830)

Synonyms
- Drassus flavescens Walckenaer, 1830; Theridion viride Wider, 1834; Dictyna variabilis C. L. Koch, 1836; Ergatis flavescens (Blackwall, 1841); Argus flavescens (Walckenaer, 1847); Ergatis pallens Blackwall, 1859; Dictyna orientalis Kulczyński, 1895; Heterodictyna flavescens (Dahl, 1924)

= Nigma flavescens =

Species of spider

Nigma flavescens is a species of spider in the family Dictynidae. Originally described as Drassus flavescens by Walckenaer in 1830, it has undergone several taxonomic revisions and generic transfers before being placed in its current genus Nigma by Lehtinen in 1967.

== Taxonomy ==
The species was first described by Charles Athanase Walckenaer in 1830 as Drassus flavescens based on specimens from France. The species has a complex taxonomic history with numerous synonymizations and generic transfers. It was subsequently placed in the genera Theridion, Dictyna, Ergatis, Argus, and Heterodictyna by various authors throughout the 19th and early 20th centuries.

In 1967, Lehtinen transferred the species to the genus Nigma, where it currently resides. The genus Nigma belongs to the family Dictynidae, commonly known as mesh web weavers.

== Distribution ==
N. flavescens is widely distributed across Europe, the Caucasus, and Iran. The species has been recorded from numerous European countries and was notably rediscovered in Britain in recent years after a long absence from records.

== Habitat ==
According to the original description by Walckenaer, N. flavescens is found particularly in June on the leaves of orange and lilac trees.

== Description ==
Nigma flavescens shows distinct sexual dimorphism in coloration and body proportions. The female has a reddish-brown cephalothorax and a dark yellow abdomen with lighter markings, while the legs are yellowish. The male is more uniformly colored, with the cephalothorax, legs, and abdomen all being reddish-brown. The male also has more elongated proportions in both the abdomen and cephalothorax compared to the female.

The species constructs loose, flattened cocoon-like structures to protect its eggs, which are attached to leaves. The female may produce four to five egg batches during her reproductive period.
