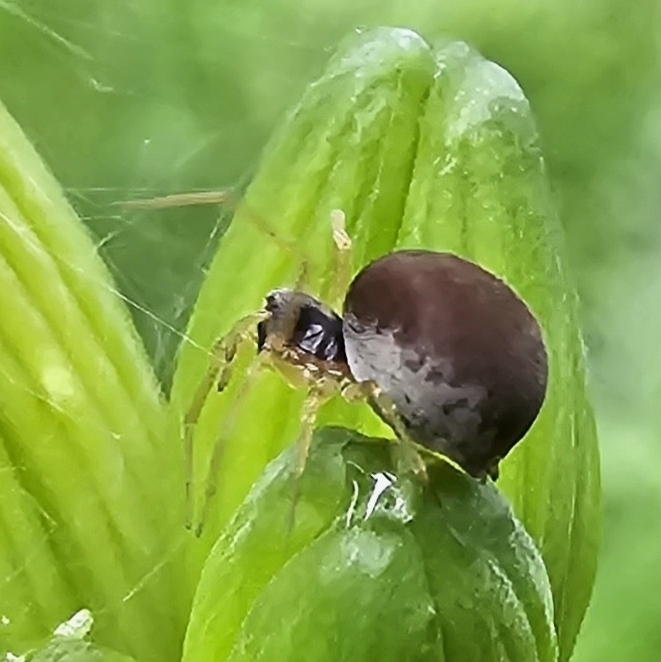
- female
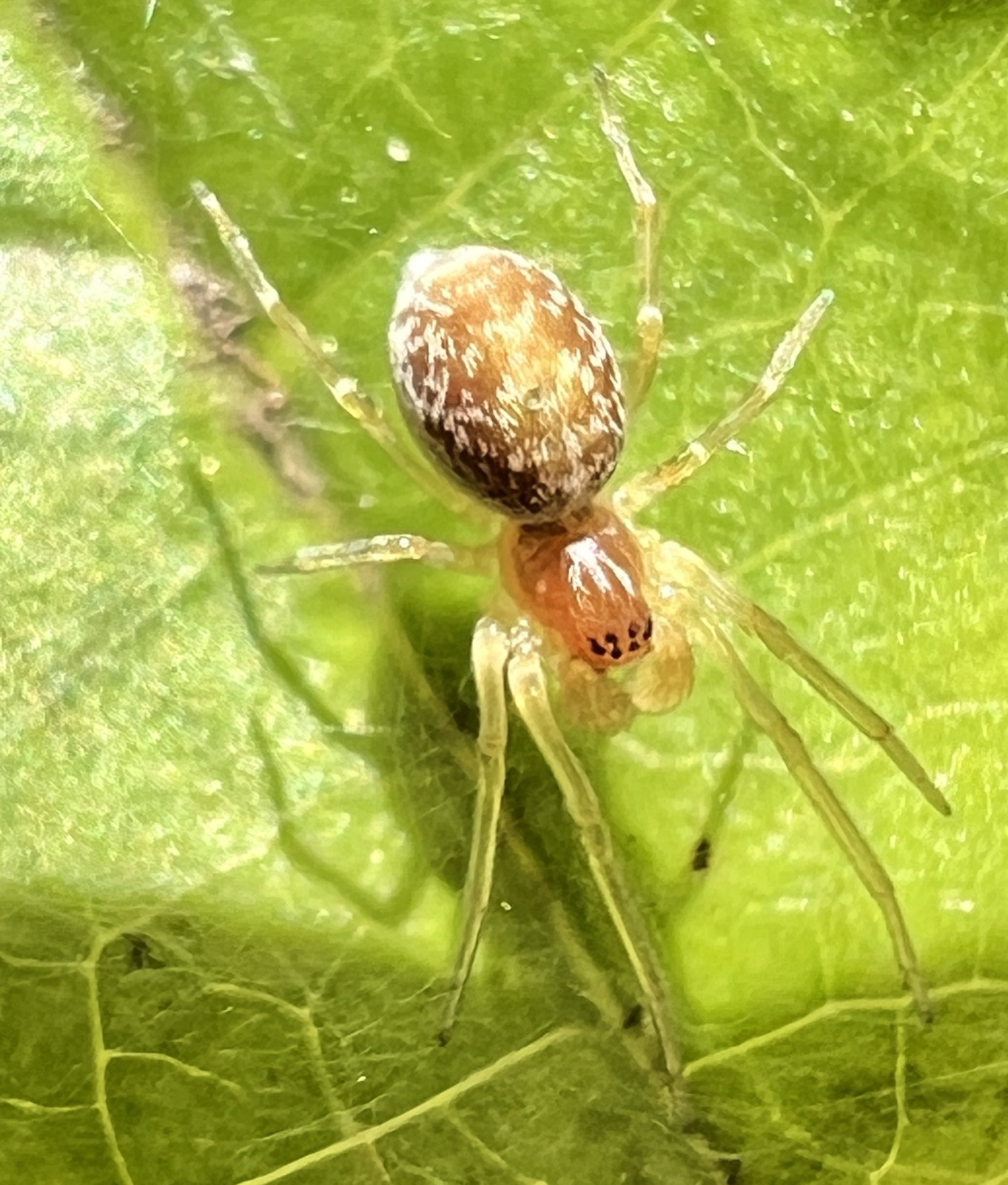
- male

Scientific classification
- Kingdom: Animalia
- Phylum: Arthropoda
- Subphylum: Chelicerata
- Class: Arachnida
- Order: Araneae
- Infraorder: Araneomorphae
- Family: Dictynidae
- Genus: Nopalityna; Cala-Riquelme & Esposito, 2025

Type species
- Theridion sublatum Hentz, 1850

Species
- 6, see text

= Nopalityna =

Genus of spiders

Nopalityna is a genus of spiders in the family Dictynidae.

== Distribution ==
Nopalityna occurs in North America, with species distributed across the United States, Canada, and Mexico.

== Description ==
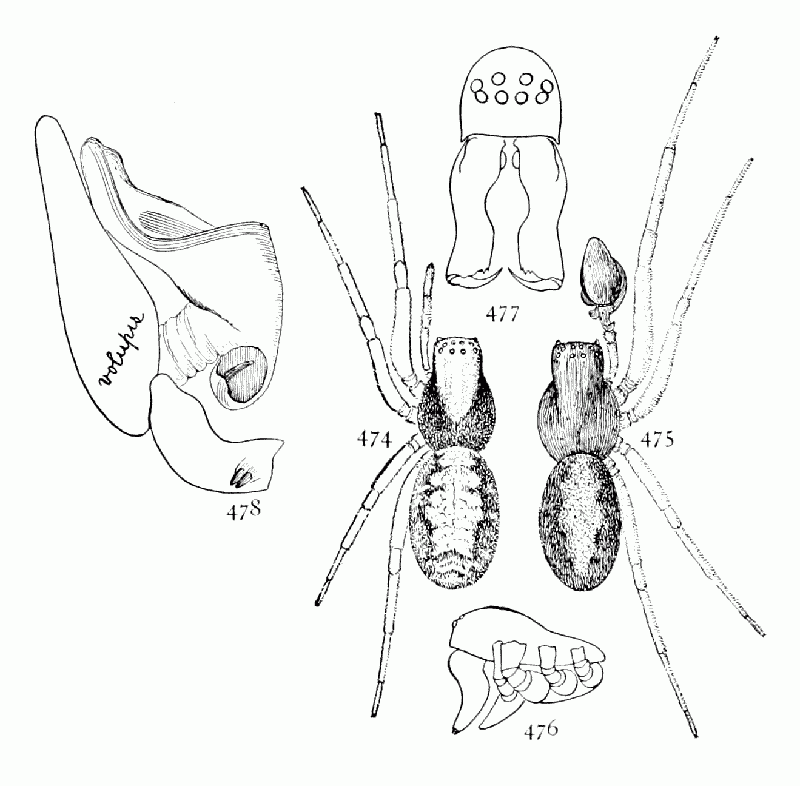
Diagnostic drawings of N. sublata (female and male)

== Etymology ==
The genus name is a combination of nopalito, a Mexican dish made from diced nopales (the stems of prickly pair cactuses), and the ending -yna, in this case referring to the genus Emblyna, where the type species was originally placed.

== Species ==
As of October 2025, this genus includes six species:

- Nopalityna francisca (Bishop & Ruderman, 1946) – United States
- Nopalityna jonesae (Roewer, 1955) – Canada, United States
- Nopalityna orbiculata (Jones, 1947) – United States
- Nopalityna sublata (Hentz, 1850) – Canada, United States, Mexico (type species)
- Nopalityna suprenans (Chamberlin & Ivie, 1935) – United States
- Nopalityna uintana (Chamberlin, 1919) – United States
