= Spagnius =

Scientific classification
- Kingdom: Animalia
- Phylum: Arthropoda
- Subphylum: Chelicerata
- Class: Arachnida
- Order: Araneae
- Infraorder: Araneomorphae
- Family: Dictynidae
- Genus: Spagnius; Cala-Riquelme & Crews, 2025

Type species
- Theridion foliaceum Hentz, 1850

Species
- 4, see text

Genus of spiders

Spagnius is a genus of spiders in the family Dictynidae.

== Distribution ==
Spagnius is distributed across North America, occurring in Canada, the United States, and Mexico, with one species endemic to Cuba.

== Etymology ==
The genus is named after entomologist Joseph C. Spagna (1973-2024).

== Taxonomy ==
Males resemble the genus Eriena. The species included in this genus were previously part of the wastebasket taxon Dictyna.

== Species ==
As of October 2025, this genus includes four species:

- Spagnius albopilosus (Franganillo, 1936) – Cuba
- Spagnius foliaceus (Hentz, 1850) – Canada, United States (type species)
- Spagnius jacalana (Gertsch & Davis, 1937) – Mexico
- Spagnius nebraska (Gertsch, 1946) – United States
