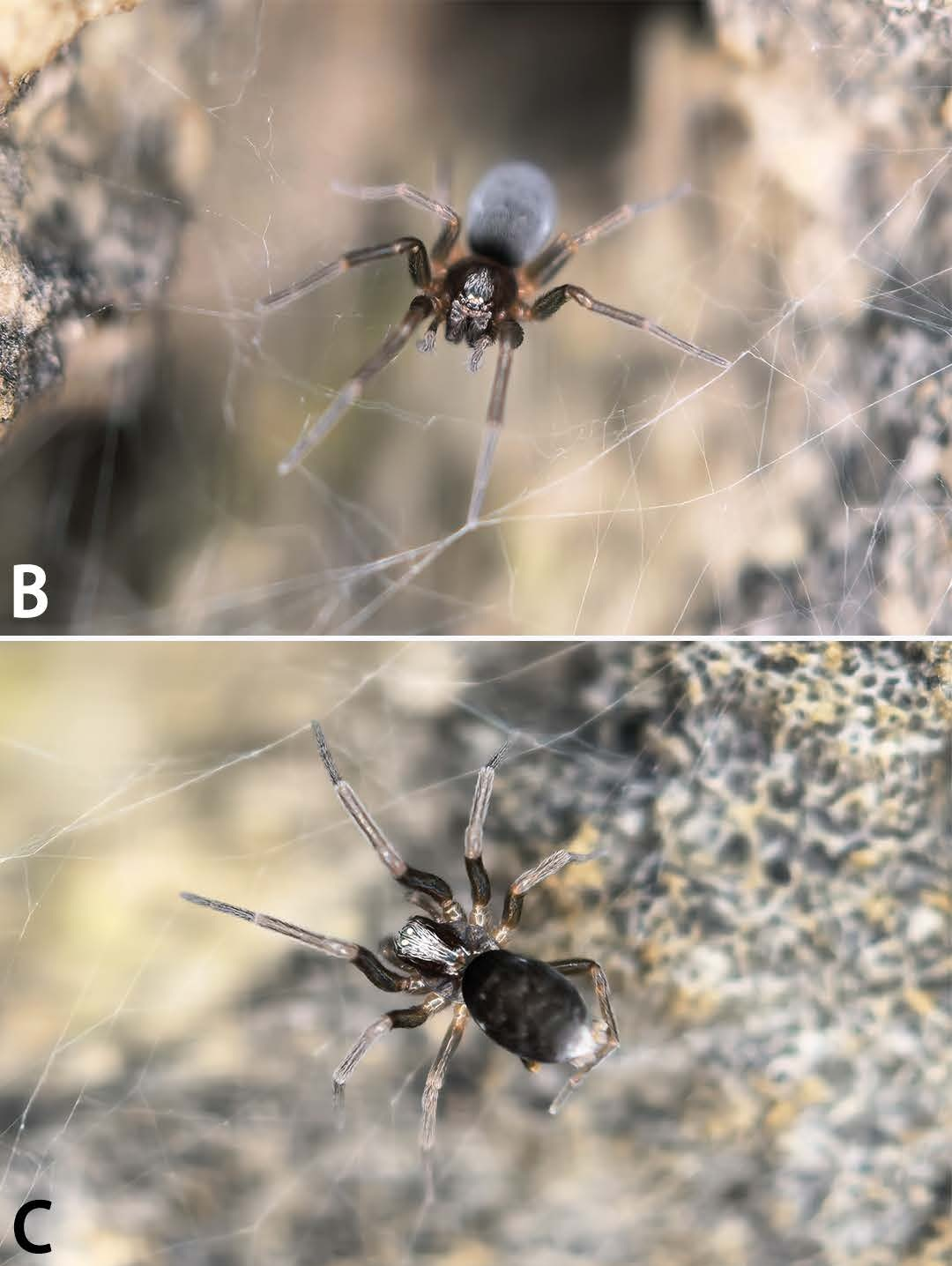
- female and male

Scientific classification
- Kingdom: Animalia
- Phylum: Arthropoda
- Subphylum: Chelicerata
- Class: Arachnida
- Order: Araneae
- Infraorder: Araneomorphae
- Family: Dictynidae
- Genus: Maretyna; Lin & Liu, 2025
- Species: M. nongchao

Binomial name
- Maretyna nongchao Lin & Liu, 2025

= Maretyna =

Species of spider

Maretyna is a Chinese monotypic genus of spiders in the family Dictynidae containing the single species, Maretyna nongchao.

The Chinese name given to this spider by the authors is 弄潮海卷叶蛛; Nòng cháo hǎi juàn yè zhū.

== Distribution ==
Maretyna nongchao is endemic to Hainan province in China. It has been collected in Sanya City on the southern coast of Hainan.

== Life style ==
M. nongchao is an intertidal species in tropical Hainan. The habitat of this new species is completely submerged at high tide.

== Etymology ==
The genus name is a combination of Latin mare (ocean) and the ending of related genus Dictyna, indicating that this is the first described intertidal species of Dictynidae.

The specific name is from 弄潮; Nòng cháo "riding the tide".
