= Dictyna bostoniensis =

Conservation status
- Secure (NatureServe)

Scientific classification
- Kingdom: Animalia
- Phylum: Arthropoda
- Subphylum: Chelicerata
- Class: Arachnida
- Order: Araneae
- Infraorder: Araneomorphae
- Family: Dictynidae
- Genus: Dictyna
- Species: D. bostoniensis

Binomial name
- Dictyna bostoniensis Emerton, 1888

Species of spider

Dictyna bostoniensis is a species of mesh web weaver in the spider family Dictynidae. It is found in the United States and Canada.
