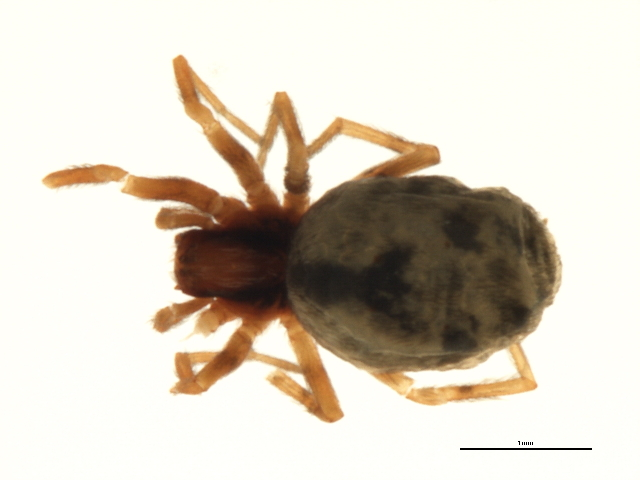
- Phantyna bicornis

Scientific classification
- Domain: Eukaryota
- Kingdom: Animalia
- Phylum: Arthropoda
- Subphylum: Chelicerata
- Class: Arachnida
- Order: Araneae
- Infraorder: Araneomorphae
- Family: Dictynidae
- Genus: Phantyna
- Species: P. bicornis

Binomial name
- Phantyna bicornis (Emerton, 1915)

= Phantyna bicornis =

Species of spider

Phantyna bicornis is a species of mesh web weaver in the spider family Dictynidae. It is found in the United States and Canada.
