= Dictyna saltona =

Scientific classification
- Domain: Eukaryota
- Kingdom: Animalia
- Phylum: Arthropoda
- Subphylum: Chelicerata
- Class: Arachnida
- Order: Araneae
- Infraorder: Araneomorphae
- Family: Dictynidae
- Genus: Dictyna
- Species: D. saltona

Binomial name
- Dictyna saltona Ralph Vary Chamberlin & Willis J. Gertsch, 1958

Species of spider

Dictyna saltona is a species of spider in the family Dictynidae. The scientific name of this species was first published in 1958 by Ralph Vary Chamberlin & Willis J. Gertsch
