= Dictyna armata =

Scientific classification
- Kingdom: Animalia
- Phylum: Arthropoda
- Subphylum: Chelicerata
- Class: Arachnida
- Order: Araneae
- Infraorder: Araneomorphae
- Family: Dictynidae
- Genus: Dictyna
- Species: D. armata

Binomial name
- Dictyna armata Thorell, 1875

Species of spider

Dictyna armata is spider species found in Ukraine and Georgia.
