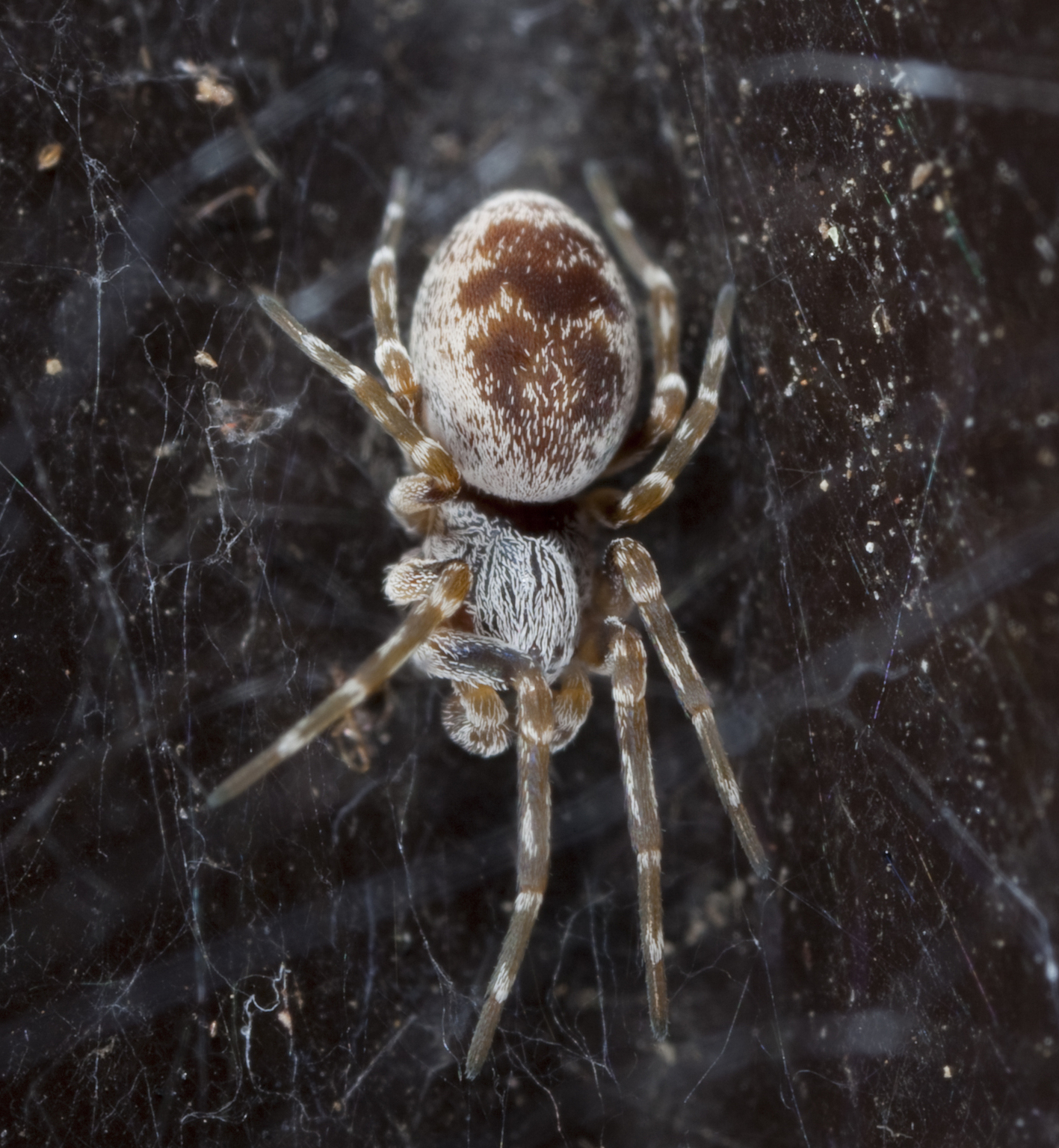
- in Japan

Scientific classification
- Kingdom: Animalia
- Phylum: Arthropoda
- Subphylum: Chelicerata
- Class: Arachnida
- Order: Araneae
- Infraorder: Araneomorphae
- Family: Dictynidae
- Genus: Shikibutyna; Cala-Riquelme, Gorneau & Esposito, 2025

Type species
- Dictyna felis Bösenberg & Strand, 1906

Species
- 9, see text

= Shikibutyna =

Genus of spiders

Shikibutyna is a genus of spiders in the family Dictynidae.

== Distribution ==
Shikibutyna is found in temperate Europe and Asia, from the Canary Islands to Japan.

== Etymology ==
The genus is named after Japanese author Murasaki Shikibu, who wrote one of the world's first novels around the year 1000. The ending refers to genus Dictyna, where the type species was originally placed.

== Taxonomy ==
The species in this genus were formally placed in Dictyna and Emblyna (S. mongolica, S. wangi, S. zherikhini).

== Species ==
As of October 2025, this genus includes nine species:

- Shikibutyna felis (Bösenberg & Strand, 1906) – Russia (Far East), Mongolia, China, Korea, Japan (type species)
- Shikibutyna foliicola (Bösenberg & Strand, 1906) – Russia (Far East), China, Korea, Japan
- Shikibutyna guanchae (Schmidt, 1968) – Canary Islands
- Shikibutyna mongolica (Marusik & Koponen, 1998) – Russia (Europe to South Siberia), Mongolia
- Shikibutyna procerula (Bösenberg & Strand, 1906) – Japan
- Shikibutyna schmidti (Kulczyński, 1926) – Russia (West Siberia to Far East)
- Shikibutyna szaboi (Chyzer, 1891) – Austria, Hungary, Czech Republic, Slovakia, Russia (Europe), Kazakhstan
- Shikibutyna wangi (Song & Zhou, 1986) – Russia (Europe to South Siberia), Kazakhstan, Mongolia, China
- Shikibutyna zherikhini (Marusik, 1988) – Russia (Middle Siberia to Far East)
