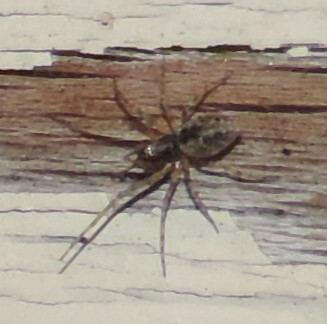
- Female in Canada
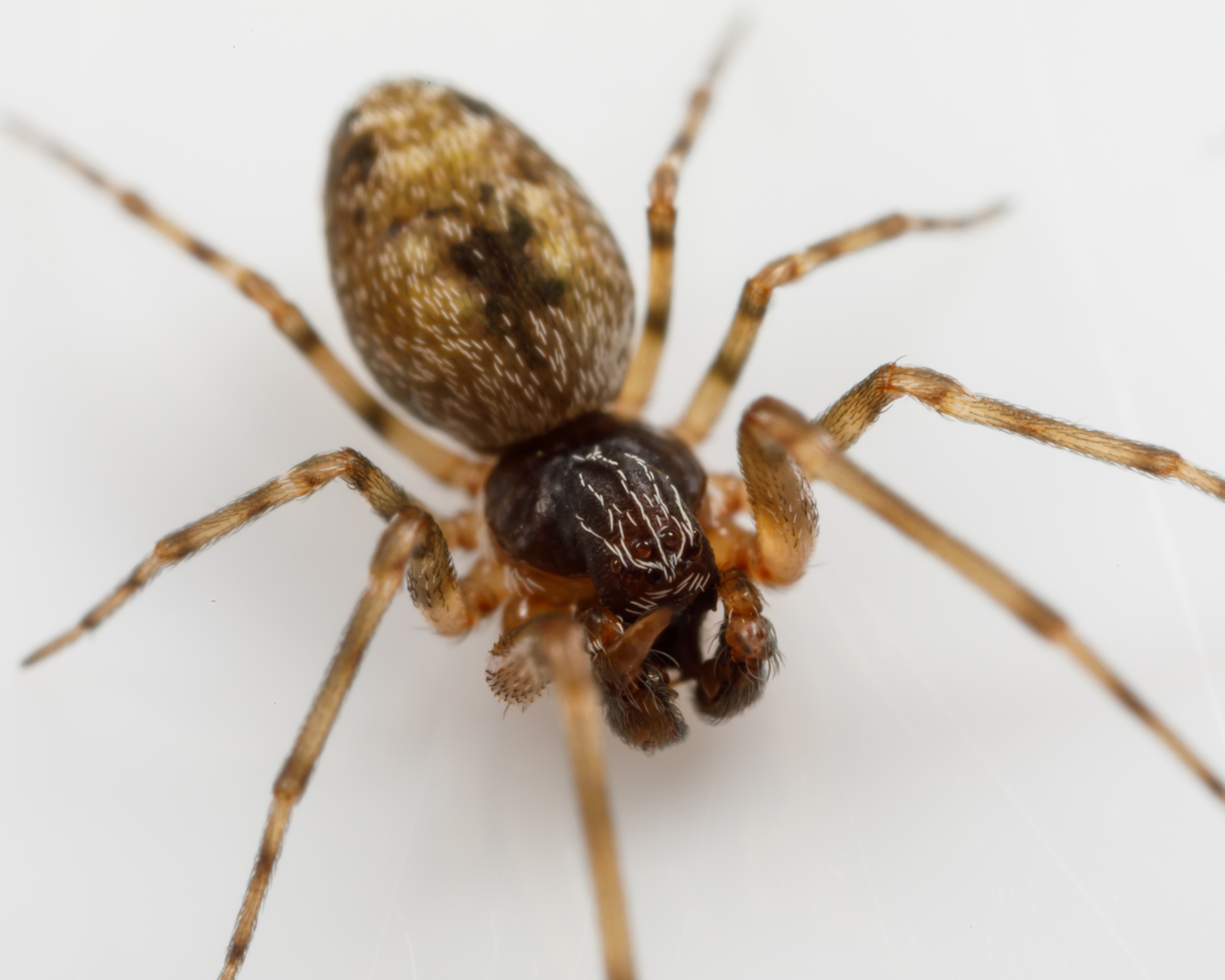
- Male in Texas

Scientific classification
- Kingdom: Animalia
- Phylum: Arthropoda
- Subphylum: Chelicerata
- Class: Arachnida
- Order: Araneae
- Infraorder: Araneomorphae
- Family: Dictynidae
- Genus: Khalotyna; Cala-Riquelme, Alequín & Esposito, 2025
- Species: K. calcarata

Binomial name
- Khalotyna calcarata (Banks, 1904)

Synonyms
- Dictyna calcarata Banks, 1904; Dictyna dactylata Chamberlin, in Chamberlin & Woodbury, 1929; Dictyna hoples Chamberlin, in Chamberlin & Woodbury, 1929; Tosyna calcarata Chamberlin, 1948

= Khalotyna =

Species of spider

Khalotyna is a monotypic genus of spiders in the family Dictynidae containing the single species, Khalotyna calcarata.

== Distribution ==
Khalotyna calcarata has been recorded in Canada, the United States and Mexico. It has been introduced to Hawaii.

== Etymology ==
The genus name is a combination of "Khalo", honoring Mexican artist Frida Kahlo (misspelled) and the ending -yna, indicating the genus Dictyna where the species originally resided.
