= Dictyna hamifera =

Scientific classification
- Kingdom: Animalia
- Phylum: Arthropoda
- Subphylum: Chelicerata
- Class: Arachnida
- Order: Araneae
- Infraorder: Araneomorphae
- Family: Dictynidae
- Genus: Dictyna
- Species: D. hamifera

Binomial name
- Dictyna hamifera Thorell, 1872

Subspecies
- Dictyna hamifera simulans Kulczynski, 1916 — Russia

Species of spider

Dictyna hamifera is spider species found in Finland and Russia.
