= Dictyna szaboi =

Scientific classification
- Kingdom: Animalia
- Phylum: Arthropoda
- Subphylum: Chelicerata
- Class: Arachnida
- Order: Araneae
- Infraorder: Araneomorphae
- Family: Dictynidae
- Genus: Dictyna
- Species: D. szaboi

Binomial name
- Dictyna szaboi Chyzer, 1891

Species of spider

Dictyna szaboi is spider species found in Hungary, Czech Republic, Slovakia and Russia.
