= Dictyna tullgreni =

Scientific classification
- Kingdom: Animalia
- Phylum: Arthropoda
- Subphylum: Chelicerata
- Class: Arachnida
- Order: Araneae
- Infraorder: Araneomorphae
- Family: Dictynidae
- Genus: Dictyna
- Species: D. tullgreni

Binomial name
- Dictyna tullgreni Caporiacco, 1949

Species of spider

Dictyna tullgreni is a species of spider in the family Dictynidae. The scientific name of this species was first published in 1949 by Lodovico di Caporiacco.
