= Dictyna agressa =

Scientific classification
- Kingdom: Animalia
- Phylum: Arthropoda
- Subphylum: Chelicerata
- Class: Arachnida
- Order: Araneae
- Infraorder: Araneomorphae
- Family: Dictynidae
- Genus: Dictyna
- Species: D. agressa

Binomial name
- Dictyna agressa Ivie, 1947

Species of spider

Dictyna agressa is a species of mesh web weaver in the spider family Dictynidae. It is found in the United States.
