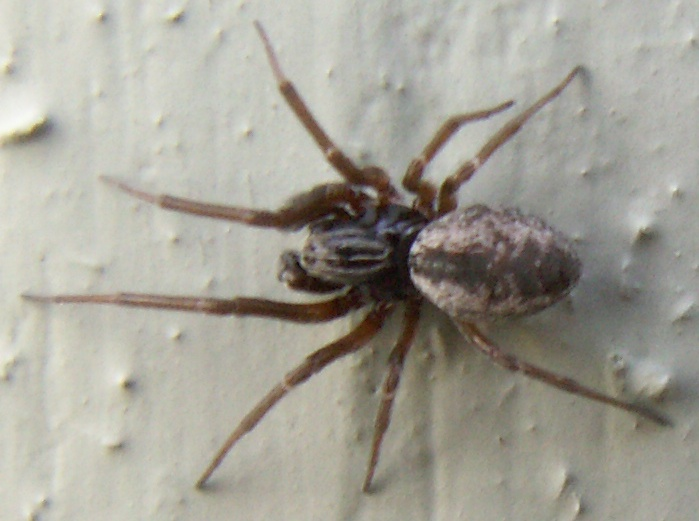

Scientific classification
- Kingdom: Animalia
- Phylum: Arthropoda
- Subphylum: Chelicerata
- Class: Arachnida
- Order: Araneae
- Infraorder: Araneomorphae
- Family: Dictynidae
- Genus: Dictyna
- Species: D. arundinacea

Binomial name
- Dictyna arundinacea Linnaeus, 1758

= Dictyna arundinacea =

Species of spider

Dictyna arundinacea is a species of spider belonging to the family Dictynidae. It has a holarctic distribution; It is found throughout Britain and northern Europe.

The body length excluding legs is about 2 to 3.5 mm, the females being slightly larger than the males. The carapace is dark brown. The head is covered with five rows of white hairs. The abdomen has a pattern of white hairs with a gap in the cardiac region and at the rear. The legs are brownish yellow.

Dictyna arundinacea normally builds webs in the dried heads of plants and on gorse and heather, but they can build on walls and other objects.
