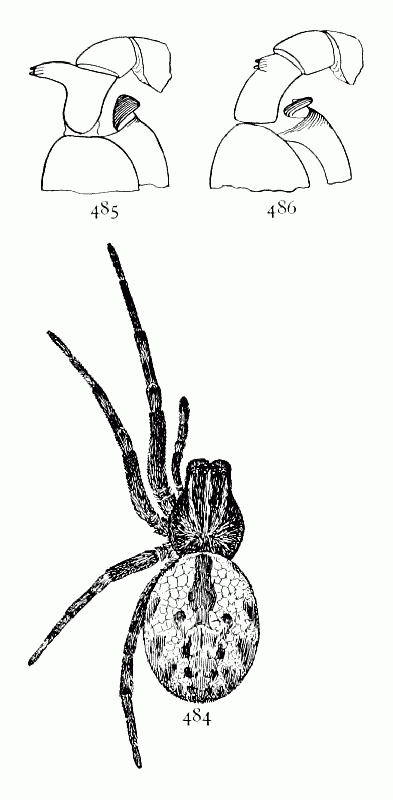

Scientific classification
- Domain: Eukaryota
- Kingdom: Animalia
- Phylum: Arthropoda
- Subphylum: Chelicerata
- Class: Arachnida
- Order: Araneae
- Infraorder: Araneomorphae
- Family: Dictynidae
- Genus: Dictyna
- Species: D. volucripes

Binomial name
- Dictyna volucripes Keyserling, 1881

= Dictyna volucripes =

Species of arachnid

Dictyna volucripes is a species of mesh web weaver in the spider family Dictynidae. It is found in North America.

== Subspecies ==
These two subspecies belong to the species Dictyna volucripes:

- (Dictyna volucripes volucripes) Keyserling, 1881
- Dictyna volucripes volucripoides Ivie, 1947
