= Simziella =

Scientific classification
- Kingdom: Animalia
- Phylum: Arthropoda
- Subphylum: Chelicerata
- Class: Arachnida
- Order: Araneae
- Infraorder: Araneomorphae
- Family: Dictynidae
- Genus: Simziella; Cala-Riquelme & Alequín, 2025

Type species
- Dictyna major Menge, 1869

Species
- 14, see text

Genus of spiders

Simziella is a genus of spiders in the family Dictynidae.

== Distribution ==
Simziella is distributed across the Northern Hemisphere, with the greatest diversity in North America and Russia. The genus occurs throughout much of North America from Canada to Mexico, across northern and eastern Europe, and extensively through Russia from the European portion eastward to the Far East and Wrangel Island.

S. major has the widest distribution, being found in North America, and Europe to China. S. teideensis is endemic to the Canary Islands.

== Etymology ==
The genus is named after the Romanian fairy tale Ileana Simziana ("The Princess Who Would Be a Prince").

== Taxonomy ==
Species in this genus were formerly placed in Dictyna and Emblyna (S. canadas, S. teideensis).

== Species ==
As of October 2025, this genus includes fourteen species and one subspecies:

- Simziella annexa (Gertsch & Mulaik, 1936) – United States, Mexico
- Simziella canadas (Wunderlich, 2022) – Canary Islands
- Simziella cebolla (Ivie, 1947) – United States
- Simziella dunini (Danilov, 2000) – Russia (Urals to Far East)
- Simziella major (Menge, 1869) – North America, Europe, Russia (Europe to Far East), Tajikistan, China (type species)
- Simziella palmgreni (Marusik & Fritzén, 2011) – Finland, Russia (Europe to north-eastern Siberia)
- Simziella paramajor (Danilov, 2000) – Russia (South Siberia)
- Simziella sancta (Gertsch, 1946) – Canada, United States
- Simziella sotnik (Danilov, 1994) – Russia (South Siberia)
- Simziella sylvania (Chamberlin & Ivie, 1944) – United States
- Simziella teideensis (Wunderlich, 1992) – Canary Islands
- Simziella tridentata (Bishop & Ruderman, 1946) – Canada, United States
- Simziella tucsona (Chamberlin, 1948) – United States, Mexico
- Simziella tyshchenkoi (Marusik, 1988) – Russia (Urals to Far East)
  - S. t. wrangeliana (Marusik, 1988) – Russia (Wrangel Island)
