= Dictyna ignobilis =

Scientific classification
- Kingdom: Animalia
- Phylum: Arthropoda
- Subphylum: Chelicerata
- Class: Arachnida
- Order: Araneae
- Infraorder: Araneomorphae
- Family: Dictynidae
- Genus: Dictyna
- Species: D. ignobilis

Binomial name
- Dictyna ignobilis Kulczynski, 1895

Species of spider

Dictyna ignobilis is spider species found in Moldavia and Armenia.
