= Nigma hortensis =

Scientific classification
- Kingdom: Animalia
- Phylum: Arthropoda
- Subphylum: Chelicerata
- Class: Arachnida
- Order: Araneae
- Infraorder: Araneomorphae
- Family: Dictynidae
- Genus: Nigma
- Species: N. hortensis

Binomial name
- Nigma hortensis (Simon, 1870)

Species of spider

Nigma hortensis is a spider species found in Portugal, Spain, France and Algeria.
