= Dictyna formidolosa =

Scientific classification
- Kingdom: Animalia
- Phylum: Arthropoda
- Subphylum: Chelicerata
- Class: Arachnida
- Order: Araneae
- Infraorder: Araneomorphae
- Family: Dictynidae
- Genus: Dictyna
- Species: D. formidolosa

Binomial name
- Dictyna formidolosa Gertsch & Ivie, 1936

Species of spider

Dictyna formidolosa is a species of mesh web weaver in the spider family Dictynidae. It is found in the United States and Canada.
