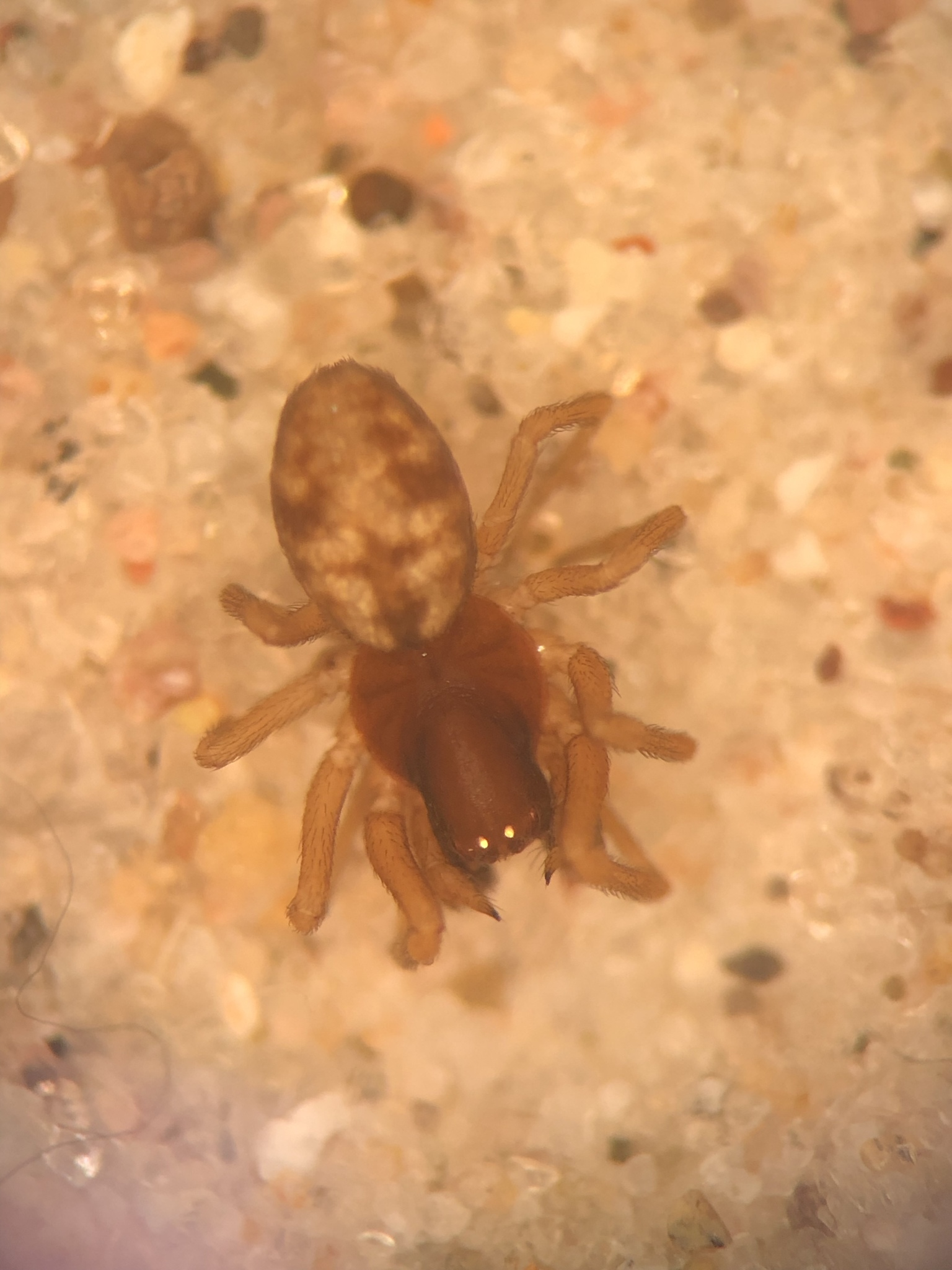
- T. bellans

Scientific classification
- Kingdom: Animalia
- Phylum: Arthropoda
- Subphylum: Chelicerata
- Class: Arachnida
- Order: Araneae
- Infraorder: Araneomorphae
- Family: Dictynidae
- Genus: Tolkienus; Cala-Riquelme, Crews & Esposito, 2025

Type species
- Dictyna longispina Emerton, 1888

Species
- 5, see text

= Tolkienus =

Genus of spiders

Tolkienus is a genus of spiders in the family Dictynidae.

== Distribution ==
Tolkienus is distributed across North America and Eurasia. In North America, the genus occurs in Canada and the US, with T. bellans extending into Mexico. In Eurasia, the genus is found from Eastern Europe to Iran. T. estoc is endemic to Equatorial Guinea in West Africa.

== Etymology ==
The genus is named in honor of J. R. R. Tolkien.

== Taxonomy ==
This genus was erected in 2025 with species formerly in genus Dictyna, and one newly described species from West Africa.

== Species ==
As of October 2025, this genus includes five species and one subspecies:

- Tolkienus armatus (Thorell, 1875) – Ukraine, Russia (Europe, Caucasus)
- Tolkienus bellans (Chamberlin, 1919) – United States, Mexico
  - T. b. hatchi (Jones, 1948) – United States
- Tolkienus estoc Cala-Riquelme & Al-Jamal, 2025 – Equatorial Guinea
- Tolkienus longispinus (Emerton, 1888) – Canada, United States (type species)
- Tolkienus ottoi (Marusik & Koponen, 2017) – Caucasus (Russia, Georgia, Azerbaijan), Iran
