= Dictyna coloradensis =

Conservation status
- Secure (NatureServe)

Scientific classification
- Kingdom: Animalia
- Phylum: Arthropoda
- Subphylum: Chelicerata
- Class: Arachnida
- Order: Araneae
- Infraorder: Araneomorphae
- Family: Dictynidae
- Genus: Dictyna
- Species: D. coloradensis

Binomial name
- Dictyna coloradensis Chamberlin, 1919

Species of spider

Dictyna coloradensis is a species of mesh web weaver in the family of spiders known as Dictynidae. It is found in the United States.
