= Dictyna turbida =

Scientific classification
- Kingdom: Animalia
- Phylum: Arthropoda
- Subphylum: Chelicerata
- Class: Arachnida
- Order: Araneae
- Infraorder: Araneomorphae
- Family: Dictynidae
- Genus: Dictyna
- Species: D. turbida

Binomial name
- Dictyna turbida Simon, 1905

Species of spider

Dictyna turbida is a species of spiders of the genus Dictyna. It is native to India and Sri Lanka.
