= Ajmonia smaragdula =

Scientific classification
- Kingdom: Animalia
- Phylum: Arthropoda
- Subphylum: Chelicerata
- Class: Arachnida
- Order: Araneae
- Infraorder: Araneomorphae
- Family: Dictynidae
- Genus: Ajmonia
- Species: A. smaragdula

Binomial name
- Ajmonia smaragdula (Simon, 1905)

Synonyms
- Dictynomorpha smaragdula Lehtinen, 1967

Species of spider

Ajmonia smaragdula is a species of spider of the genus Ajmonia. It is endemic to Sri Lanka.
