= Pangunus =

Scientific classification
- Kingdom: Animalia
- Phylum: Arthropoda
- Subphylum: Chelicerata
- Class: Arachnida
- Order: Araneae
- Infraorder: Araneomorphae
- Family: Dictynidae
- Genus: Pangunus; Cala-Riquelme, 2025

Type species
- Emblyna kaszabi Marusik & Koponen, 1998

Species
- 3, see text

Genus of spiders

Pangunus is a genus of spiders in the family Dictynidae.

== Distribution ==
Pangunus occurs across Asia, with species found in China, India, and Mongolia.

== Etymology ==
The genus name refers to 盤古; Pángǔ, a creation figure in Chinese mythology and in Taoism.

== Taxonomy ==
The species in this genus were transferred from Dictyna (P. umai, P. xizangensis) and Emblyna (P. kaszabi).

== Species ==
As of October 2025, this genus includes three species:

- Pangunus kaszabi (Marusik & Koponen, 1998) – Mongolia (type species)
- Pangunus umai (Tikader, 1966) – India
- Pangunus xizangensis (Hu & Li, 1987) – China
