= Arethyna =

Scientific classification
- Kingdom: Animalia
- Phylum: Arthropoda
- Subphylum: Chelicerata
- Class: Arachnida
- Order: Araneae
- Infraorder: Araneomorphae
- Family: Dictynidae
- Genus: Arethyna; Cala-Riquelme, 2025

Type species
- Dictyna volucripes Keyserling, 1881

Species
- 11, see text

Genus of spiders

Arethyna is a genus of spiders in the family Dictynidae.

== Distribution ==
Most species are endemic to North America from Canada to Mexico, with one species found in China and South Siberia.

== Etymology ==
The genus name honors singer Aretha Franklin, with the ending rhyming to the related genus Dictyna.

== Taxonomy ==
All species in this genus were transferred from genus Dyctina, except for A. osceola, which was transferred from Emblyna.

== Species ==
As of October 2025, this genus includes eleven species:

- Arethyna coloradensis (Chamberlin, 1919) – Canada, United States
- Arethyna idahoana (Chamberlin & Ivie, 1933) – United States
- Arethyna osceola (Chamberlin & Gertsch, 1958) – United States
- Arethyna peon (Chamberlin & Gertsch, 1958) – United States, Mexico
- Arethyna personata (Gertsch & Mulaik, 1936) – Canada, United States, Mexico
- Arethyna saltona (Chamberlin & Gertsch, 1958) – United States
- Arethyna secuta (Chamberlin, 1924) – United States, Mexico
- Arethyna sierra (Chamberlin, 1948) – United States, Mexico
- Arethyna ubsunurica (Marusik & Koponen, 1998) – Russia (South Siberia), China
- Arethyna volucripes (Keyserling, 1881) – Canada, United States, Mexico (type species)
  - A. v. volucripoides (Ivie, 1947) – United States
