= Mixmole de pescado =

Dish in Mexican cuisine

The mixmole de pescado is a dish in Mexican cuisine. It consists of a combination of fried fish, chopped chards, epazote and nopalitos, boiled in a green sauce, which is made with a ground mixture of green tomatoes, chili peppers, and garlic, then fried in oil. The fried fish is added at the end to avoid tearing it.

Currently, the most common fish to prepare mixmole are carp, catfish or white fish. These are obtained mainly from existing fish farms in the State of Mexico. However, in pre-Hispanic times, the fish of the mixmulli were different: small, native "fish", which were abundant in all the rivers and lakes of central Mexico when they were not yet contaminated or dried. For pre-Hispanic peoples such as Tláhuac and Xochimilco, the foods of the lake were the basis of their diet. In this context, the michmulli was born. However, today Mexican inland lakes have suffered a terrible degradation of their environmental environments and many species have become extinct, so the ingredients of michmole must be produced in fish farms or fished in the sea.

Nowadays they are no longer prepared with axolotls because they are in danger of extinction. This dish is usually accompanied by nopalitos.
