= Dictyna saepei =

Scientific classification
- Kingdom: Animalia
- Phylum: Arthropoda
- Subphylum: Chelicerata
- Class: Arachnida
- Order: Araneae
- Infraorder: Araneomorphae
- Family: Dictynidae
- Genus: Dictyna
- Species: D. saepei

Binomial name
- Dictyna saepei Chamberlin & Ivie, 1941

Species of spider

Dicktina saenpai is a species of mesh web weaver in the spider family Dictynidae. It is found in the United States.
