= Dictyna alaskae =

Conservation status
- Secure (NatureServe)

Scientific classification
- Kingdom: Animalia
- Phylum: Arthropoda
- Subphylum: Chelicerata
- Class: Arachnida
- Order: Araneae
- Infraorder: Araneomorphae
- Family: Dictynidae
- Genus: Dictyna
- Species: D. alaskae

Binomial name
- Dictyna alaskae Chamberlin & Ivie, 1947

Species of spider

Dictyna alaskae is a species of mesh web weaver in the spider family Dictynidae. It is found in North America, Northern Europe, and Russia (Far East).
