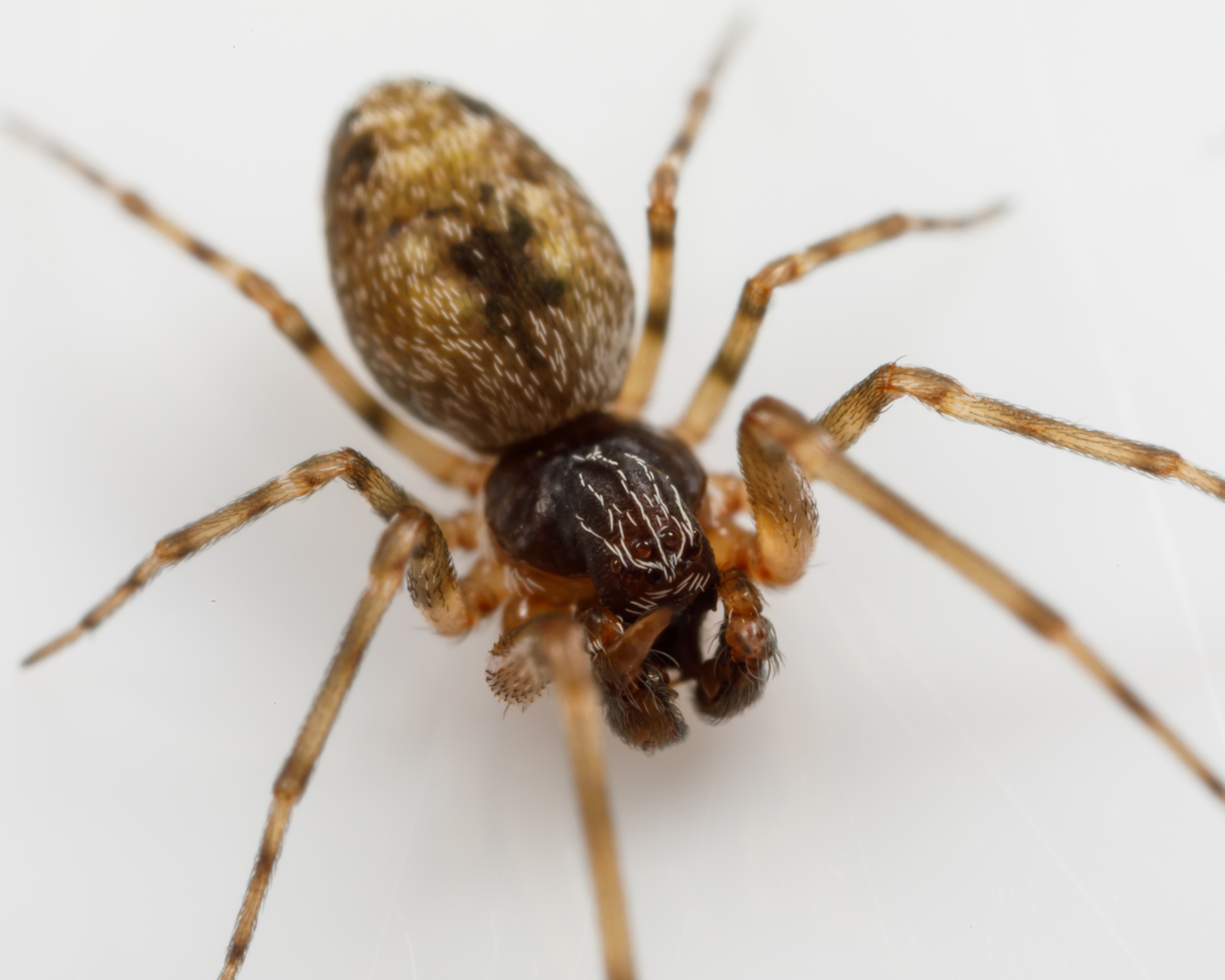

Scientific classification
- Domain: Eukaryota
- Kingdom: Animalia
- Phylum: Arthropoda
- Subphylum: Chelicerata
- Class: Arachnida
- Order: Araneae
- Infraorder: Araneomorphae
- Family: Dictynidae
- Genus: Dictyna
- Species: D. calcarata

Binomial name
- Dictyna calcarata Banks, 1904

= Dictyna calcarata =

Species of spider

Dictyna calcarata is a species of mesh web weaver in the spider family Dictynidae. It is found in the United States, Mexico, and has been introduced into Hawaii.
