= Purplecorna =

Scientific classification
- Kingdom: Animalia
- Phylum: Arthropoda
- Subphylum: Chelicerata
- Class: Arachnida
- Order: Araneae
- Infraorder: Araneomorphae
- Family: Dictynidae
- Genus: Purplecorna; Cala-Riquelme & Esposito, 2025

Type species
- Dictyna incredula Gertsch & Davis, 1937

Species
- 7, see text

Genus of spiders

Purplecorna is a genus of spiders in the family Dictynidae.

== Distribution ==
Most species are found from Canada to Mexico, with one endemic to Panama, and another reaching into the Caribbean.

== Etymology ==
The genus name refers to purple corn, a variety of corn originating in South America.

== Taxonomy ==
All species transferred to this genus were formerly placed in Dictyna.

== Species ==
As of October 2025, this genus includes seven species:

- Purplecorna gloria (Chamberlin & Ivie, 1944) – United States
- Purplecorna guerrerensis (Gertsch & Davis, 1937) – Mexico
- Purplecorna incredula (Gertsch & Davis, 1937) – Mexico (type species)
- Purplecorna lecta (Chickering, 1952) – Panama
- Purplecorna meditata (Gertsch, 1936) – Mexico to Panama, Jamaica, Cuba, Bonaire
- Purplecorna miniata (Banks, 1898) – Mexico
- Purplecorna terrestris (Emerton, 1911) – Canada, United States
