= Eriena =

Scientific classification
- Kingdom: Animalia
- Phylum: Arthropoda
- Subphylum: Chelicerata
- Class: Arachnida
- Order: Araneae
- Infraorder: Araneomorphae
- Family: Dictynidae
- Genus: Eriena; Cala-Riquelme, Crews & Esposito, 2025

Type species
- Dictyna minuta Emerton, 1888

Species
- 2, see text

Genus of spiders

Eriena is a genus of spiders in the family Dictynidae.

== Distribution ==
Eriena is found in North America.

== Etymology ==
The genus name refers to the Erie people, who historically lived on the southern shore of Lake Erie.

== Taxonomy ==
Both species were transferred from genus Dictyna.

== Species ==
As of October 2025, this genus includes two species:

- Eriena minuta (Emerton, 1888) – Canada, United States (type species)
- Eriena mora (Chamberlin & Gertsch, 1958) – United States
