= Dictynomorpha =

Scientific classification
- Domain: Eukaryota
- Kingdom: Animalia
- Phylum: Arthropoda
- Subphylum: Chelicerata
- Class: Arachnida
- Order: Araneae
- Infraorder: Araneomorphae
- Family: Dictynidae
- Genus: Dictynomorpha; Spassky, 1939

Type species
- D. strandi Spassky, 1939

Species
- D. daemonis Marusik, Esyunin & Tuneva, 2015 – Kazakhstan; D. strandi Spassky, 1939 – Kazakhstan, Uzbekistan, Turkmenistan, Kyrgyzstan

Genus of spiders

Dictynomorpha is a genus of Asian cribellate araneomorph spiders in the family Dictynidae, and was first described by S. A. Spassky in 1939. As of May 2019 it contains only two species: D. daemonis and D. strandi.
