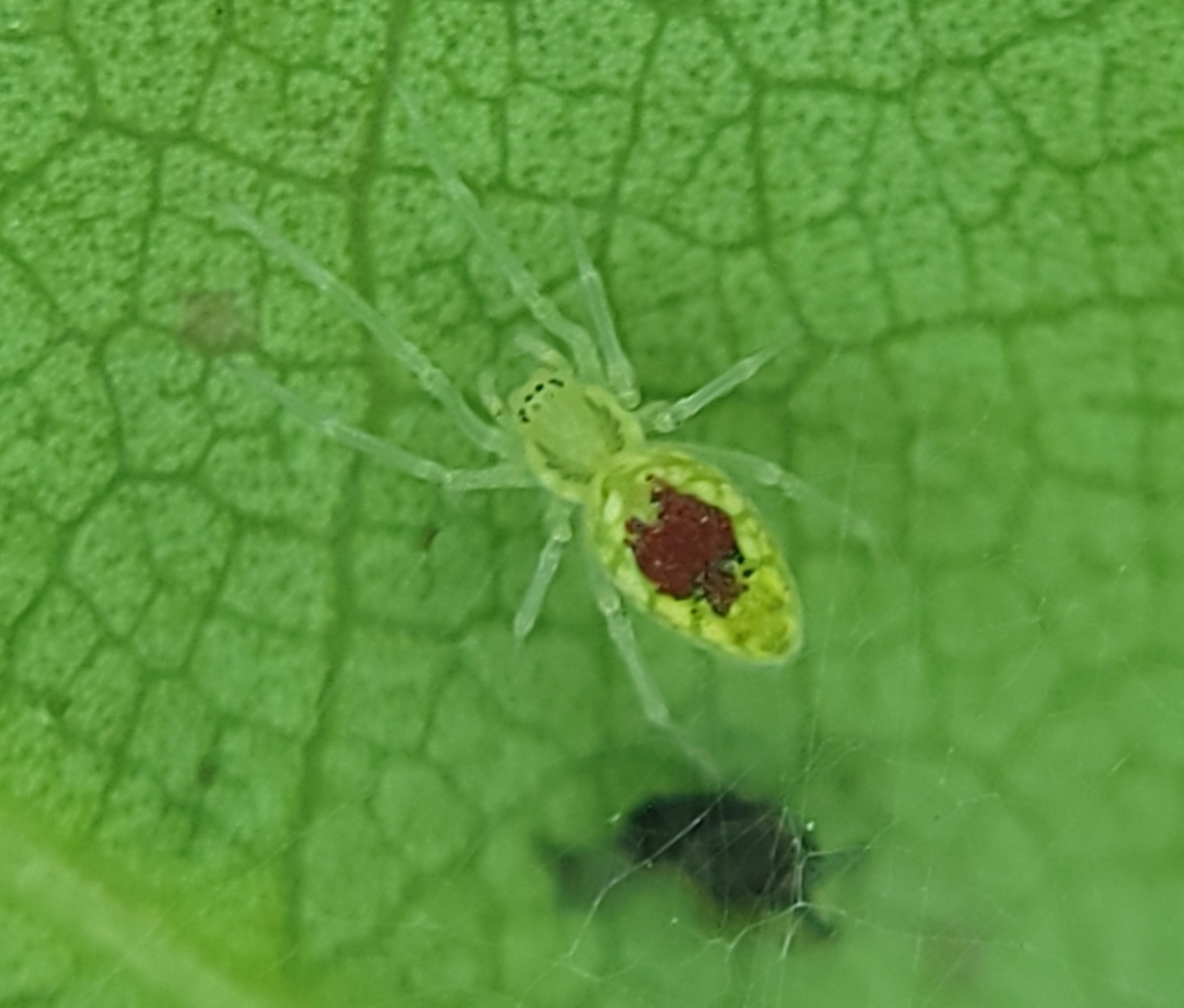
- female
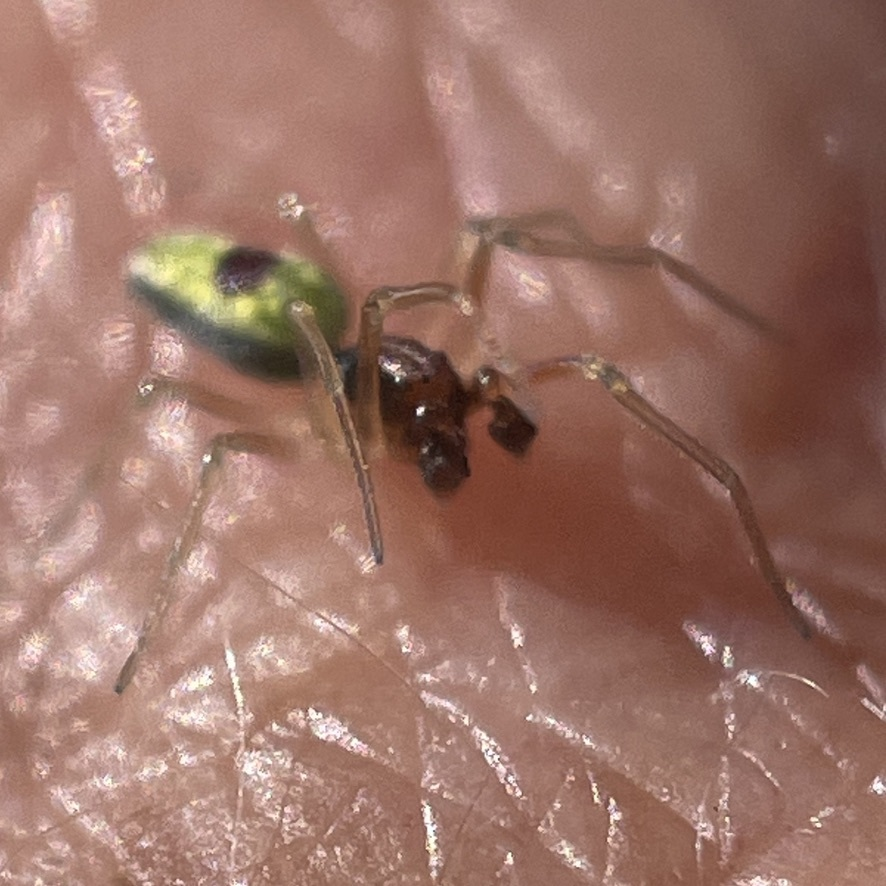
- male

Scientific classification
- Kingdom: Animalia
- Phylum: Arthropoda
- Subphylum: Chelicerata
- Class: Arachnida
- Order: Araneae
- Infraorder: Araneomorphae
- Family: Dictynidae
- Genus: Califorenigma; Cala-Riquelme, Gorneau & Esposito, 2025
- Species: C. linsdalei

Binomial name
- Califorenigma linsdalei (Chamberlin & Gertsch, 1958)

Synonyms
- Heterodictyna linsdalei Chamberlin & Gertsch, 1958; Nigma linsdalei Brignoli, 1983

= Califorenigma =

Species of spider

Califorenigma is a monotypic genus of spiders in the family Dictynidae containing the single species, Califorenigma linsdalei.

== Distribution ==
Califorenigma linsdalei is endemic to California.

== Etymology ==
The genus name is a word play, with the first part indicating the type locality, the end referring to genus Nigma, where the species resided before, and "enigma", highlighting the enigmatic features of this species.
