= Helenactyna =

Scientific classification
- Kingdom: Animalia
- Phylum: Arthropoda
- Subphylum: Chelicerata
- Class: Arachnida
- Order: Araneae
- Infraorder: Araneomorphae
- Family: Dictynidae
- Genus: Helenactyna; Benoit, 1977

Type species
- H. crucifera (O. Pickard-Cambridge, 1873)

Species
- H. crucifera (O. Pickard-Cambridge, 1873) – St. Helena; H. vicina Benoit, 1977 – St. Helena

Genus of spiders

Helenactyna is a genus of cribellate araneomorph spiders in the family Dictynidae, and was first described by Pierre L.G. Benoit in 1977. As of May 2019 it contains only two species, both from Saint Helena: H. crucifera and H. vicina.
