= Thallumetus =

- Thallumetus pineus

Scientific classification
- Kingdom: Animalia
- Phylum: Arthropoda
- Subphylum: Chelicerata
- Class: Arachnida
- Order: Araneae
- Infraorder: Araneomorphae
- Family: Dictynidae
- Genus: Thallumetus; Simon, 1893

Type species
- T. salax Simon, 1893

Species
- 10, see text

Genus of spiders

Thallumetus is a genus of cribellate araneomorph spiders in the family Dictynidae, and was first described by Eugène Simon in 1893.

== Species ==
As of September 2026 it contains 11 species:

- Thallumetus acanthochirus Simon, 1904 – Chile
- Thallumetus ascensionensis Sherwood, Marusik, Peñaherrera-R., Calderón-C. & Sharp, 2024 – Ascension Is.
- Thallumetus dulcineus Gertsch, 1946 – Panama
- Thallumetus latifemur (Soares & Camargo, 1948) – Brazil
- Thallumetus octomaculellus (Gertsch & Davis, 1937) – Mexico
- Thallumetus parvulus Bryant, 1942 – Virgin Is.
- Thallumetus pineus (Chamberlin & Ivie, 1944) – USA
- Thallumetus pullus Chickering, 1952 – Panama
- Thallumetus pusillus Chickering, 1950 – Panama
- Thallumetus salax Simon, 1893 (type) – Venezuela
- Thallumetus simoni Gertsch, 1945 – Guyana
