= Marilynia =

Scientific classification
- Kingdom: Animalia
- Phylum: Arthropoda
- Subphylum: Chelicerata
- Class: Arachnida
- Order: Araneae
- Infraorder: Araneomorphae
- Family: Dictynidae
- Genus: Marilynia; Lehtinen, 1967

Type species
- M. bicolor (Simon, 1870)

Species
- 1, see text

Genus of spiders

Marilynia is a genus of cribellate araneomorph spiders in the family Dictynidae, and was first described by Pekka T. Lehtinen in 1967.

== Species ==
As of January 2026, this genus includes one species and one subspecies:

- Marilynia bicolor (Simon, 1870) – Europe to Central Asia, North Africa
  - M. b. littoralis (Denis, 1959) – France
