= Callevophthalmus =

Scientific classification
- Kingdom: Animalia
- Phylum: Arthropoda
- Subphylum: Chelicerata
- Class: Arachnida
- Order: Araneae
- Infraorder: Araneomorphae
- Family: Dictynidae
- Genus: Callevophthalmus; Simon, 1906

Type species
- C. albus (Keyserling, 1890)

Species
- C. albus (Keyserling, 1890) – Australia (mainland, Lord Howe Is.); C. maculatus (Keyserling, 1890) – Australia (New South Wales)

Genus of spiders

Callevophthalmus is a genus of Australian cribellate araneomorph spiders in the family Dictynidae, and was first described by Eugène Simon in 1906. As of May 2019 it contains only two species: C. albus and C. maculatus. Originally placed in the Amaurobiidae, it was moved to the Dictynidae in 1967.
