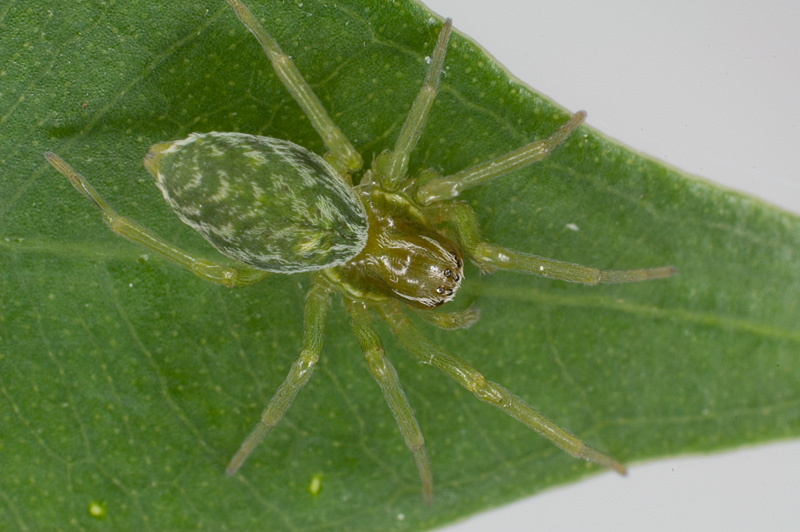
- N. walckenaeri
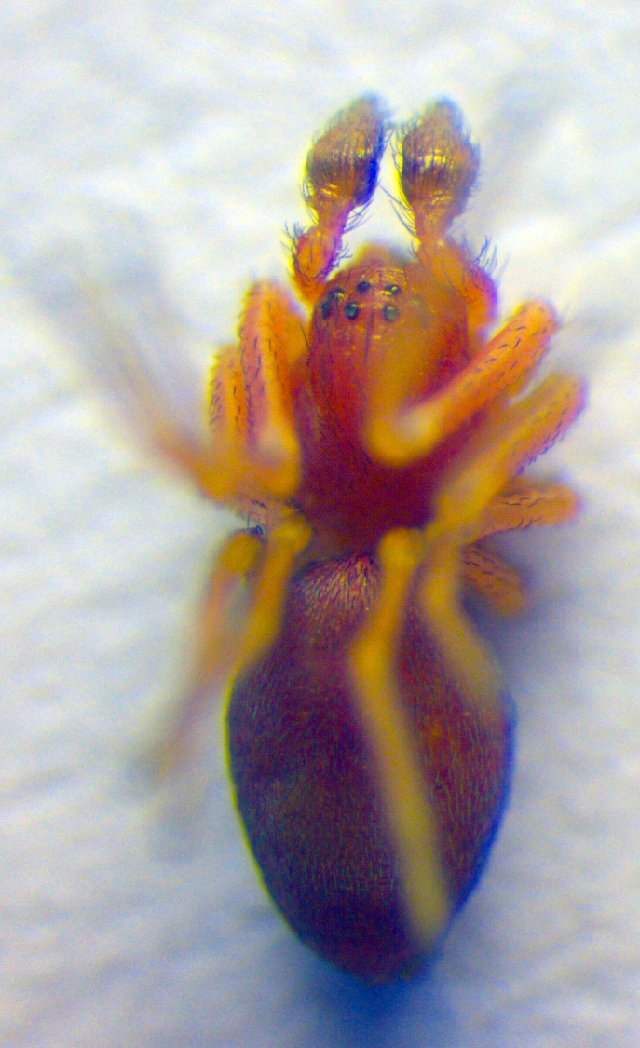
- N. flavescens

Scientific classification
- Kingdom: Animalia
- Phylum: Arthropoda
- Subphylum: Chelicerata
- Class: Arachnida
- Order: Araneae
- Infraorder: Araneomorphae
- Family: Dictynidae
- Genus: Nigma; Lehtinen, 1967

Type species
- N. flavescens (Walckenaer, 1830)

Species
- 14, see text

= Nigma =

Genus of spiders

Nigma is a genus of cribellate araneomorph spiders in the family Dictynidae, and was first described by Pekka T. Lehtinen in 1967. They have a wide distribution, including Eurasia, North America, and Northern Africa. N. walckenaeri is one of the biggest members of the Dictynidae, growing up to 5 millimetres (0.20 in) long. They are translucent green and sometimes have red or black markings on the abdomen.

== Species ==
As of May 2019 it contains fourteen species:

- Nigma conducens (O. Pickard-Cambridge, 1876) – North Africa
- Nigma flavescens (Walckenaer, 1830) (type) – Europe, Caucasus, Iran
- Nigma gertschi (Berland & Millot, 1940) – Senegal
- Nigma gratiosa (Simon, 1881) – Portugal, Spain, North Africa
- Nigma hortensis (Simon, 1870) – Portugal, Spain, France, Algeria
- Nigma laeta (Spassky, 1952) – Azerbaijan, Iran, Tajikistan
- Nigma linsdalei (Chamberlin & Gertsch, 1958) – United States
- Nigma longipes (Berland, 1914) – East Africa
- Nigma nangquianensis (Hu, 2001) – China
- Nigma puella (Simon, 1870) – Europe, Azores, Madeira, Canary Is.
- Nigma shiprai (Tikader, 1966) – India
- Nigma tuberosa Wunderlich, 1987 – Canary Is.
- Nigma vulnerata (Simon, 1914) – Mediterranean
- Nigma walckenaeri (Roewer, 1951) – Europe, Turkey, Caucasus
