= Ajmonia =

Scientific classification
- Kingdom: Animalia
- Phylum: Arthropoda
- Subphylum: Chelicerata
- Class: Arachnida
- Order: Araneae
- Infraorder: Araneomorphae
- Family: Dictynidae
- Genus: Ajmonia; Caporiacco, 1934

Type species
- A. velifera (Simon, 1906)

Species
- 12, see text

Genus of spiders

Ajmonia is a genus of cribellate araneomorph spiders in the family Dictynidae, and was first described by Lodovico di Caporiacco in 1934.

== Species ==
As of May 2019 it contains twelve species restricted to Asia and parts of Algeria:

- Ajmonia aurita Song & Lu, 1985 – Kazakhstan, China
- Ajmonia bedeshai (Tikader, 1966) – India (mainland, Andaman Is.)
- Ajmonia capucina (Schenkel, 1936) – China
- Ajmonia lehtineni Marusik & Koponen, 1998 – Mongolia
- Ajmonia marakata (Sherriffs, 1927) – India
- Ajmonia numidica (Denis, 1937) – Algeria
- Ajmonia patellaris (Simon, 1911) – Algeria
- Ajmonia procera (Kulczyński, 1901) – China
- Ajmonia psittacea (Schenkel, 1936) – China
- Ajmonia rajaeii Zamani & Marusik, 2017 – Iran
- Ajmonia smaragdula (Simon, 1905) – Sri Lanka
- Ajmonia velifera (Simon, 1906) (type) – India to China
