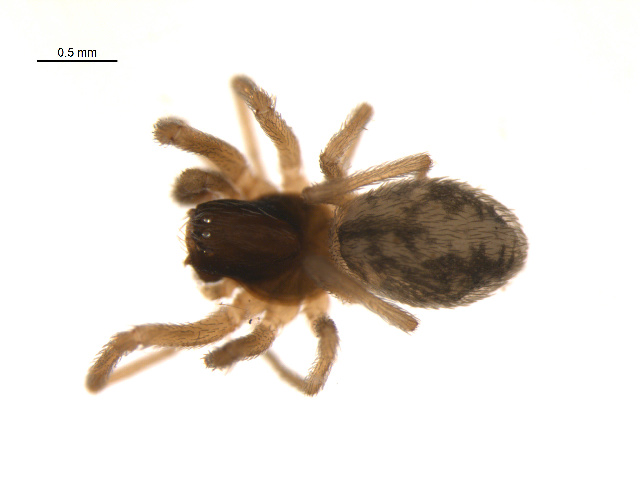
- Phantyna terranea
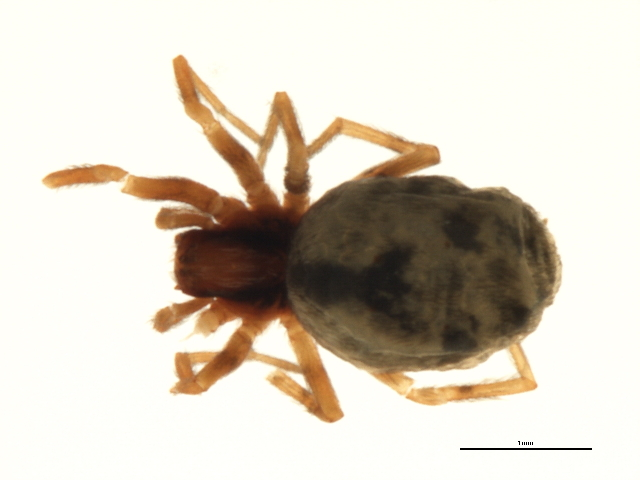
- Phantyna bicornis, adult female

Scientific classification
- Kingdom: Animalia
- Phylum: Arthropoda
- Subphylum: Chelicerata
- Class: Arachnida
- Order: Araneae
- Infraorder: Araneomorphae
- Family: Dictynidae
- Genus: Phantyna; Chamberlin, 1948

Type species
- P. micro (Chamberlin & Ivie, 1944)

Species
- 14, see text

= Phantyna =

Genus of spiders

Phantyna is a genus of cribellate araneomorph spiders in the family Dictynidae, and was first described by R. V. Chamberlin in 1948.

== Species ==
As of May 2019 it contains fourteen species:

- Phantyna bicornis (Emerton, 1915) – USA, Canada
- Phantyna estebanensis (Simon, 1906) – Venezuela
- Phantyna mandibularis (Taczanowski, 1874) – Mexico to Brazil
- Phantyna meridensis (Caporiacco, 1955) – Venezuela
- Phantyna micro (Chamberlin & Ivie, 1944) (type) – USA
- Phantyna mulegensis (Chamberlin, 1924) – USA, Mexico
- Phantyna pixi (Chamberlin & Gertsch, 1958) – USA
- Phantyna provida (Gertsch & Mulaik, 1936) – USA
- Phantyna remota (Banks, 1924) – Ecuador (Galapagos Is.)
- Phantyna rita (Gertsch, 1946) – USA
- Phantyna segregata (Gertsch & Mulaik, 1936) – USA, Mexico
- Phantyna terranea (Ivie, 1947) – USA
- Phantyna varyna (Chamberlin & Gertsch, 1958) – USA, Mexico
  - Phantyna v. miranda (Chamberlin & Gertsch, 1958) – USA
