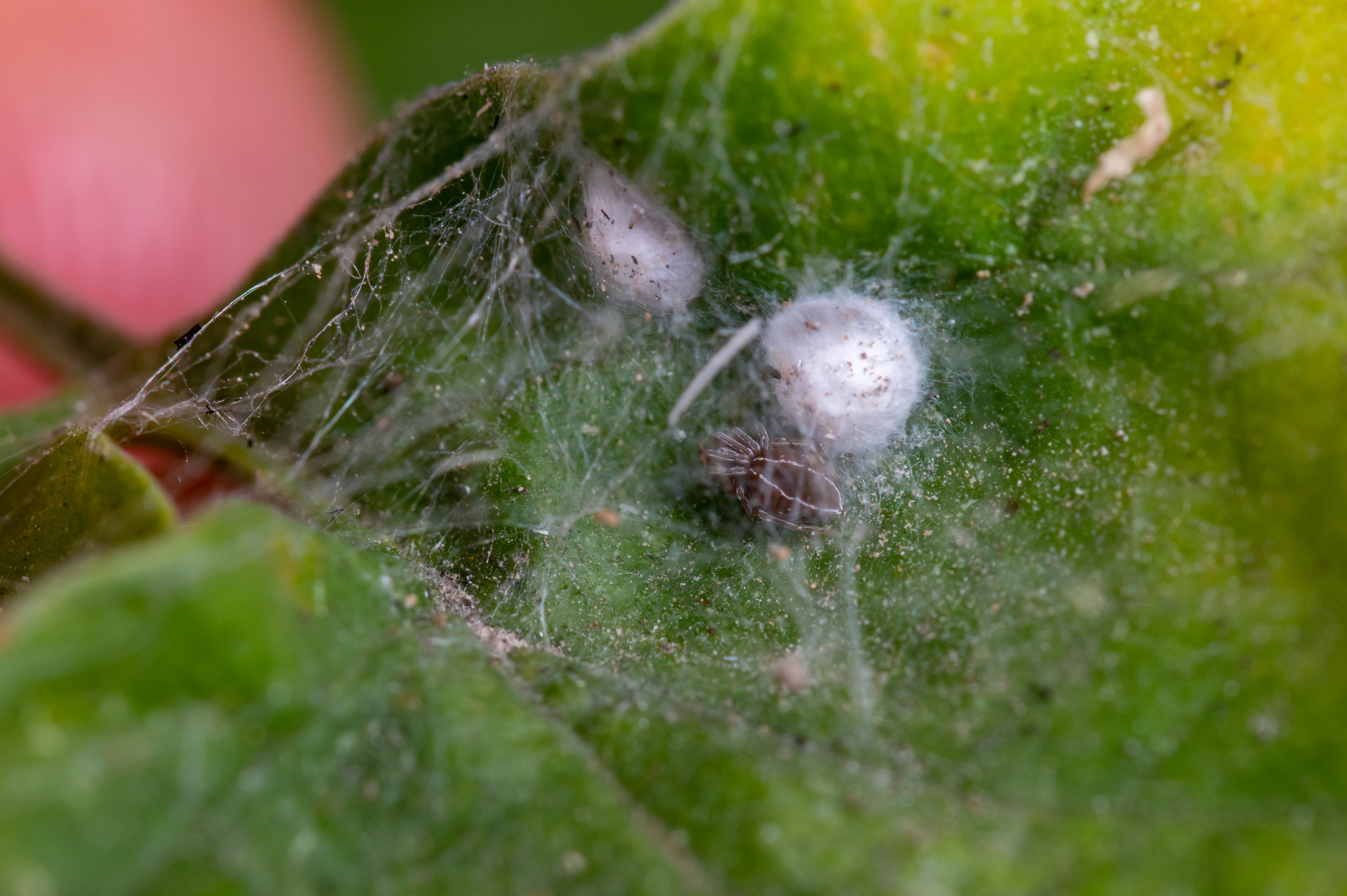
- An unknown species of Sudesna located in Thailand

Scientific classification
- Kingdom: Animalia
- Phylum: Arthropoda
- Subphylum: Chelicerata
- Class: Arachnida
- Order: Araneae
- Infraorder: Araneomorphae
- Family: Dictynidae
- Genus: Sudesna; Lehtinen, 1967

Type species
- Dictyna hedini Schenkel, 1936

Species
- 17, see text

= Sudesna =

Genus of spiders

Sudesna is a genus of cribellate araneomorph spiders that belongs to the family Dictynidae.

== Distribution ==
Members of this genus are found distributed Australia, Southern, Southeast and east Asia. The majority of these species, around nine, have been found to be exclusively inhabiting China. Despite the Xizang province of China being a hotspot for biodiversity including spiders, the only species from this genus is Sudesna flavipes.

== Taxonomy ==
This genus was first described by Pekka T. Lehtinen in 1967 with the type species being Sudensa hedini.

=== Species ===
As of April 2026, this genus currently contains 17 described species. A list of them can be found below:

- Sudesna anaulax (Simon, 1908) – Australia (Western Australia)
- Sudesna cangshan Wang, Peng & Zhang, 2025 – China
- Sudesna circularis Zhang & Li, 2011 – China
- Sudesna chayu Lu-Yu Wang, Zhi-Sheng Zhang, Yong-Qiang Xu, 2026 - China
- Sudesna dali Wang, Peng & Zhang, 2025 – China
- Sudesna digitata Zhang & Li, 2011 – China
- Sudesna flavipes (Hu, 2001) – China
- Sudesna grammica (Simon, 1893) – Philippines
- Sudesna grossa (Simon, 1906) – India
- Sudesna haiboi Wang, Peng & Zhang, 2025 – China
- Sudesna hainan Wang, Peng & Zhang, 2025 – China (Hainan)
- Sudesna hedini (Schenkel, 1936) (type species) – China, Korea
- Sudesna mii Lu-Yu Wang, Zhi-Sheng Zhang, Yong-Qiang Xu, 2026 - China
- Sudesna medog Lu-Yu Wang, Zhi-Sheng Zhang, Yong-Qiang Xu, 2026 - China
- Sudesna shangrila Wang, Peng & Zhang, 2025 – China
- Sudesna wangi Lu-Yu Wang, Zhi-Sheng Zhang, Yong-Qiang Xu, 2026 - China
- Sudesna yangi Wang, Peng & Zhang, 2025 – China
