= Mexitlia =

Scientific classification
- Domain: Eukaryota
- Kingdom: Animalia
- Phylum: Arthropoda
- Subphylum: Chelicerata
- Class: Arachnida
- Order: Araneae
- Infraorder: Araneomorphae
- Family: Dictynidae
- Genus: Mexitlia; Lehtinen, 1967

Type species
- M. trivittata (Banks, 1901)

Species
- M. altima Bond & Opell, 1997 – Mexico; M. grandis (O. Pickard-Cambridge, 1896) – Mexico; M. trivittata (Banks, 1901) – USA, Mexico

Genus of spiders

Mexitlia is a genus of North American cribellate araneomorph spiders in the family Dictynidae, and was first described by Pekka T. Lehtinen in 1967. As of May 2019 it contains only three species: M. altima, M. grandis, and M. trivittata.
