= Nopal =

Young stem segment of the Opuntia cactus

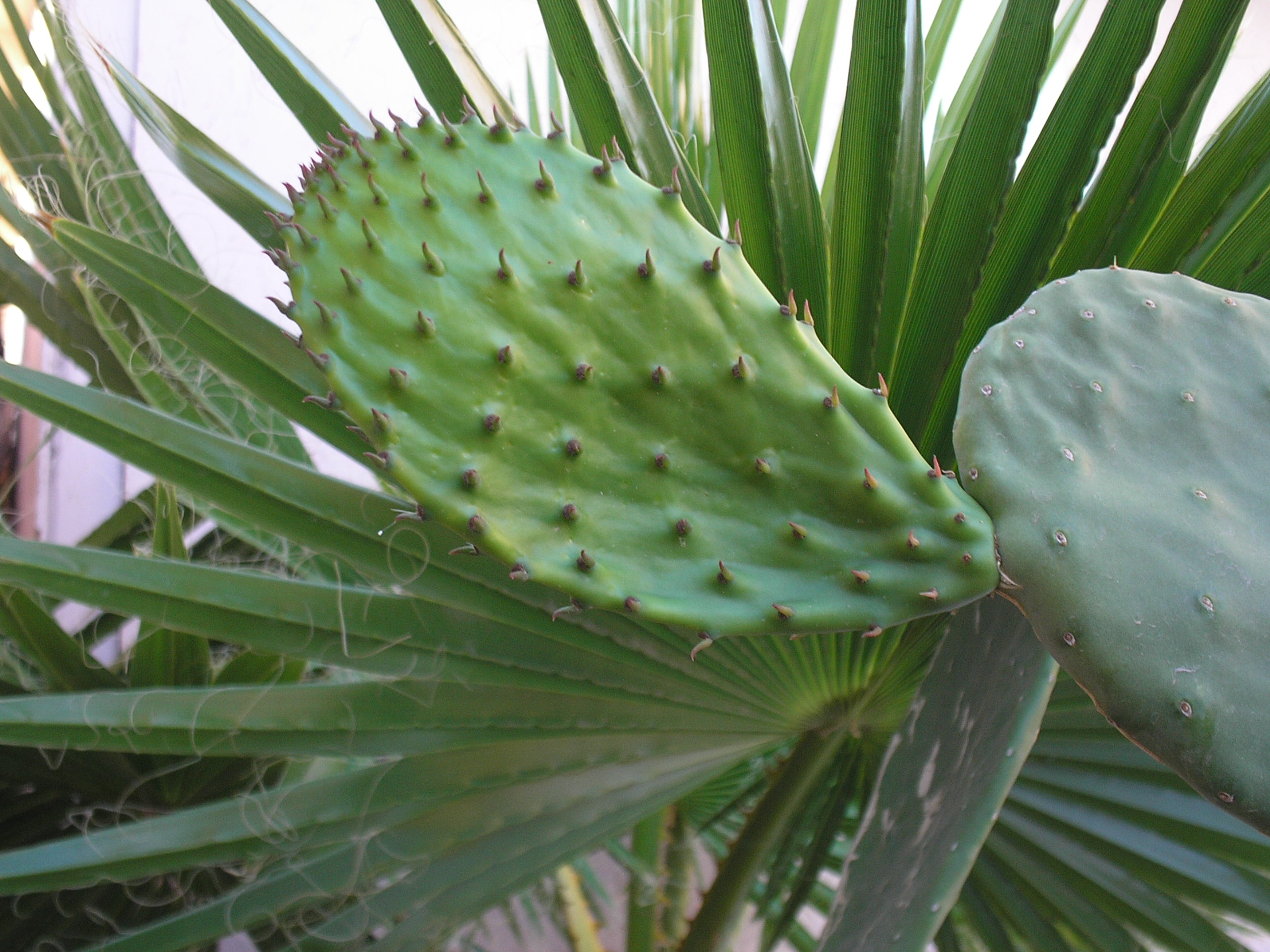
Mature edible nopal pad

Nopal (Note: English: /noʊˈpɑːl/ noh-PAHL, /-ˈpæl/ -PAL, also /ˈnoʊpəl/ NOH-pəl, Spanish: [noˈpal] pl.: nopales, English: /noʊˈpɑːleɪs/ noh-PAHL-ayss, /-ˈpæl-/ -PAL-, Spanish: [noˈpales]; also nopals /ˈnoʊpəlz/ NOH-pəlz) is a common name in Spanish for Opuntia cacti (commonly referred to in English as prickly pear or tender cactus), as well as for its pads. The name nopal derives from the Nahuatl word nohpalli (Note: pronounced [noʔˈpalːi]) for the pads of the plant.

Nopal fruits can be eaten raw or cooked, having numerous uses particularly in Mexican cuisine.

== Description ==
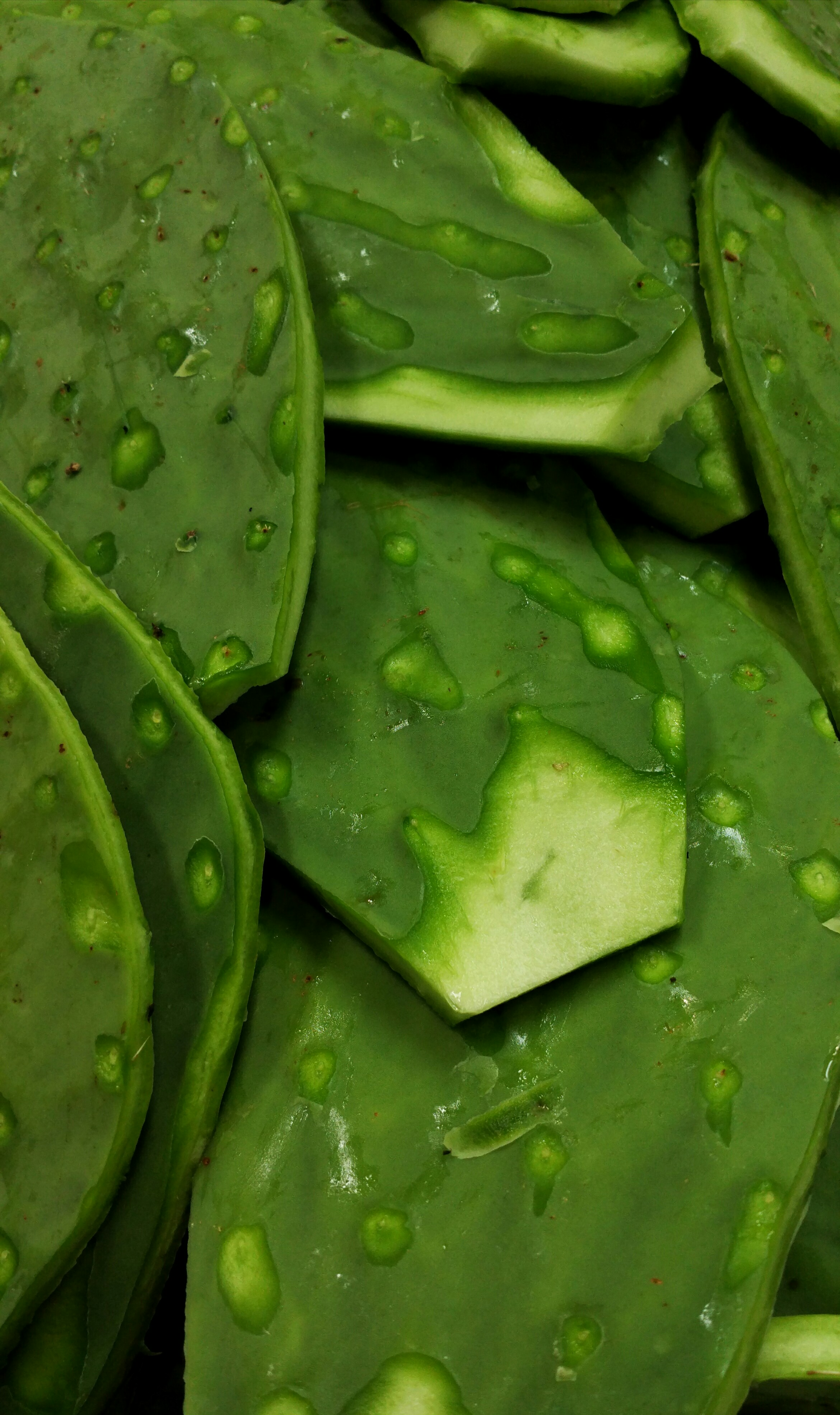
Fresh nopal for sale at a market

There are about 114 known species in Mexico, where it is a common ingredient in numerous Mexican cuisine dishes. The nopal pads can be eaten raw or cooked, used in marmalades, soups, stews and salads, as well as being used for traditional medicine or as fodder for animals. Farmed nopales are most often of the species Opuntia ficus-indica or Opuntia matudae although the pads of almost all Opuntia species are edible. The other edible part of the nopal cactus is the fruit, called tuna in Spanish and "prickly pear" in English.

== Culinary use ==
Nopales are generally sold fresh in Mexico, cleaned of spines, and sliced to the customer's wishes on the spot. They can also be found canned or bottled as nopalitos, and less often dried, especially for export. Cut into slices or diced into cubes, nopales have a light, slightly tart flavor, like green beans, and a crisp, mucilaginous texture. In most recipes, the mucilaginous liquid they contain is included in the cooking. They are at their most tender and juicy in the spring.

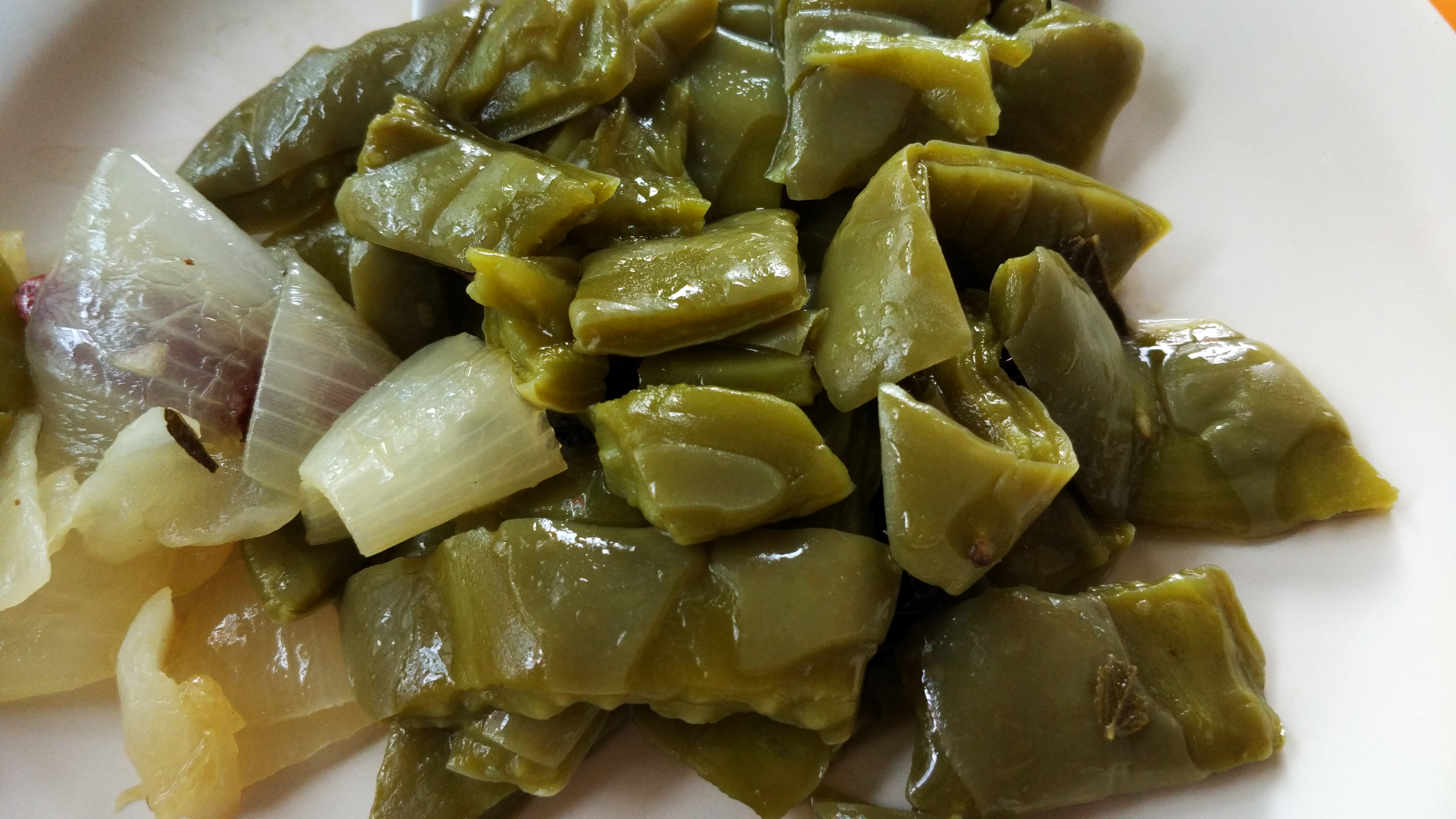
A nopal salad

Nopales are most commonly used in Mexican cuisine in dishes such as huevos con nopales "eggs with nopal", carne con nopales "meat with nopal", tacos de nopales, in salads with tomato, onion, and queso panela (panela cheese), or simply on their own as a side vegetable. Nopales have also grown to be an important ingredient in New Mexican cuisine and in Tejano culture of Texas.

Raw nopal fruit
Nutritional value per 100 g (3.5 oz)
- Energy: 16 kcal (67 kJ)
- Carbohydrates: 3.3 g
- Sugars: 1.2 g
- Dietary fiber: 2.2 g
- Fat: 0.1 g
- Protein: 1.3 g
Vitamins and minerals
Vitamins	Quantity %DV^{†}
Vitamin A equiv.	3% 23 μg
Thiamine (B1)	1% 0.012 mg
Riboflavin (B2)	3% 0.04 mg
Niacin (B3)	3% 0.41 mg
Pantothenic acid (B5)	3% 0.167 mg
Vitamin B6	4% 0.07 mg
Folate (B9)	1% 3 μg
Vitamin C	10% 9 mg
Vitamin E	0% 0 mg
Vitamin K	4% 5.3 μg
Minerals	Quantity %DV^{†}
Calcium	13% 164 mg
Iron	3% 0.6 mg
Magnesium	12% 52 mg
Manganese	20% 0.457 mg
Phosphorus	1% 16 mg
Potassium	9% 257 mg
Sodium	1% 21 mg
Zinc	2% 0.25 mg
- Other constituents: Quantity
- Water: 94 g
- Link to USDA Database entry
- ^{†}Percentages estimated using US recommendations for adults, except for potassium, which is estimated based on expert recommendation from the National Academies.

== Nutrition ==
Raw nopal fruit is 94% water, 3% carbohydrates, 1% protein, and contains negligible fat (table). In a reference amount of 100 g (3.5 oz), the fruit supplies 67 calories of food energy, and is a rich source (20% or more of the Daily Value, DV) of manganese, while containing moderate amounts (10-13%) of vitamin C, calcium, and magnesium (table).

A 2011 study found that its carbohydrate, fiber, and calcium contents increase as the plant matures, each becoming highest at 135 days. The calcium may not be biologically available, however, because it is present as calcium oxalate, a non-absorbable complex in the small intestine.

== Economic value ==
The nopal cactus grows extensively throughout Mexico, being especially abundant in the central Mexican arid and semi arid regions. In Mexico there are over 3,000,000 hectares (7,400,000 acres) of land used to cultivate nopal. There are three typical ways to cultivate nopal cacti — commercial plantations, family farms and gardens, or in the wild. Approximately 57,000 hectares (140,000 acres) are used to produce prickly pear fruit, 10,500 hectares (26,000 acres) for the pads production, and 100 hectares (250 acres) to cochineal production. In 1996 there were 10,300 hectares (25,000 acres) prickly pear farmers, as well as around 8000 general nopal farmers, with all of the people involved in the processing industries and in cochineal production, employing a significant number of the Mexican population. Nopal is grown in eighteen of the Mexican states with 74% in the Mexico City metropolitan area, with an annual yield of 58,000 tons of both the tuna and the pads. The farming of nopal provides many subsistence communities with employment, food, income, and allows them to remain on their land.

Detection of the cactus-eating moth Cactoblastis cactorum in Mexico in 2006 caused anxiety among the country's phytosanitary authorities, as this insect can be potentially devastating for the cactus industry. In 1925, the same insect was successfully used in Australia to control the quickly growing population of cactus, which had become an invasive species after its introduction.

== Gallery ==
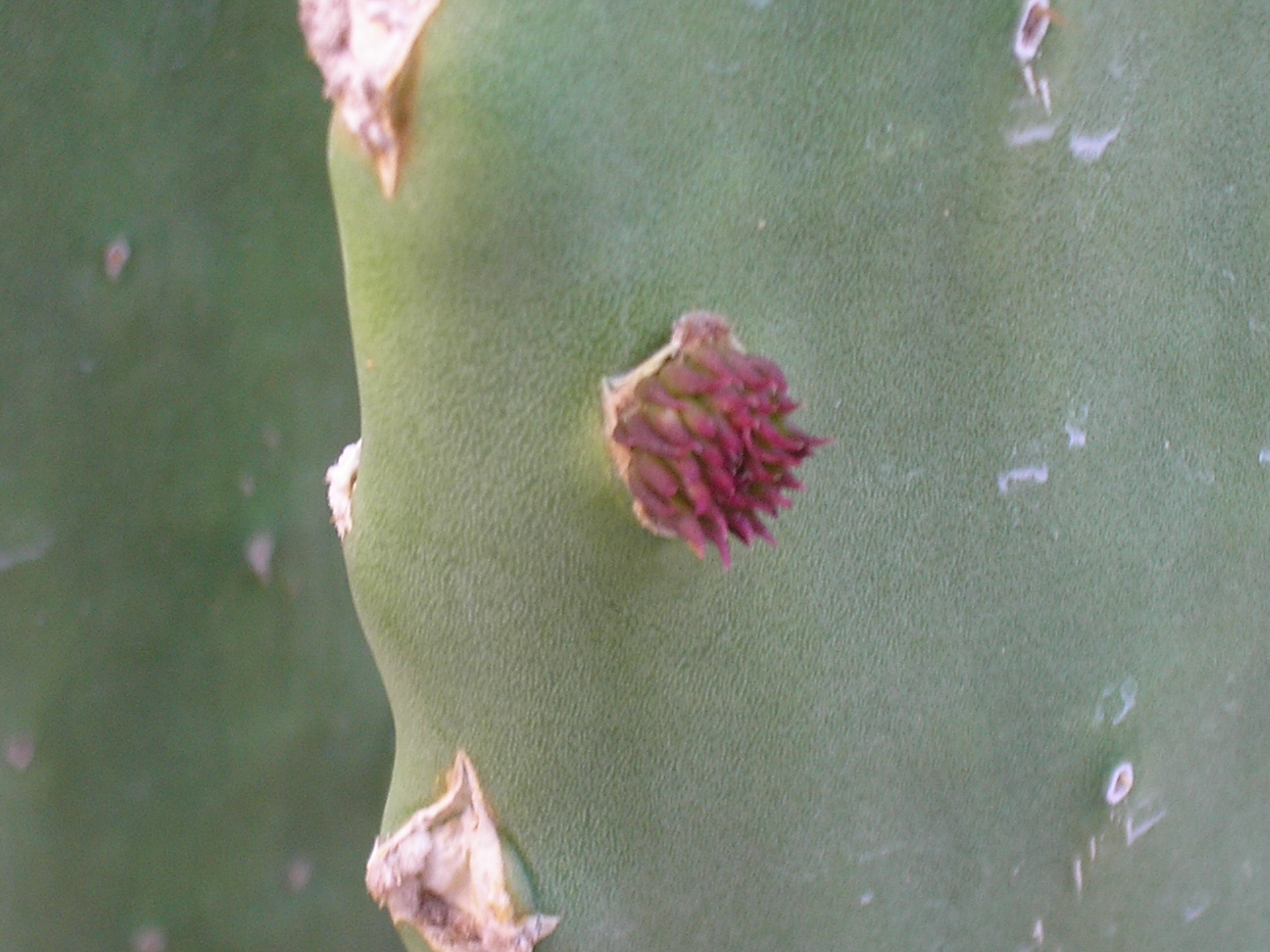
Budding

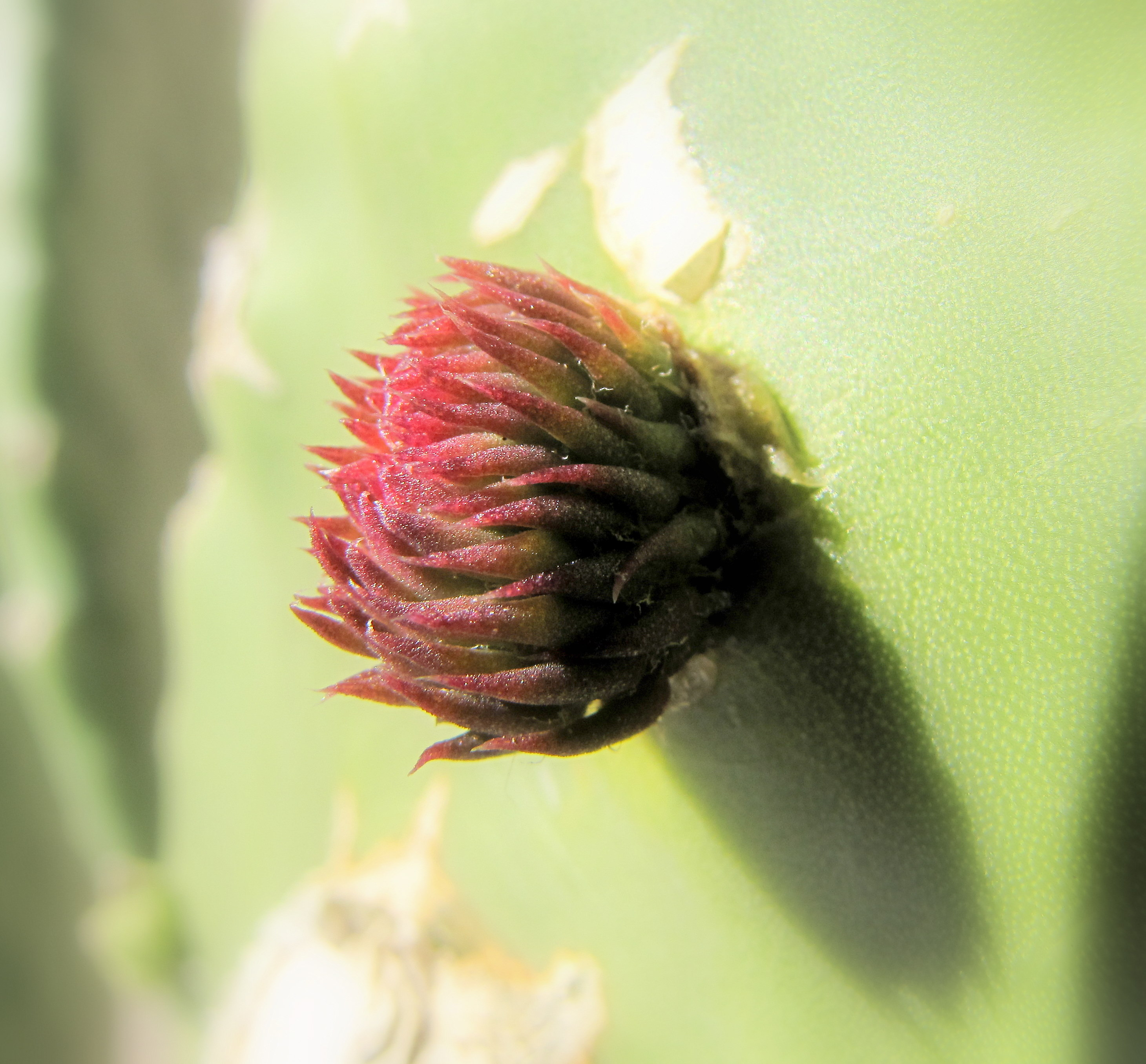
Bud emerging

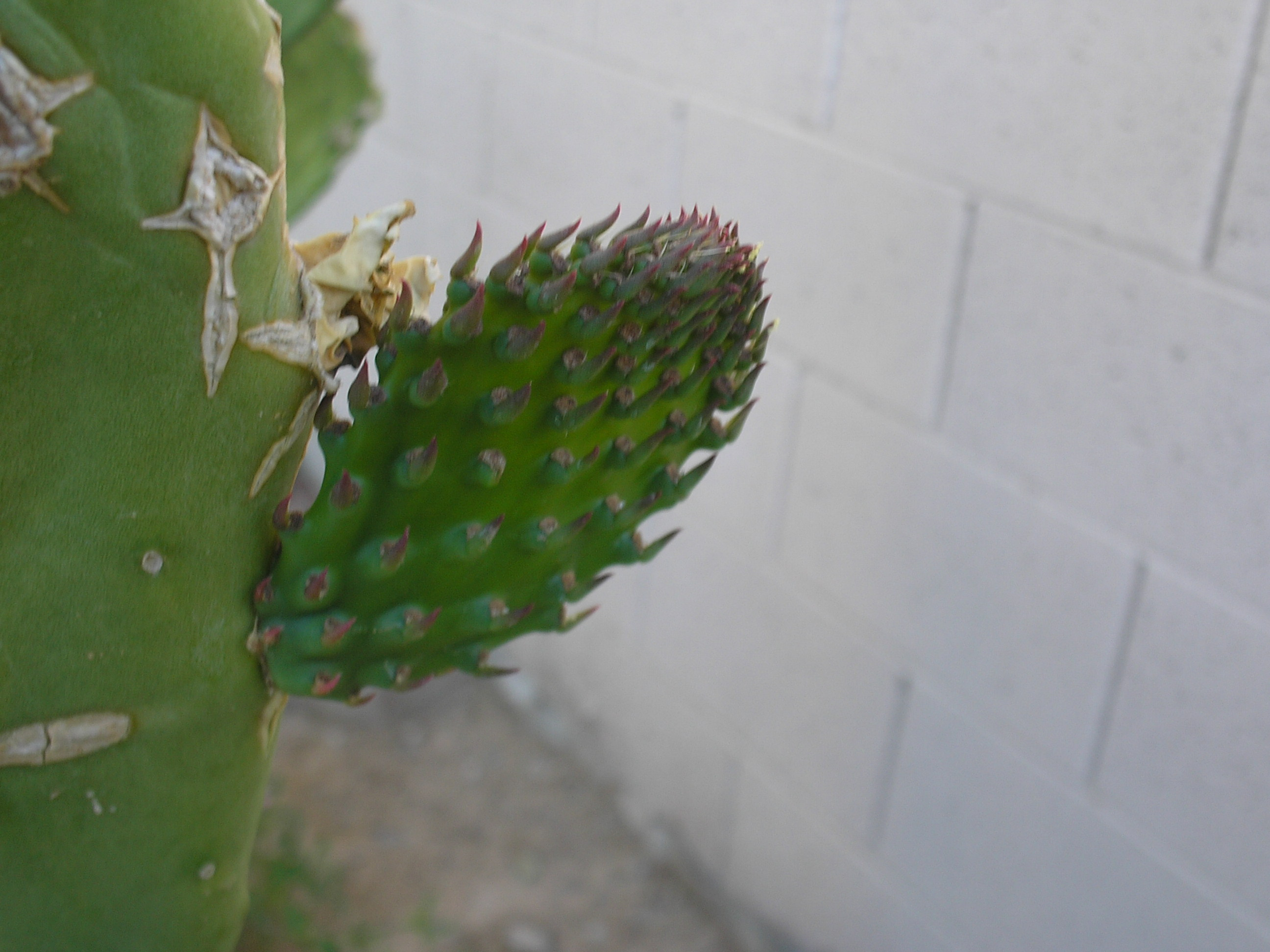
Young pad growing

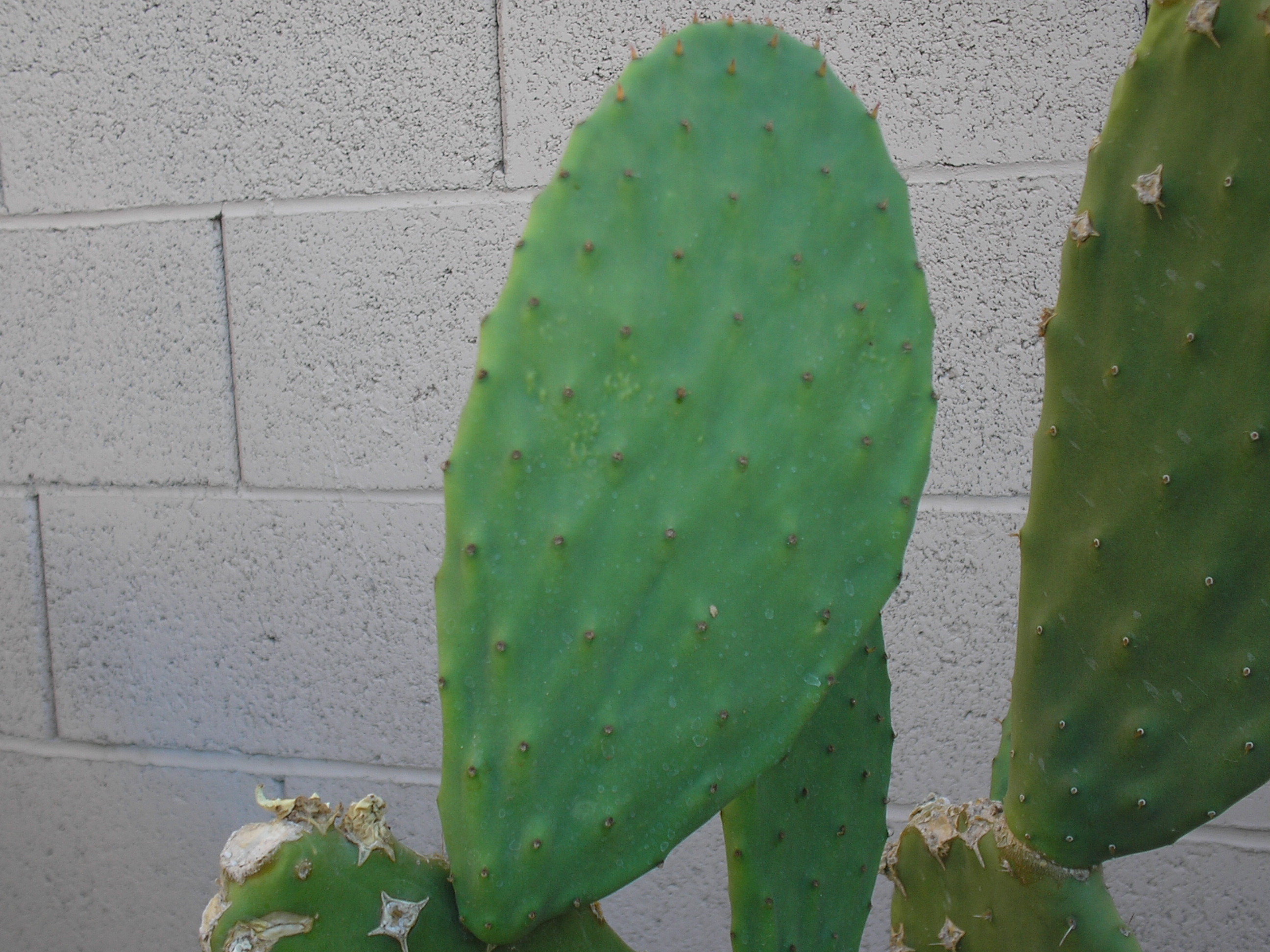
Spines start developing

== See also ==
- Nopaltilla
- Okra
