= Nopalito =

Mexican dish made with cactus

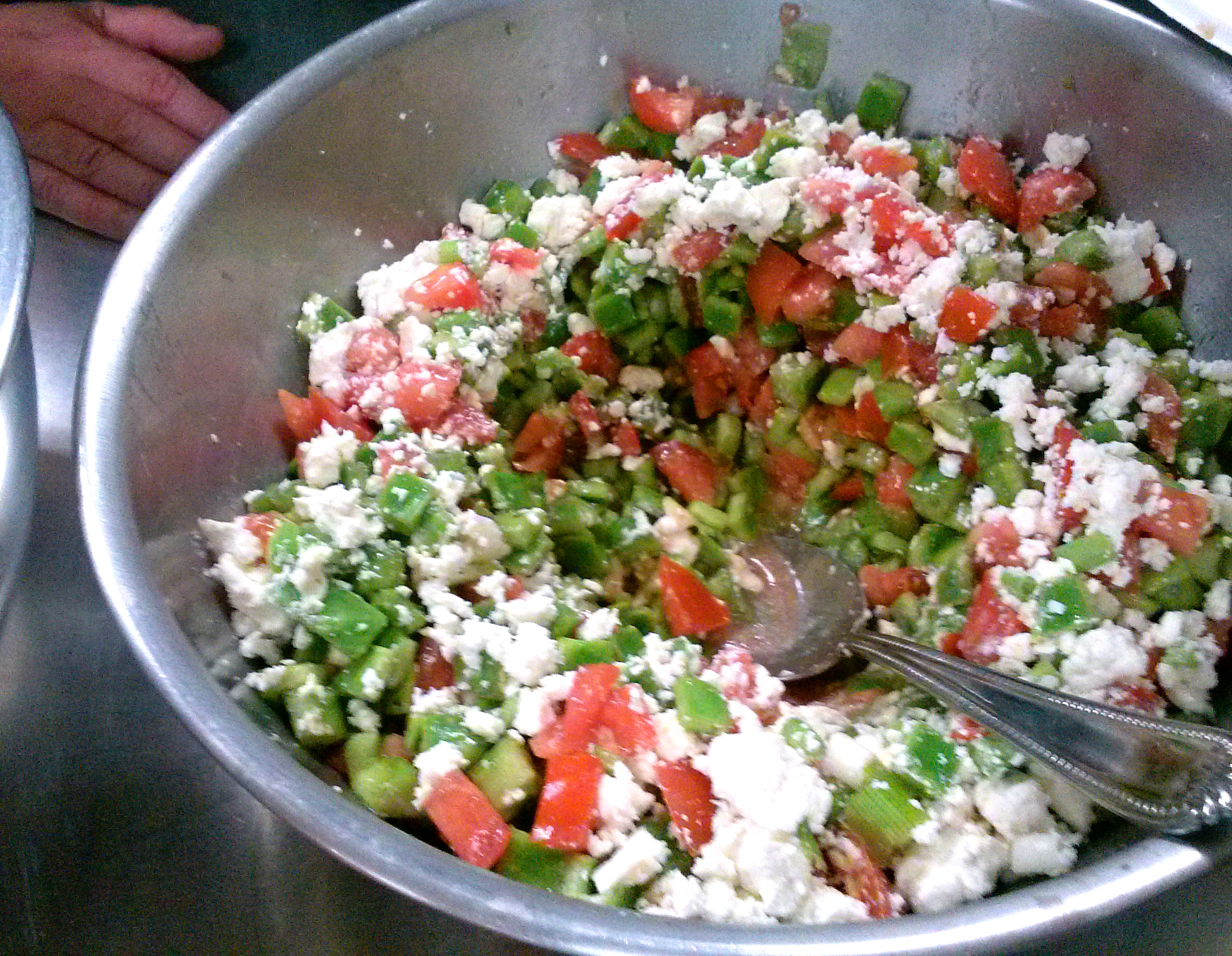
- Finely diced nopal cactus pads, with tomatoes, green onions, and crumbled cheese
- Place of origin: Mexico
- Main ingredients: Nopal

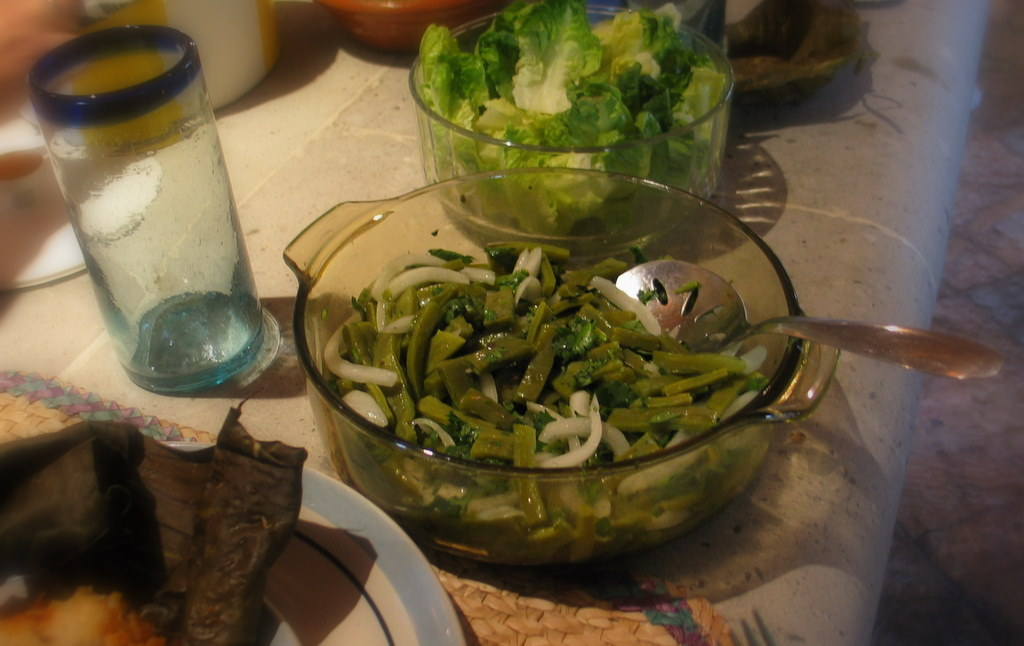
Nopal salad, with the nopal pads cut into strips

Nopalitos is a dish made with diced nopales, the naturally flat stems, called pads, of prickly pear cactus (Opuntia). They are sold fresh, bottled, or canned and less often dried. They have a light, tart flavor, and a crisp, mucilaginous texture. Nopalitos are often eaten with eggs as a breakfast and in salads and soups as lunch and dinner meals.

== See also ==
- List of Mexican dishes
