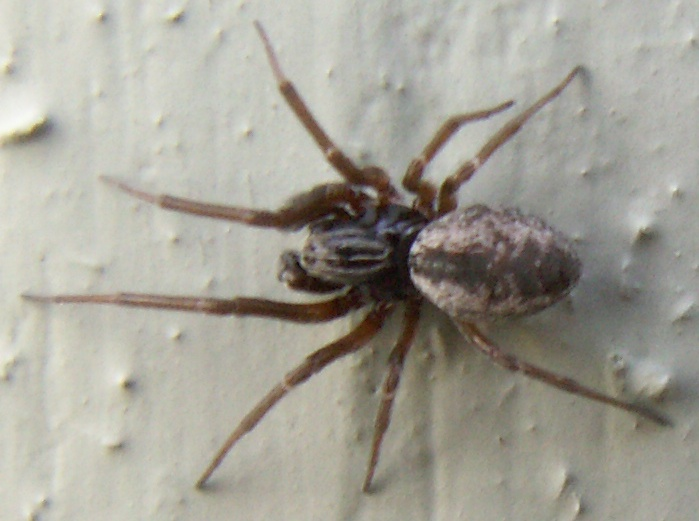
- Dictyna arundinacea

Scientific classification
- Domain: Eukaryota
- Kingdom: Animalia
- Phylum: Arthropoda
- Subphylum: Chelicerata
- Class: Arachnida
- Order: Araneae
- Infraorder: Araneomorphae
- Family: Dictynidae
- Genus: Dictyna; Sundevall, 1833

Type species
- D. arundinacea (Linnaeus, 1758)

Species
- 118, see text

= Dictyna =

Genus of spiders

Dictyna is a genus of cribellate araneomorph spiders in the family Dictynidae, and was first described by Carl Jakob Sundevall in 1833.

== Species ==
As of May 2019 it contains 118 species:

- D. abundans Chamberlin & Ivie, 1941 – USA
- D. agressa Ivie, 1947 – USA
- D. alaskae Chamberlin & Ivie, 1947 – North America, Northern Europe, Russia (Europe to Far East)
- D. albicoma Simon, 1893 – Venezuela
- D. albida O. Pickard-Cambridge, 1885 – India, Pakistan, China (Yarkand)
- D. albopilosa Franganillo, 1936 – Cuba
- D. albovittata Keyserling, 1881 – Peru
- D. alyceae Chickering, 1950 – Panama
- D. andesiana Berland, 1913 – Ecuador
- D. annexa Gertsch & Mulaik, 1936 – USA, Mexico
- D. apacheca Chamberlin & Ivie, 1935 – USA
- D. armata Thorell, 1875 – Ukraine, Georgia?
- D. arundinacea (Linnaeus, 1758) (type) – North America, Europe, Turkey, Caucasus, Russia (Europe to Far East), Iran, Central Asia, China, Korea, Japan
- D. bellans Chamberlin, 1919 – USA, Mexico
  - Dictyna b. hatchi Jones, 1948 – USA
- D. bispinosa Simon, 1906 – Myanmar
- D. bostoniensis Emerton, 1888 – USA, Canada
- D. brevitarsa Emerton, 1915 – USA, Canada
- D. cafayate Mello-Leitão, 1941 – Argentina
- D. calcarata Banks, 1904 – USA, Mexico. Introduced to Hawaii
- D. cambridgei Gertsch & Ivie, 1936 – Mexico
- D. cavata Jones, 1947 – USA, Cuba
- D. cebolla Ivie, 1947 – USA
- D. chandrai Tikader, 1966 – India
- D. cholla Gertsch & Davis, 1942 – USA, Mexico
- D. colona Simon, 1906 – New Caledonia
- D. coloradensis Chamberlin, 1919 – USA
- D. columbiana Becker, 1886 – Venezuela
- D. cronebergi Simon, 1889 – Turkmenistan
- D. crosbyi Gertsch & Mulaik, 1940 – USA
- D. dahurica Danilov, 2000 – Russia (South Siberia)
- D. dauna Chamberlin & Gertsch, 1958 – USA, Bahama Is.
- D. denisi (Lehtinen, 1967) – Niger
- D. donaldi Chickering, 1950 – Panama
- D. dunini Danilov, 2000 – Russia (Urals to Far East)
- D. ectrapela (Keyserling, 1886) – Peru
- D. felis Bösenberg & Strand, 1906 – Russia (Far East), China, Korea, Japan
- D. fluminensis Mello-Leitão, 1924 – Brazil
- D. foliacea (Hentz, 1850) – USA, Canada
- D. foliicola Bösenberg & Strand, 1906 – Russia (Far East), China, Korea, Japan
- D. formidolosa Gertsch & Ivie, 1936 – USA, Canada
- D. fuerteventurensis Schmidt, 1976 – Canary Is.
- D. gloria Chamberlin & Ivie, 1944 – USA
- D. guerrerensis Gertsch & Davis, 1937 – Mexico
- D. guineensis Denis, 1955 – Guinea
- D. hamifera Thorell, 1872 – Greenland, Finland, Russia (Siberia)
  - Dictyna h. simulans Kulczyński, 1916 – Russia (West Siberia)
- D. idahoana Chamberlin & Ivie, 1933 – USA
- D. ignobilis Kulczyński, 1895 – Moldova, Armenia
- D. incredula Gertsch & Davis, 1937 – Mexico
- D. jacalana Gertsch & Davis, 1937 – Mexico
- D. juno Ivie, 1947 – USA
- D. kosiorowiczi Simon, 1873 – Western Mediterranean
- D. laeviceps Simon, 1911 – Algeria
- D. lecta Chickering, 1952 – Panama
- D. linzhiensis Hu, 2001 – China
- D. livida (Mello-Leitão, 1941) – Argentina
- D. longispina Emerton, 1888 – USA
- D. major Menge, 1869 – North America, Europe, Russia (Europe to Far East), Tajikistan, China
- D. marilina Chamberlin, 1948 – USA
- D. meditata Gertsch, 1936 – Mexico to Panama, Cuba
- D. miniata Banks, 1898 – Mexico
- D. minuta Emerton, 1888 – USA, Canada
- D. moctezuma Gertsch & Davis, 1942 – Mexico
- D. mora Chamberlin & Gertsch, 1958 – USA
- D. namulinensis Hu, 2001 – China
- D. navajoa Gertsch & Davis, 1942 – Mexico
- D. nebraska Gertsch, 1946 – USA
- D. obydovi Marusik & Koponen, 1998 – Russia (South Siberia)
- D. ottoi Marusik & Koponen, 2017 – Azerbaijan, Georgia?, Iran?
- D. palmgreni Marusik & Fritzén, 2011 – Finland, Russia (Europe to northeastern Siberia)
- D. paramajor Danilov, 2000 – Russia (South Siberia)
- D. peon Chamberlin & Gertsch, 1958 – USA, Mexico
- D. personata Gertsch & Mulaik, 1936 – USA, Mexico
- D. pictella Chamberlin & Gertsch, 1958 – USA
- D. procerula Bösenberg & Strand, 1906 – Japan
- D. puebla Gertsch & Davis, 1937 – Mexico
- D. pusilla Thorell, 1856 – Europe, Turkey, Caucasus, Russia (Europe to Far East), Central Asia
- D. quadrispinosa Emerton, 1919 – USA
- D. ranchograndei Caporiacco, 1955 – Venezuela
- D. saepei Chamberlin & Ivie, 1941 – USA
- D. saltona Chamberlin & Gertsch, 1958 – USA
- D. sancta Gertsch, 1946 – USA, Canada
- D. schmidti Kulczyński, 1926 – Russia (West Siberia to Far East)
- D. secuta Chamberlin, 1924 – USA, Mexico
- D. sierra Chamberlin, 1948 – USA
- D. similis Keyserling, 1878 – Uruguay
- D. simoni Petrunkevitch, 1911 – Venezuela
- D. sinaloa Gertsch & Davis, 1942 – Mexico
- D. siniloanensis Barrion & Litsinger, 1995 – Philippines
- D. sinuata Esyunin & Sozontov, 2016 – Ukraine, Russia (Europe)
- D. sonora Gertsch & Davis, 1942 – Mexico
- D. sotnik Danilov, 1994 – Russia (South Siberia)
- D. subpinicola Ivie, 1947 – USA
- D. sylvania Chamberlin & Ivie, 1944 – USA
- D. szaboi Chyzer, 1891 – Austria, Hungary, Czech Rep., Slovakia, Russia (Europe), Kazakhstan
- D. tarda Schmidt, 1971 – Ecuador
- D. terrestris Emerton, 1911 – USA
- D. togata Simon, 1904 – Chile
- D. tridentata Bishop & Ruderman, 1946 – USA
- D. tristis Spassky, 1952 – Tajikistan
- D. trivirgata Mello-Leitão, 1943 – Chile
- D. tucsona Chamberlin, 1948 – USA, Mexico
- D. tullgreni Caporiacco, 1949 – Kenya
- D. turbida Simon, 1905 – India, Sri Lanka
- D. tyshchenkoi Marusik, 1988 – Russia (Urals to Far East)
  - Dictyna t. wrangeliana Marusik, 1988 – Russia (Wrangel Is.)
- D. ubsunurica Marusik & Koponen, 1998 – Russia (South Siberia)
- D. umai Tikader, 1966 – India
- D. uncinata Thorell, 1856 – Europe, Turkey, Caucasus, Russia (Europe to Far East), Central Asia, China, Japan
- D. uvs Marusik & Koponen, 1998 – Russia (South Siberia)
- D. vittata Keyserling, 1883 – Peru
- D. volucripes Keyserling, 1881 – North America
  - Dictyna v. volucripoides Ivie, 1947 – USA
- D. vultuosa Keyserling, 1881 – Peru
- D. xizangensis Hu & Li, 1987 – China
- D. yongshun Yin, Bao & Kim, 2001 – China
- D. zhangmuensis Hu, 2001 – China
