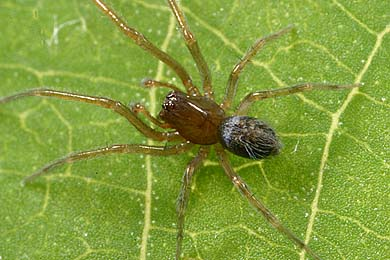
- Lathys insulana, male
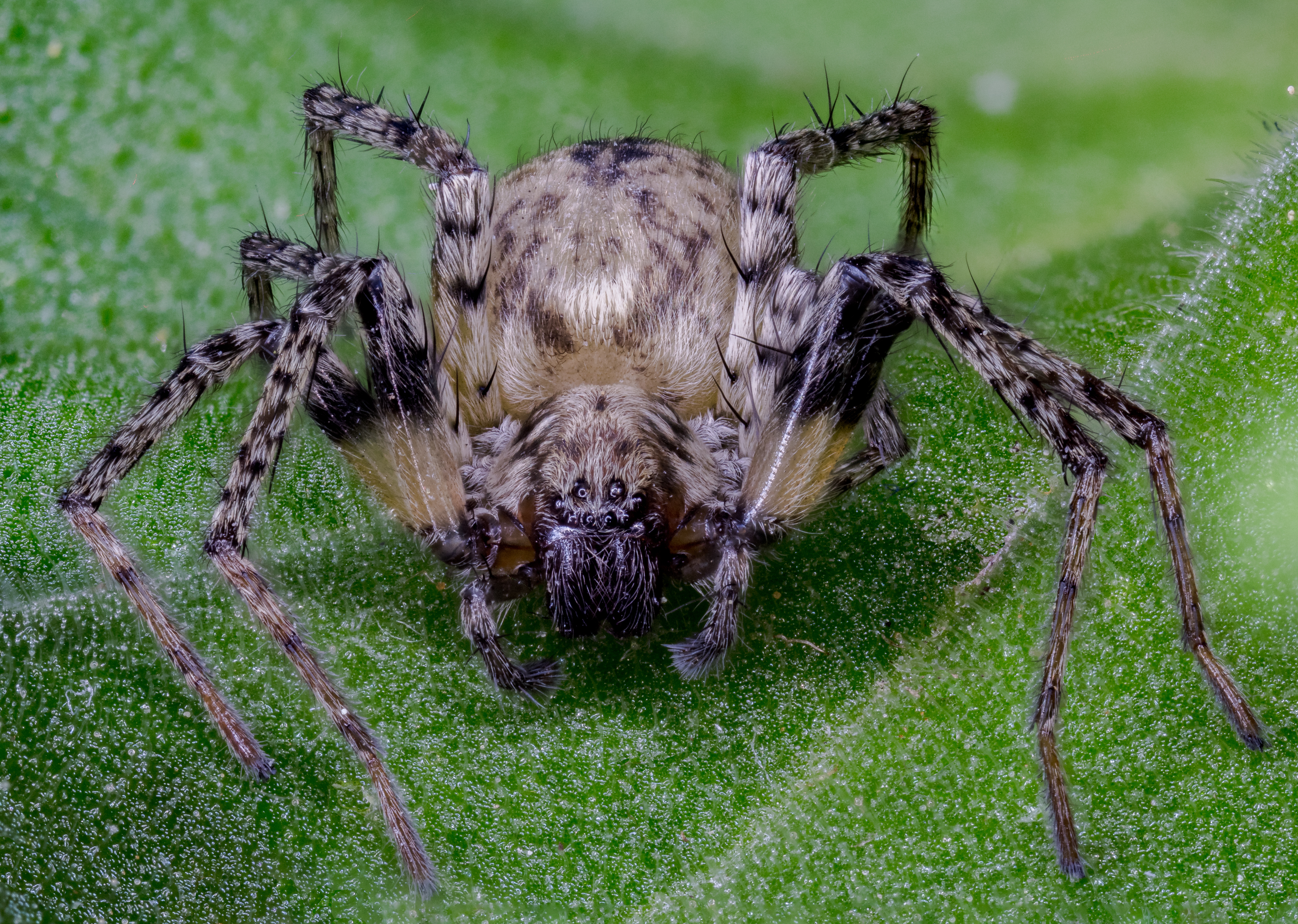
- Dictyna civica

Scientific classification
- Kingdom: Animalia
- Phylum: Arthropoda
- Subphylum: Chelicerata
- Class: Arachnida
- Order: Araneae
- Infraorder: Araneomorphae
- Family: Dictynidae; O. Pickard-Cambridge, 1871

Diversity
- 45 genera, 339 species
- blue: reported countries (WSC) green: observation hotspots (iNaturalist)

= Dictynidae =

Dictynidae Temporal range: Cretaceous–present

Family of spiders

Dictynidae is a family of cribellate, hackled band-producing spiders first described by Octavius Pickard-Cambridge in 1871. Most build irregular webs on or near the ground, creating a tangle of silken fibers among several branches or stems of one plant.

Several genera were transferred to the family Argyronetidae and others to the family Lathyidae in 2025.

== Genera ==
As of October 2025, this family includes 45 genera and 339 species:

- Adenodictyna Ono, 2008 – Japan
- Ajmonia Caporiacco, 1934 – Kazakhstan, China, Mongolia, India, Sri Lanka, Iran, Portugal, Spain, North Africa
- Anaxibia Thorell, 1898 – Angola, São Tomé and Príncipe, Indonesia, Myanmar, India, Sri Lanka
- Arangina Lehtinen, 1967 – New Zealand
- Archaeodictyna Caporiacco, 1928 – Africa, China, Myanmar, Europe to Central Asia,
- Arethyna Cala-Riquelme, 2025 – China, Russia, North America
- Argennina Gertsch & Mulaik, 1936 – United States
- Atelolathys Simon, 1892 – Sri Lanka
- Banaidja Lehtinen, 1967 – Samoa
- Brigittea Lehtinen, 1967 – Asia, Russia, New Caledonia, Mediterranean, North Africa. Introduced to South Africa
- Califorenigma Cala-Riquelme, Gorneau & Esposito, 2025 – United States
- Callevophthalmus Simon, 1906 – Australia
- Dictyna Sundevall, 1833 – Africa, Asia, Europe, North America, South America
- Dictynomorpha Spassky, 1939 – Central Asia
- Emblyna Chamberlin, 1948 – Europe, North America, Ecuador, Galapagos, Cuba, Greater Antilles
- Eriena Cala-Riquelme, Crews & Esposito, 2025 – North America
- Helenactyna Benoit, 1977 – St. Helena
- Khalotyna Cala-Riquelme, Alequín & Esposito, 2025 – North America. Introduced to Hawaii
- Kharitonovia Esyunin, Zamani & Tuneva, 2017 – Uzbekistan, Iran
- Mallos O. Pickard-Cambridge, 1902 – North to South America
- Maretyna Lin & Liu, 2025 – China
- Marilynia Lehtinen, 1967 – Europe to Central Asia, North Africa
- Mashimo Lehtinen, 1967 – South Africa, Zambia
- Mexitlia Lehtinen, 1967 – Mexico, United States
- Myanmardictyna Wunderlich, 2017 – Myanmar
- Nigma Lehtinen, 1967 – Africa, Asia, Southern Europe
- Nopalityna Cala-Riquelme & Esposito, 2025 – North America
- Pangunus Cala-Riquelme, 2025 – China, Mongolia, India
- Paradictyna Forster, 1970 – New Zealand
- Penangodyna Wunderlich, 1995 – Malaysia
- Phantyna Chamberlin, 1948 – North America, Galapagos, Venezuela
- Purplecorna Cala-Riquelme & Esposito, 2025 – North America
- Qiyunia Song & Xu, 1989 – China, Japan
- Rhion O. Pickard-Cambridge, 1871 – Sri Lanka
- Shango Lehtinen, 1967 – South Africa
- Shikibutyna Cala-Riquelme, Gorneau & Esposito, 2025 – Kazakhstan, Eastern Asia, Canary Islands, Central Europe, Russia
- Simziella Cala-Riquelme & Alequín, 2025 – Tajikistan, China, Canary Islands, Russia, Finland, North America
- Spagnius Cala-Riquelme & Crews, 2025 – Cuba, North America
- Sudesna Lehtinen, 1967 – China, Korea, Philippines, India, Australia
- Tahuantina Lehtinen, 1967 – Chile
- Tandil Mello-Leitão, 1940 – Argentina
- Thallumetus Simon, 1893 – Ascension Is, Bonaire, Virgin Islands, Panama, Mexico, United States, South America
- Tivyna Chamberlin, 1948 – Bahamas, Cuba, Mexico, United States, Galapagos
- Tolkienus Cala-Riquelme, Crews & Esposito, 2025 – Equatorial Guinea, Caucasus, Iran, Ukraine, Russia, North America
- Viridictyna Forster, 1970 – New Zealand
