= S. proximus =

S. proximus may refer to:

- Senoculus proximus, a spider species in the genus Senoculus endemic to Brazil
- Siphonops proximus, an amphibian species
- Spirembolus proximus, a spider species in the genus Spirembolus endemic to the United States

== See also ==
- Proximus (disambiguation)
