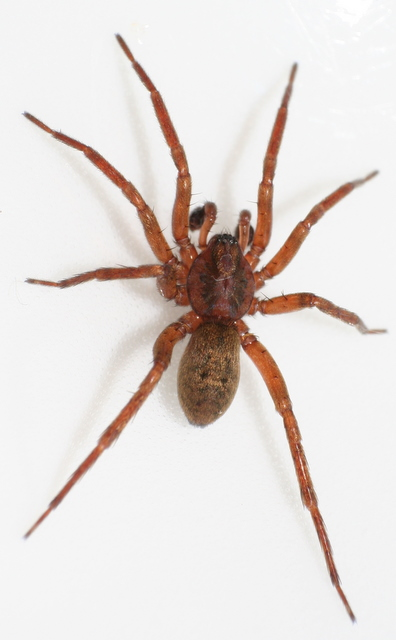
- Agroeca brunnea, male
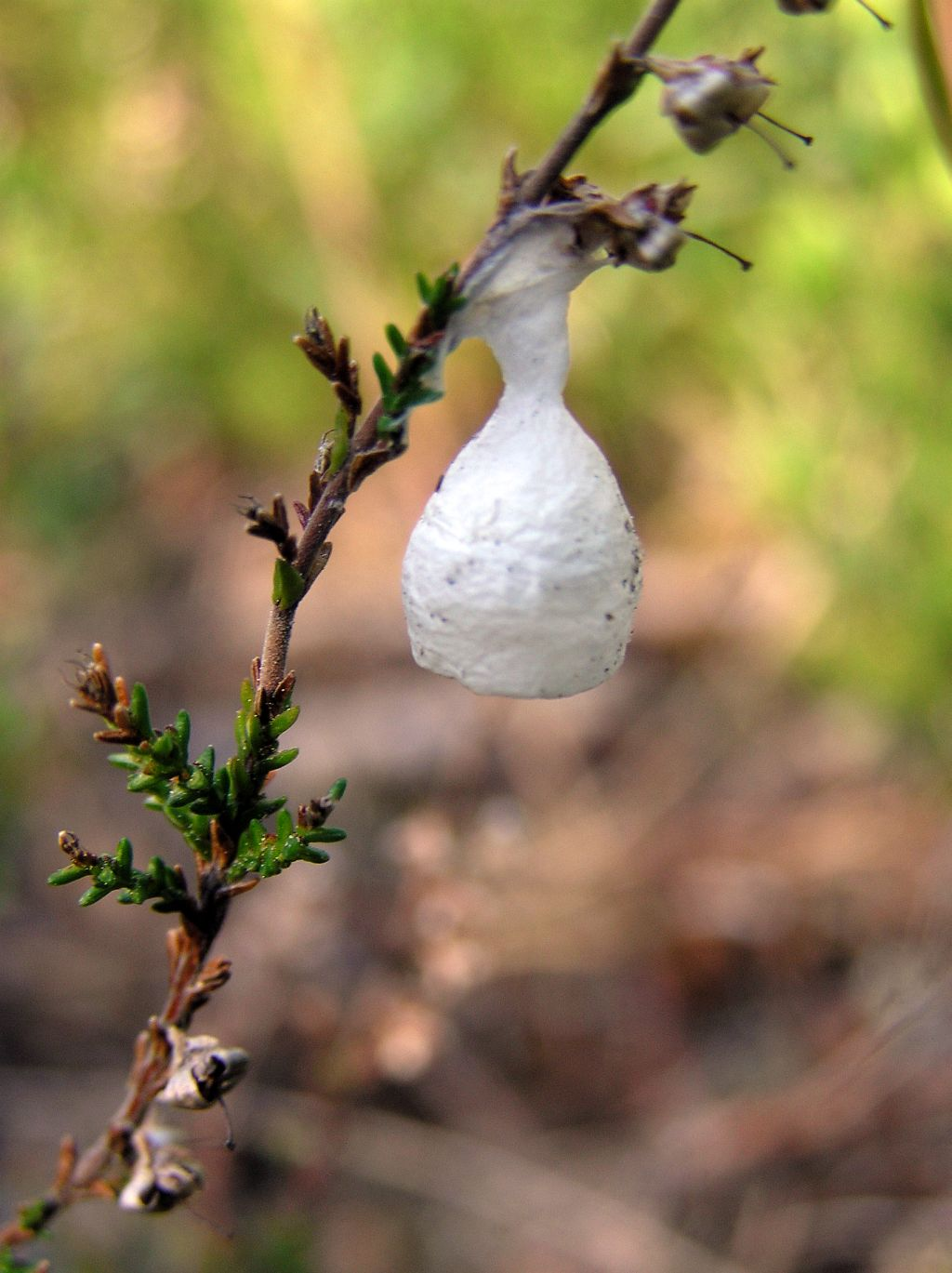
- cocoon

Scientific classification
- Kingdom: Animalia
- Phylum: Arthropoda
- Subphylum: Chelicerata
- Class: Arachnida
- Order: Araneae
- Infraorder: Araneomorphae
- Family: Liocranidae
- Genus: Agroeca; Westring, 1861

Type species
- A. proxima (O. Pickard-Cambridge, 1871)

Species
- 34, see text

Synonyms
- Hilke Keyserling, 1887

= Agroeca =

Genus of spiders

Agroeca is a genus of liocranid sac spiders that was first described by Niklas Westring in 1861.

== Species ==
As of October 2022 it contains thirty-five species, found in Africa, Asia, Europe, North America, Colombia, and Peru:

- Agroeca agrestis Ponomarev, 2007 – Kazakhstan
- Agroeca angirasu Zamani & Marusik, 2021 - Iran
- Agroeca annulipes Simon, 1878 – Spain, France (Corsica), Italy (Sardinia), Morocco, Algeria
- Agroeca aureoplumata Keyserling, 1879 – Colombia
- Agroeca batangensis Mu, Jin & Zhang, 2019 – China
- Agroeca bonghwaensis Seo, 2011 – Korea
- Agroeca brunnea (Blackwall, 1833) – Europe, Turkey, Russia (Europe to Far East), China, Japan
- Agroeca coreana Namkung, 1989 – Russia (Far East), China, Korea, Japan
- Agroeca cuprea Menge, 1873 – Europe, Caucasus, Russia (Europe to South Siberia), Central Asia
- Agroeca debilis O. Pickard-Cambridge, 1885 – China (Yarkand)
- Agroeca dentigera Kulczyński, 1913 – Europe, Turkey, China
- Agroeca dubiosissima (Strand, 1908) – Peru
- Agroeca flavens O. Pickard-Cambridge, 1885 – China (Yarkand)
- Agroeca gangotrae Biswas & Roy, 2008 – India
- Agroeca guttulata Simon, 1897 – Central Asia
- Agroeca inopina O. Pickard-Cambridge, 1886 – Europe, Algeria
- Agroeca kamurai Hayashi, 1992 – China, Japan
- Agroeca kastoni Chamberlin & Ivie, 1944 – USA
- Agroeca lata Mu, Jin & Zhang, 2019 – China
- Agroeca lusatica (L. Koch, 1875) – Europe, Russia (Europe to South Siberia), Kazakhstan
- Agroeca maculata L. Koch, 1879 – Russia (Europe to Far East), Kazakhstan
- Agroeca maghrebensis Bosmans, 1999 – Morocco, Algeria, Tunisia
- Agroeca mainlingensis Mu, Jin & Zhang, 2019 – China
- Agroeca makarovae Esyunin, 2008 – Russia (Europe)
- Agroeca minuta Banks, 1895 – USA
- Agroeca mongolica Schenkel, 1936 – Mongolia, China, Korea
- Agroeca montana Hayashi, 1986 – Russia (Far East), China, Korea, Japan
- Agroeca nigra Mu, Jin & Zhang, 2019 – China
- Agroeca ornata Banks, 1892 – USA, Canada, Russia (Middle Siberia to Far East)
- Agroeca parva Bosmans, 2011 – Greece, Turkey, Israel
- Agroeca pratensis Emerton, 1890 – USA, Canada
- Agroeca proxima (O. Pickard-Cambridge, 1871) (type) – Europe, Turkey, Russia (Europe to South Siberia)
- Agroeca spinifera Kaston, 1938 – USA
- Agroeca trivittata (Keyserling, 1887) – USA
- Agroeca tumida Mu, Jin & Zhang, 2019 – China
