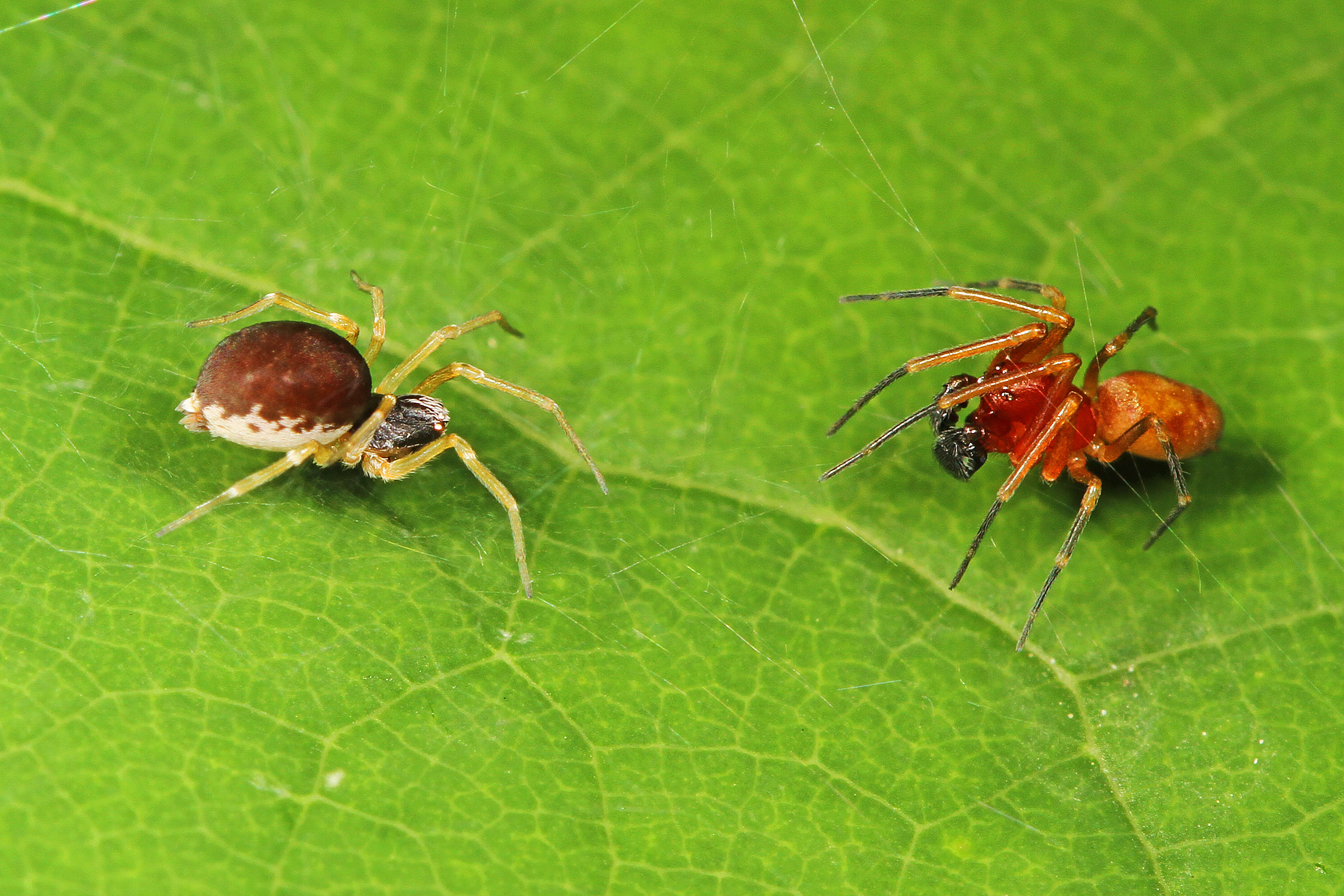
- Emblyna sp. from Leesylvania State Park, Woodbridge, Virginia. Note sexual dimorphism. The male (right) is courting the female (left).

Scientific classification
- Kingdom: Animalia
- Phylum: Arthropoda
- Subphylum: Chelicerata
- Class: Arachnida
- Order: Araneae
- Infraorder: Araneomorphae
- Family: Dictynidae
- Genus: Emblyna; Chamberlin, 1948

Type species
- E. completa (Chamberlin & Gertsch, 1929)

Species
- 76, see text

= Emblyna =

Genus of spiders

Emblyna is a genus of cribellate araneomorph spiders in the family Dictynidae. It was first described by R. V. Chamberlin in 1948.

== Species ==
As of May 2019, it contains more than seventy species:

- E. acoreensis Wunderlich, 1992 – Azores
- E. aiko (Chamberlin & Gertsch, 1958) – USA
- E. altamira (Gertsch & Davis, 1942) – USA, Mexico, Greater Antilles
- E. angulata (Emerton, 1915) – USA
- E. annulipes (Blackwall, 1846) – North America, Europe, Turkey, Caucasus, Russia (Europe to Far East)
- E. ardea (Chamberlin & Gertsch, 1958) – USA
- E. artemisia (Ivie, 1947) – USA
- E. borealis (O. Pickard-Cambridge, 1877) – Russia (northeastern Siberia), USA, Canada, Greenland
  - Emblyna b. cavernosa (Jones, 1947) – USA
- E. branchi (Chamberlin & Gertsch, 1958) – USA
- E. brevidens (Kulczyński, 1897) – Europe
- E. budarini Marusik, 1988 – Russia (northeastern Siberia)
- E. burjatica (Danilov, 1994) – Russia (Urals to Far East)
- E. callida (Gertsch & Ivie, 1936) – USA, Mexico
- E. capens Chamberlin, 1948 – USA
- E. chitina (Chamberlin & Gertsch, 1958) – USA (Alaska), Canada
- E. completa (Chamberlin & Gertsch, 1929) (type) – USA
- E. completoides (Ivie, 1947) – USA, Canada
- E. consulta (Gertsch & Ivie, 1936) – North America
- E. cornupeta (Bishop & Ruderman, 1946) – USA, Mexico
- E. coweta (Chamberlin & Gertsch, 1958) – USA
- E. crocana Chamberlin, 1948 – USA
- E. cruciata (Emerton, 1888) – USA, Canada
- E. decaprini (Kaston, 1945) – USA
- E. evicta (Gertsch & Mulaik, 1940) – USA
- E. florens (Ivie & Barrows, 1935) – USA
- E. formicaria Baert, 1987 – Ecuador (Galapagos Is.)
- E. francisca (Bishop & Ruderman, 1946) – USA
- E. hentzi (Kaston, 1945) – USA, Canada
- E. horta (Gertsch & Ivie, 1936) – USA
- E. hoya (Chamberlin & Ivie, 1941) – USA
- E. iviei (Gertsch & Mulaik, 1936) – USA, Mexico
- E. joaquina (Chamberlin & Gertsch, 1958) – USA
- E. jonesae (Roewer, 1955) – USA
- E. kaszabi Marusik & Koponen, 1998 – Mongolia
- E. klamatha (Chamberlin & Gertsch, 1958) – USA
- E. lina (Gertsch, 1946) – USA, Mexico
- E. linda (Chamberlin & Gertsch, 1958) – USA
- E. littoricolens (Chamberlin & Ivie, 1935) – USA
- E. manitoba (Ivie, 1947) – USA, Canada
- E. mariae Chamberlin, 1948 – USA, Mexico
- E. marissa (Chamberlin & Gertsch, 1958) – USA
- E. maxima (Banks, 1892) – USA, Canada
- E. melva (Chamberlin & Gertsch, 1958) – USA
- E. mitis (Thorell, 1875) – Norway, Germany, Czech Rep., Hungary, Romania
- E. mongolica Marusik & Koponen, 1998 – Russia (Europe to South Siberia), Mongolia
- E. nanda (Chamberlin & Gertsch, 1958) – USA
- E. oasa (Ivie, 1947) – USA
- E. olympiana (Chamberlin, 1919) – USA
- E. orbiculata (Jones, 1947) – USA
- E. oregona (Gertsch, 1946) – USA
- E. osceola (Chamberlin & Gertsch, 1958) – USA
- E. oxtotilpanensis (Jiménez & Luz, 1986) – Mexico
- E. palomara Chamberlin, 1948 – USA
- E. peragrata (Bishop & Ruderman, 1946) – USA, Canada
- E. phylax (Gertsch & Ivie, 1936) – USA, Canada
- E. pinalia (Chamberlin & Gertsch, 1958) – USA
- E. piratica (Ivie, 1947) – USA
- E. reticulata (Gertsch & Ivie, 1936) – USA, Mexico
- E. roscida (Hentz, 1850) – North, Central America
- E. saylori (Chamberlin & Ivie, 1941) – USA
- E. scotta Chamberlin, 1948 – USA, Mexico
- E. seminola (Chamberlin & Gertsch, 1958) – USA
- E. serena (Chamberlin & Gertsch, 1958) – USA
- E. shasta (Chamberlin & Gertsch, 1958) – USA
- E. shoshonea (Chamberlin & Gertsch, 1958) – USA
- E. stulta (Gertsch & Mulaik, 1936) – USA
- E. sublata (Hentz, 1850) – USA
- E. sublatoides (Ivie & Barrows, 1935) – USA
- E. suprenans (Chamberlin & Ivie, 1935) – USA
- E. suwanea (Gertsch, 1946) – USA
- E. teideensis Wunderlich, 1992 – Canary Is.
- E. uintana (Chamberlin, 1919) – USA
- E. wangi (Song & Zhou, 1986) – Russia (Europe to South Siberia), Kazakhstan, Mongolia, China
- E. zaba (Barrows & Ivie, 1942) – USA
- E. zherikhini (Marusik, 1988) – Russia (Middle Siberia to Far East)
