= Spirembolus redondo =

Scientific classification
- Kingdom: Animalia
- Phylum: Arthropoda
- Subphylum: Chelicerata
- Class: Arachnida
- Order: Araneae
- Infraorder: Araneomorphae
- Family: Linyphiidae
- Genus: Spirembolus
- Species: S. redondo

Binomial name
- Spirembolus redondo (Chamberlin & Ivie, 1945)

Species of spider

Spirembolus redondo is a species of sheet weaver found in the United States. It was described by Chamberlin & Ivie in 1945.
