= Emblyna reticulata =

Scientific classification
- Kingdom: Animalia
- Phylum: Arthropoda
- Subphylum: Chelicerata
- Class: Arachnida
- Order: Araneae
- Infraorder: Araneomorphae
- Family: Dictynidae
- Genus: Emblyna
- Species: E. reticulata

Binomial name
- Emblyna reticulata (Gertsch & Ivie, 1936)

Species of spider

Emblyna reticulata is a species of mesh web weaver in the spider family Dictynidae. It is found in the United States and Mexico.
