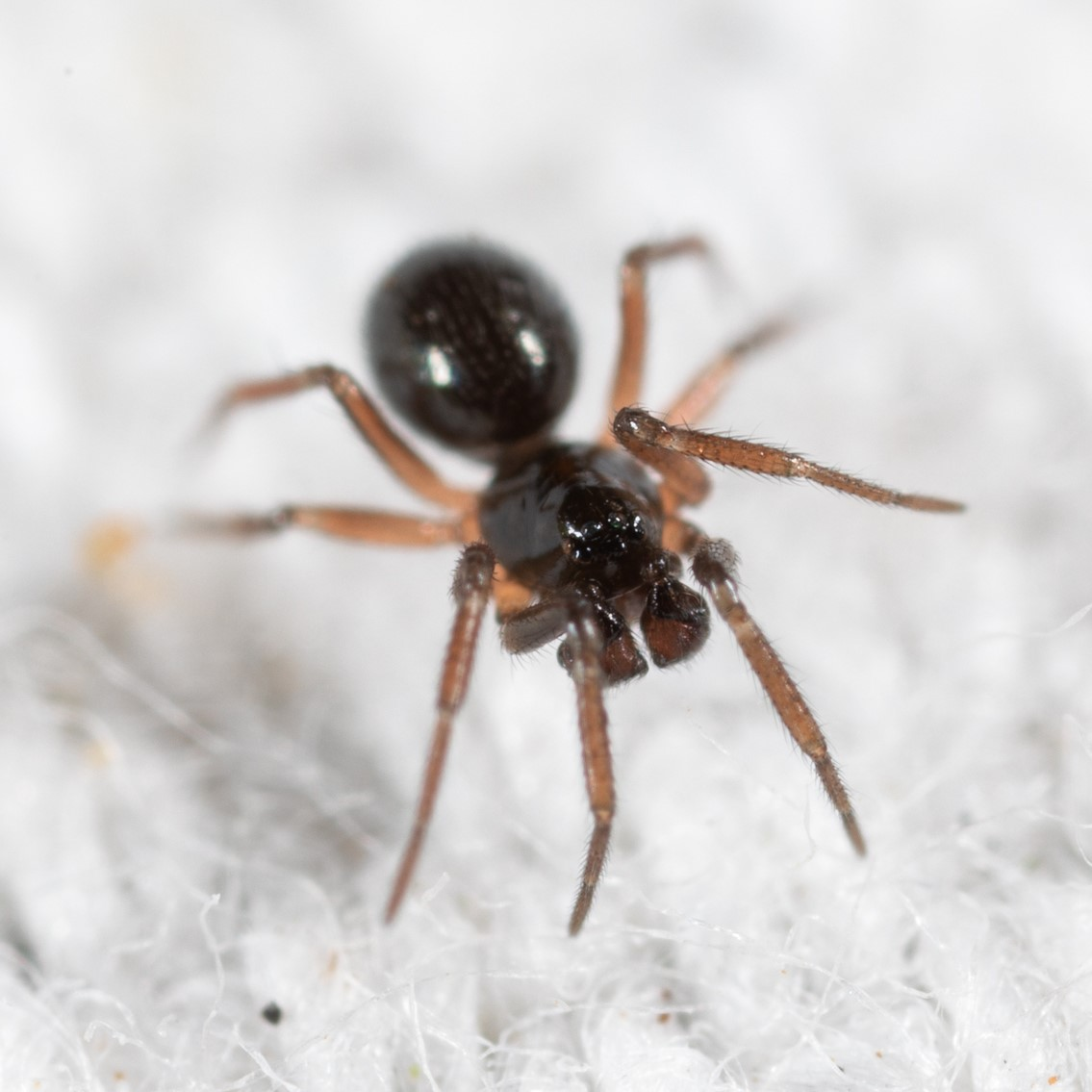
- Tachygyna vancouverana

Scientific classification
- Kingdom: Animalia
- Phylum: Arthropoda
- Subphylum: Chelicerata
- Class: Arachnida
- Order: Araneae
- Infraorder: Araneomorphae
- Family: Linyphiidae
- Genus: Tachygyna; Chamberlin & Ivie, 1939

Type species
- T. vancouverana Chamberlin & Ivie, 1939

Species
- 15, see text

= Tachygyna =

Genus of spiders

Tachygyna is a genus of sheet weavers that was erected by Ralph Vary Chamberlin & Vaine Wilton Ivie in 1939.

== Species ==
As of May 2019 it contains fifteen species, all found in North America:

- Tachygyna alia Millidge, 1984
- Tachygyna cognata Millidge, 1984
- Tachygyna coosi Millidge, 1984
- Tachygyna delecta Chamberlin & Ivie, 1939
- Tachygyna exilis Millidge, 1984
- Tachygyna gargopa (Crosby & Bishop, 1929)
- Tachygyna haydeni Chamberlin & Ivie, 1939
- Tachygyna pallida Chamberlin & Ivie, 1939
- Tachygyna proba Millidge, 1984
- Tachygyna sonoma Millidge, 1984
- Tachygyna speciosa Millidge, 1984
- Tachygyna tuoba (Chamberlin & Ivie, 1933)
- Tachygyna ursina (Bishop & Crosby, 1938)
- Tachygyna vancouverana Chamberlin & Ivie, 1939 (type)
- Tachygyna watona Chamberlin, 1949
