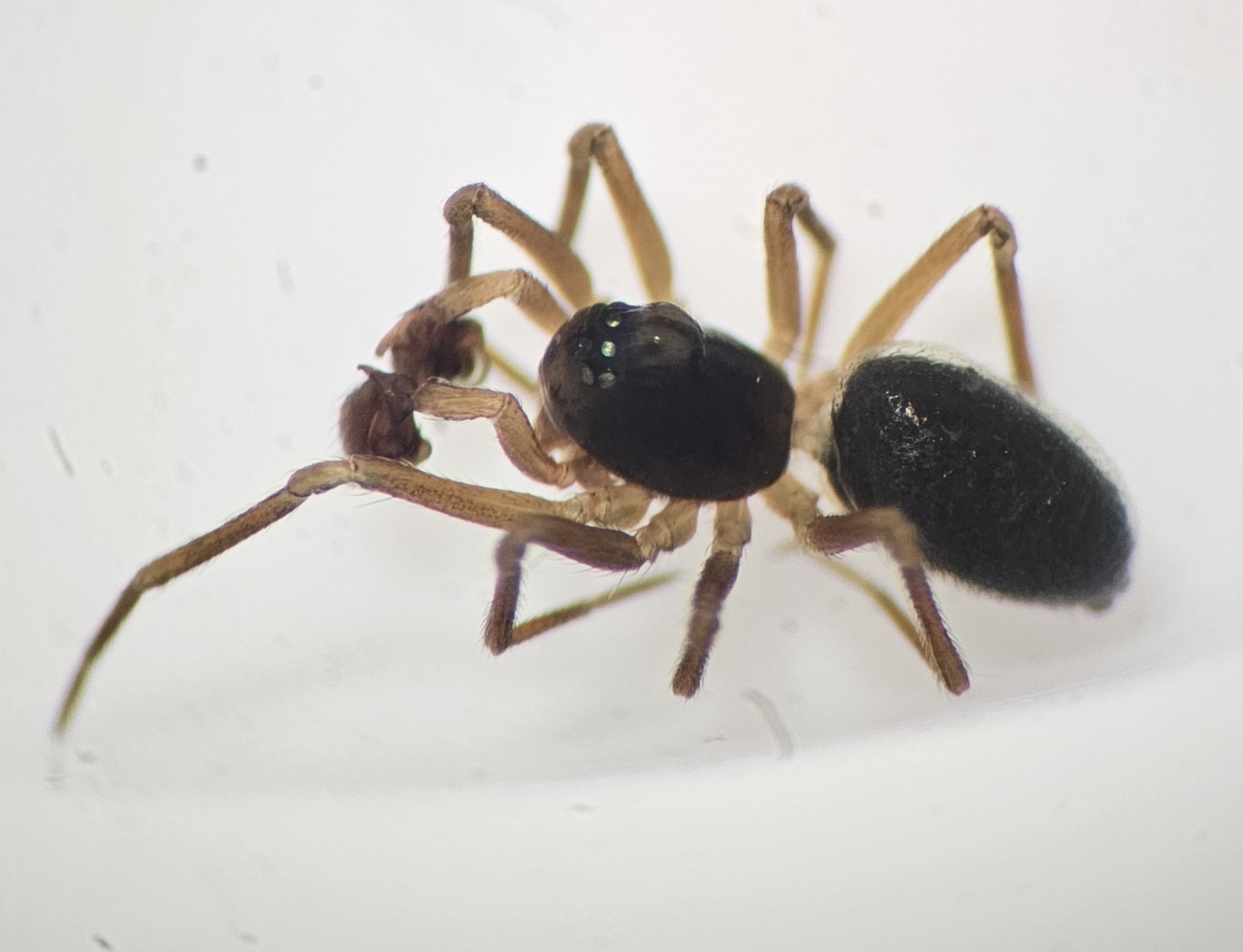

Scientific classification
- Kingdom: Animalia
- Phylum: Arthropoda
- Subphylum: Chelicerata
- Class: Arachnida
- Order: Araneae
- Infraorder: Araneomorphae
- Family: Linyphiidae
- Genus: Disembolus
- Species: D. corneliae

Binomial name
- Disembolus corneliae (Chamberlin & Ivie, 1944)

= Disembolus corneliae =

Species of spider

Disembolus corneliae is a species of dwarf spider in the family Linyphiidae. It is found in the United States.
