= Calilena =

Scientific classification
- Kingdom: Animalia
- Phylum: Arthropoda
- Subphylum: Chelicerata
- Class: Arachnida
- Order: Araneae
- Infraorder: Araneomorphae
- Family: Agelenidae
- Genus: Calilena; Chamberlin & Ivie, 1941

Type species
- C. saylori Chamberlin & Ivie, 1941

Species
- 21, see text

Genus of spiders

Calilena is a genus of North American funnel weavers first described by R. V. Chamberlin & Wilton Ivie in 1941.

== Species ==
As of October 2026 it contains twenty-one species:

- Calilena absoluta (Gertsch, 1936) – USA
- Calilena adna Chamberlin & Ivie, 1941 – USA
- Calilena angelena Chamberlin & Ivie, 1941 – USA, Mexico
- Calilena arizonica Chamberlin & Ivie, 1941 – USA
- Calilena californica (Banks, 1896) – USA
- Calilena gertschi Chamberlin & Ivie, 1941 – USA
- Calilena gosoga Chamberlin & Ivie, 1941 – USA
- Calilena magna Chamberlin & Ivie, 1941 – USA
- Calilena nita Chamberlin & Ivie, 1941 – USA
- Calilena peninsulana (Banks, 1898) – Mexico
- Calilena restricta Chamberlin & Ivie, 1941 – USA
  - Calilena r. dixiana Chamberlin & Ivie, 1941 – USA
- Calilena saylori Chamberlin & Ivie, 1941 – USA
- Calilena siva Chamberlin & Ivie, 1941 – USA
- Calilena stylophora Chamberlin & Ivie, 1941 – USA
  - Calilena s. laguna Chamberlin & Ivie, 1941 – USA
  - Calilena s. oregona Chamberlin & Ivie, 1941 – USA
  - Calilena s. pomona Chamberlin & Ivie, 1941 – USA
- Calilena umatilla Chamberlin & Ivie, 1941 – USA
  - Calilena u. schizostyla Chamberlin & Ivie, 1941 – USA
- Calilena yosemita Chamberlin & Ivie, 1941 – USA
