= Arcuphantes =

- Arcuphantes bandoi

Scientific classification
- Kingdom: Animalia
- Phylum: Arthropoda
- Subphylum: Chelicerata
- Class: Arachnida
- Order: Araneae
- Infraorder: Araneomorphae
- Family: Linyphiidae
- Genus: Arcuphantes; Chamberlin & Ivie, 1943

Type species
- A. fragilis Chamberlin & Ivie, 1943

Species
- 57, see text

Genus of spiders

Arcuphantes is a genus of dwarf spiders that was first described by Ralph Vary Chamberlin & Vaine Wilton Ivie in 1943.

== Species ==
As of May 2021 it contains fifty-seven species found in Asia (many in Japan and Korea) and North America:

- A. arcuatulus (Roewer, 1942) – USA, Canada
- A. ashifuensis (Oi, 1960) – Japan
- A. awanus Ono & Saito, 2001 – Japan
- A. cavaticus Chamberlin & Ivie, 1943 – USA
- A. chikunii Oi, 1979 – Japan
- A. chilboensis Oi, 1979 – Korea
- A. chinensis Tanasevitch, 2006 – China
- A. concheus Ono & Saito, 2001 – Japan
- A. cruciatus Jin, Ma & Tu, 2018 – USA
- A. curvomarginatus Ma, Marusik & Tu, 2016 – USA
- A. decoratus Chamberlin & Ivie, 1943 – USA
- A. delicatus (Chikuni, 1955) – Japan
- A. dentatus Ma, Marusik & Tu, 2016 – USA
- A. denticulatus Jin, Ma & Tu, 2018 – USA
- A. digitatus Saito, 1992 – Japan
- A. dubiosus Heimer, 1987 – Mongolia
- A. elephantis Ono & Saito, 2001 – Japan
- A. ephippiatus Paik, 1985 – Korea
- A. fragilis Chamberlin & Ivie, 1943 (type) – USA
- A. fujiensis Yaginuma, 1972 – Japan
- A. hamadai Oi, 1979 – Japan
- A. hastatus Ono & Saito, 2001 – Japan
- A. hikosanensis Saito, 1992 – Japan
- A. hokkaidanus Saito, 1992 – Japan
- A. iriei Saito, 1992 – Japan
- A. juwangensis Seo, 2006 – Korea
- A. keumsanensis Paik & Seo, 1984 – Korea
- A. kobayashii Oi, 1979 – Korea, Japan
- A. longipollex Seo, 2013 – Korea
- A. longissimus Saito, 1992 – Japan
- A. namhaensis Seo, 2006 – Korea
- A. namweonensis Seo, 2006 – Korea
- A. orbiculatus Saito, 1992 – Japan
- A. osugiensis (Oi, 1960) – Japan
- A. paiki Saito, 1992 – Japan
- A. pennatoides Paik, 1983 – Korea
- A. pennatus Paik, 1983 – Korea
- A. pictilis Chamberlin & Ivie, 1943 – USA
- A. potteri Chamberlin & Ivie, 1943 – USA
- A. profundus Seo, 2013 – Korea
- A. pulchellus Paik, 1978 – Korea
- A. pyeongchangensis Paik, 1978 – Korea
- A. rarus Seo, 2013 – Korea
- A. rostratus Ono & Saito, 2001 – Japan
- A. saragaminensis Ono & Saito, 2001 – Japan
- A. scitulus Paik, 1974 – Korea
- A. semiorbiculatus Jin, Ma & Tu, 2018 – USA
- A. sylvaticus Chamberlin & Ivie, 1943 – USA
- A. tamaensis (Oi, 1960) – Japan
- A. trifidus Seo, 2013 – Korea
- A. troglodytarum (Oi, 1960) – Japan
- A. tsushimanus Ono & Saito, 2001 – Japan
- A. uenoi Saito, 1992 – Japan
- A. uhmi Seo & Sohn, 1997 – Korea
- A. yamakawai (Oi, 1960) – Japan
