= Calilena angelena =

Scientific classification
- Kingdom: Animalia
- Phylum: Arthropoda
- Subphylum: Chelicerata
- Class: Arachnida
- Order: Araneae
- Infraorder: Araneomorphae
- Family: Agelenidae
- Genus: Calilena
- Species: C. angelena

Binomial name
- Calilena angelena Chamberlin & Ivie, 1941

Species of spider

Calilena angelena is a species of funnel weaver in the spider family Agelenidae. It is found in the United States and Mexico.
