= Linyphantes =

Scientific classification
- Kingdom: Animalia
- Phylum: Arthropoda
- Subphylum: Chelicerata
- Class: Arachnida
- Order: Araneae
- Infraorder: Araneomorphae
- Family: Linyphiidae
- Genus: Linyphantes; Chamberlin & Ivie, 1942

Type species
- L. aeronauticus (Petrunkevitch, 1929)

Species
- 19, see text

Synonyms
- Centromeroides Schenkel, 1950

Genus of spiders

Linyphantes is a genus of North American dwarf spiders that was first described by Ralph Vary Chamberlin & Vaine Wilton Ivie in 1942.

== Species ==
As of May 2019 it contains nineteen species and one subspecies, found in Canada, Mexico, and the United States:

- Linyphantes aeronauticus (Petrunkevitch, 1929) (type) – USA
- Linyphantes aliso Chamberlin & Ivie, 1942 – USA
- Linyphantes anacortes Chamberlin & Ivie, 1942 – USA
- Linyphantes delmarus Chamberlin & Ivie, 1942 – USA
- Linyphantes distinctus Chamberlin & Ivie, 1942 – USA
- Linyphantes eureka Chamberlin & Ivie, 1942 – USA
- Linyphantes laguna Chamberlin & Ivie, 1942 – USA
- Linyphantes microps Chamberlin & Ivie, 1942 – USA
- Linyphantes natches Chamberlin & Ivie, 1942 – USA
- Linyphantes nehalem Chamberlin & Ivie, 1942 – USA
- Linyphantes nigrescens Chamberlin & Ivie, 1942 – USA
- Linyphantes obscurus Chamberlin & Ivie, 1942 – USA
- Linyphantes orcinus (Emerton, 1917) – USA, Canada
- Linyphantes pacificus (Banks, 1906) – USA
- Linyphantes pacificus Chamberlin & Ivie, 1942 – USA
- Linyphantes pualla Chamberlin & Ivie, 1942 – USA, Canada
- Linyphantes santinez Chamberlin & Ivie, 1942 – USA
  - Linyphantes s. verdugo Chamberlin & Ivie, 1942 – USA
- Linyphantes tragicus (Banks, 1898) – Mexico
- Linyphantes victoria Chamberlin & Ivie, 1942 – Canada
