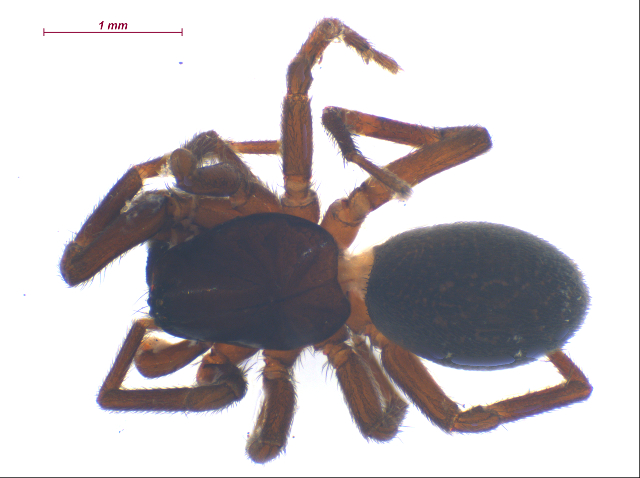
- Tricholathys rothi, male

Scientific classification
- Kingdom: Animalia
- Phylum: Arthropoda
- Subphylum: Chelicerata
- Class: Arachnida
- Order: Araneae
- Infraorder: Araneomorphae
- Family: Argyronetidae
- Genus: Tricholathys; Chamberlin & Ivie, 1935

Type species
- T. spiralis Chamberlin & Ivie, 1935

Species
- 20, see text

= Tricholathys =

Genus of spiders

Tricholathys is a genus of cribellate araneomorph spiders in the family Argyronetidae. It was first described by R. V. Chamberlin & Wilton Ivie in 1935.

== Distribution ==
Most species in this genus are endemic to China or North America, with a few from Kyrgyzstan, Tajikistan and the Caucasus.

== Species ==
As of October 2025, this genus includes twenty species:

- Tricholathys alxa (Tang, 2011) – China
- Tricholathys burangensis Wang, Peng & Zhang, 2023 – China
- Tricholathys cascadea Chamberlin & Gertsch, 1958 – United States
- Tricholathys chenzhenningi Wang, Peng & Zhang, 2023 – China
- Tricholathys hansi (Schenkel, 1950) – United States
- Tricholathys hebeiensis Wang, Peng & Zhang, 2023 – China
- Tricholathys hirsutipes (Banks, 1921) – United States
- Tricholathys jacinto Chamberlin & Gertsch, 1958 – United States
- Tricholathys knulli Gertsch & Mulaik, 1936 – United States
- Tricholathys lhunzeensis Wang, Peng & Zhang, 2023 – China
- Tricholathys monterea Chamberlin & Gertsch, 1958 – United States
- Tricholathys ovtchinnikovi Marusik, Omelko & Ponomarev, 2017 – Russia (Caucasus)
- Tricholathys relicta Ovtchinnikov, 2001 – Kyrgyzstan
- Tricholathys relictoides Wang, Peng & Zhang, 2023 – China
- Tricholathys rothi Chamberlin & Gertsch, 1958 – Canada, United States
- Tricholathys saltona Chamberlin, 1948 – United States
- Tricholathys serrata Wang, Peng & Zhang, 2023 – China
- Tricholathys spiralis Chamberlin & Ivie, 1935 – Canada, United States (type species)
- Tricholathys subnivalis (Ovtchinnikov, 1989) – Kyrgyzstan, Tajikistan
- Tricholathys xizangensis Wang, Peng & Zhang, 2023 – China
