= Masonetta =

Scientific classification
- Kingdom: Animalia
- Phylum: Arthropoda
- Subphylum: Chelicerata
- Class: Arachnida
- Order: Araneae
- Infraorder: Araneomorphae
- Family: Linyphiidae
- Genus: Masonetta; Chamberlin & Ivie, 1939
- Species: M. floridana

Binomial name
- Masonetta floridana (Ivie & Barrows, 1935)

Genus of spiders

Masonetta is a monotypic genus of North American dwarf spiders containing the single species, Masonetta floridana. It was first described by Ralph Vary Chamberlin & Vaine Wilton Ivie in 1939, and has only been found in the United States.
