= Calilena restricta =

Scientific classification
- Kingdom: Animalia
- Phylum: Arthropoda
- Subphylum: Chelicerata
- Class: Arachnida
- Order: Araneae
- Infraorder: Araneomorphae
- Family: Agelenidae
- Genus: Calilena
- Species: C. restricta

Binomial name
- Calilena restricta Chamberlin & Ivie, 1941

Species of spider

Calilena restricta is a species of funnel weaver in the family of spiders known as Agelenidae. It is found in the USA.

== Subspecies ==
These two subspecies belong to the species Calilena restricta:

- Calilena restricta dixiana Chamberlin & Ivie, 1941^{i c g}
- Calilena restricta restricta Chamberlin & Ivie, 1941^{i g}

Data sources: i = ITIS, c = Catalogue of Life, g = GBIF, b = Bugguide.net
