= Anibontes =

Scientific classification
- Kingdom: Animalia
- Phylum: Arthropoda
- Subphylum: Chelicerata
- Class: Arachnida
- Order: Araneae
- Infraorder: Araneomorphae
- Family: Linyphiidae
- Genus: Anibontes; Chamberlin, 1924

Type species
- A. mimus Chamberlin, 1924

Species
- A. longipes Chamberlin & Ivie, 1944 – USA; A. mimus Chamberlin, 1924 – USA

Genus of spiders

Anibontes is a genus of dwarf spiders native to North America, that was first described by Ralph Vary Chamberlin in 1924. As of May 2019, the genus comprises only two species, both found in the United States: A. longipes and A. mimus.
