= Disembolus =

Scientific classification
- Kingdom: Animalia
- Phylum: Arthropoda
- Subphylum: Chelicerata
- Class: Arachnida
- Order: Araneae
- Infraorder: Araneomorphae
- Family: Linyphiidae
- Genus: Disembolus; Chamberlin & Ivie, 1933

Type species
- D. stridulans Chamberlin & Ivie, 1933

Species
- 24, see text

Genus of spiders

Disembolus is a genus of North American dwarf spiders that was first described by Ralph Vary Chamberlin & Vaine Wilton Ivie in 1933.

== Species ==
As of May 2019 it contains twenty-four species:

- Disembolus alpha (Chamberlin, 1949) – USA
- Disembolus amoenus Millidge, 1981 – USA
- Disembolus anguineus Millidge, 1981 – USA
- Disembolus bairdi Edwards, 1999 – USA
- Disembolus beta Millidge, 1981 – USA
- Disembolus concinnus Millidge, 1981 – USA
- Disembolus convolutus Millidge, 1981 – USA
- Disembolus corneliae (Chamberlin & Ivie, 1944) – Canada, USA
- Disembolus galeatus Millidge, 1981 – USA
- Disembolus hyalinus Millidge, 1981 – Canada
- Disembolus implexus Millidge, 1981 – USA
- Disembolus implicatus Millidge, 1981 – USA
- Disembolus kesimbus (Chamberlin, 1949) – USA
- Disembolus lacteus Millidge, 1981 – USA
- Disembolus lacunatus Millidge, 1981 – USA
- Disembolus phanus (Chamberlin, 1949) – USA
- Disembolus procerus Millidge, 1981 – USA
- Disembolus sacerdotalis (Crosby & Bishop, 1933) – USA, Canada
- Disembolus sinuosus Millidge, 1981 – USA
- Disembolus solanus Millidge, 1981 – USA
- Disembolus stridulans Chamberlin & Ivie, 1933 (type) – USA
- Disembolus torquatus Millidge, 1981 – USA
- Disembolus vicinus Millidge, 1981 – USA
- Disembolus zygethus Chamberlin, 1949 – USA
