= Linyphantes victoria =

Scientific classification
- Kingdom: Animalia
- Phylum: Arthropoda
- Subphylum: Chelicerata
- Class: Arachnida
- Order: Araneae
- Infraorder: Araneomorphae
- Family: Linyphiidae
- Genus: Linyphantes
- Species: L. victoria

Binomial name
- Linyphantes victoria Chamberlin & Ivie, 1942

Species of spider

Linyphantes victoria is a species of sheetweb spider in the family Linyphiidae. It is found in Canada.
