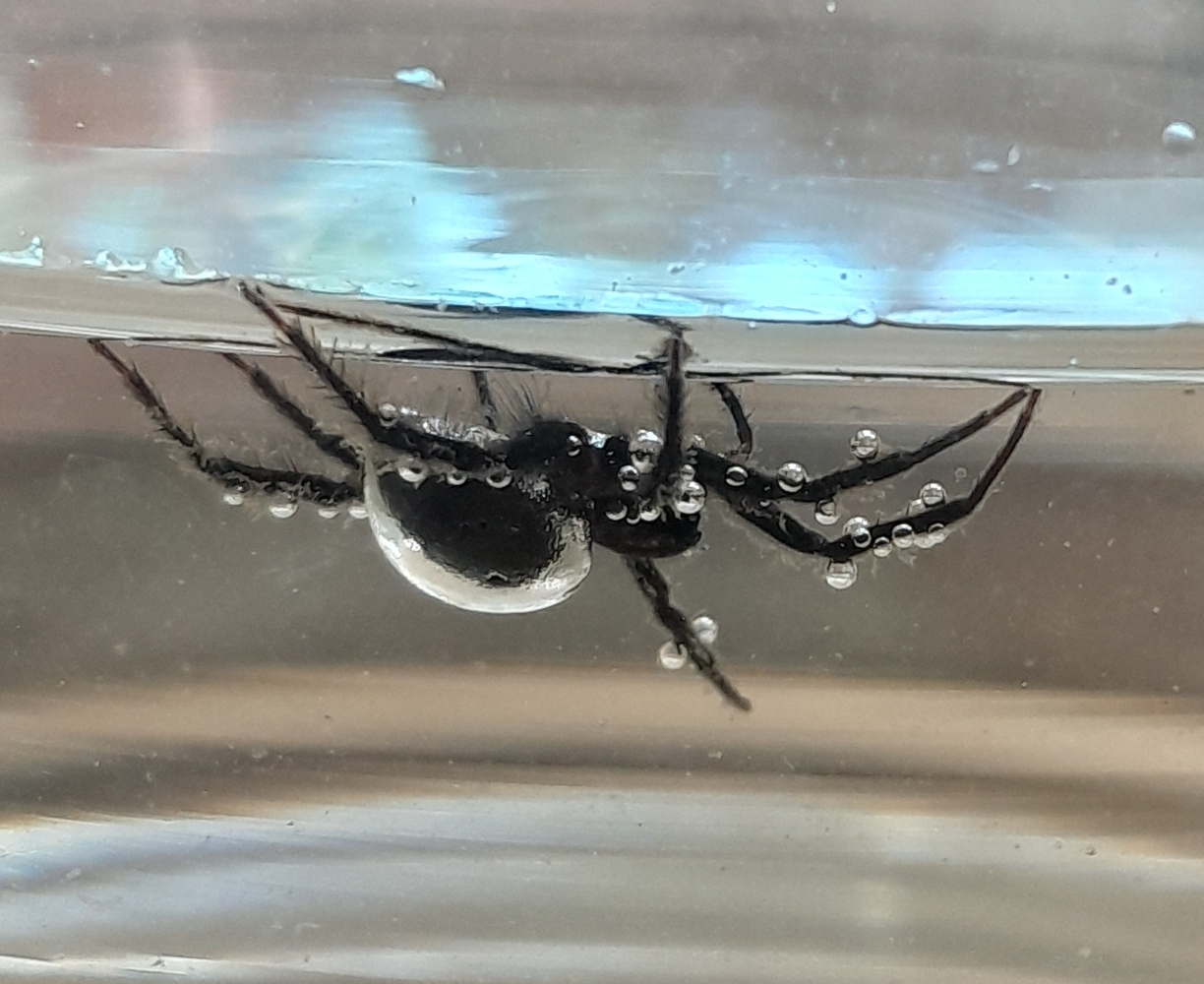
- Argyroneta aquatica
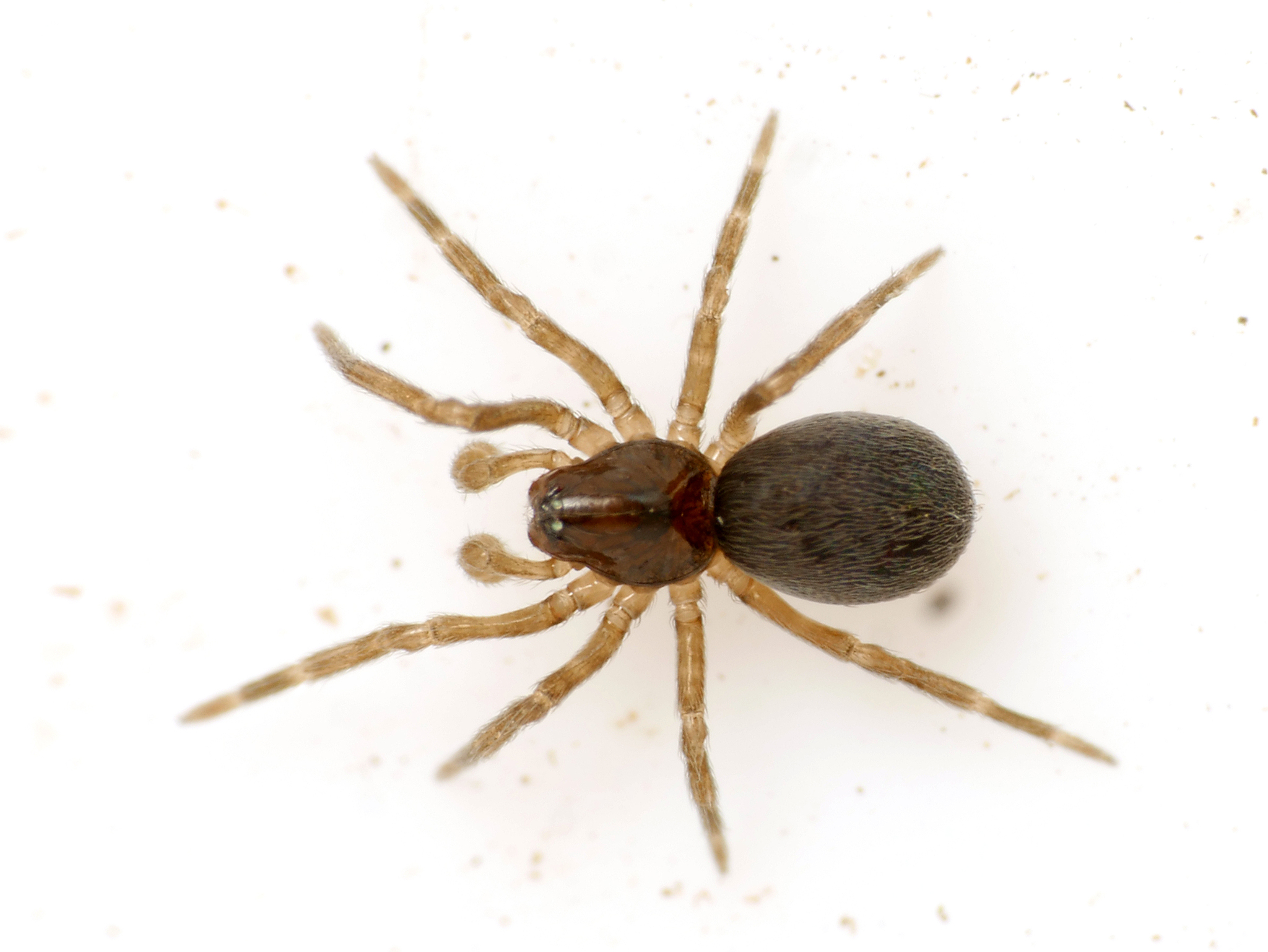
- Argenna subnigra in Denmark

Scientific classification
- Kingdom: Animalia
- Phylum: Arthropoda
- Subphylum: Chelicerata
- Class: Arachnida
- Order: Araneae
- Infraorder: Araneomorphae
- Clade: Marronoid clade
- Family: Argyronetidae; Thorell, 1869

Genera
- 12 genera, 74 species
- blue: reported countries (WSC) green: observation hotspots (iNaturalist)

= Argyronetidae =

Genus of spiders

Argyronetidae is a family of araneomorph spiders.

Although originally erected by Tamerlan Thorell in 1869, all of its genera were included in family Dictynidae until 2025, when the family was redefined by Montana et al..

Earlier attempts to separate Argyroneta into its own family were not accepted. Argyroneta probably represents its own subfamily.

== Distribution ==
Members of this family are mainly found in Asia, Europe and North Africa, with six genera found in North America. Mizaga is endemic to Senegal, and Paratheuma is found worldwide.

== Genera ==
As of October 2025, this family includes twelve genera:

- Altella Simon, 1885 – Algeria, Kazakhstan, Pakistan, Turkey, Europe
- Arctella Holm, 1945 – Mongolia, Russia, Scandinavia, Alaska, Canada
- Argenna Thorell, 1870 – Kazakhstan, Kyrgyzstan, China, Caucasus, Iran?, Russia, North America
- Argyroneta Latreille, 1804 – Europe, Asia
- Chaerea Simon, 1885 – Algeria, Greece, Italy, Spain, France
- Devade Simon, 1885 – Algeria, Asia, Ukraine, Russia, Cyprus
- Hackmania Lehtinen, 1967 – Russia, United States
- Iviella Lehtinen, 1967 – North America
- Mizaga Simon, 1898 – Senegal
- Paratheuma Bryant, 1940 – China, Japan, Korea, Iran, Hawaii, Mexico, United States, Australia, Fiji, New Zealand, Cook Islands, Caroline Islands to Samoa. Introduced to China, Japan
- Saltonia Chamberlin & Ivie, 1942 – United States
- Tricholathys Chamberlin & Ivie, 1935 – Kyrgyzstan, Tajikistan, China, Russia, North America
