= Varacosa shenandoa =

Scientific classification
- Kingdom: Animalia
- Phylum: Arthropoda
- Subphylum: Chelicerata
- Class: Arachnida
- Order: Araneae
- Infraorder: Araneomorphae
- Family: Lycosidae
- Genus: Varacosa
- Species: V. shenandoa

Binomial name
- Varacosa shenandoa (Chamberlin & Ivie, 1942)

Species of spider

Varacosa shenandoa is a species of wolf spider in the family Lycosidae. It is found in the United States and Canada.
