= Tunagyna =

Scientific classification
- Kingdom: Animalia
- Phylum: Arthropoda
- Subphylum: Chelicerata
- Class: Arachnida
- Order: Araneae
- Infraorder: Araneomorphae
- Family: Linyphiidae
- Genus: Tunagyna; Chamberlin & Ivie, 1933
- Species: T. debilis

Binomial name
- Tunagyna debilis (Banks, 1892)

Genus of spiders

Tunagyna is a monotypic genus of sheet weavers containing the single species, Tunagyna debilis. It was first described by Ralph Vary Chamberlin & Vaine Wilton Ivie in 1933, and is found in the United States, Canada, and Russia.
