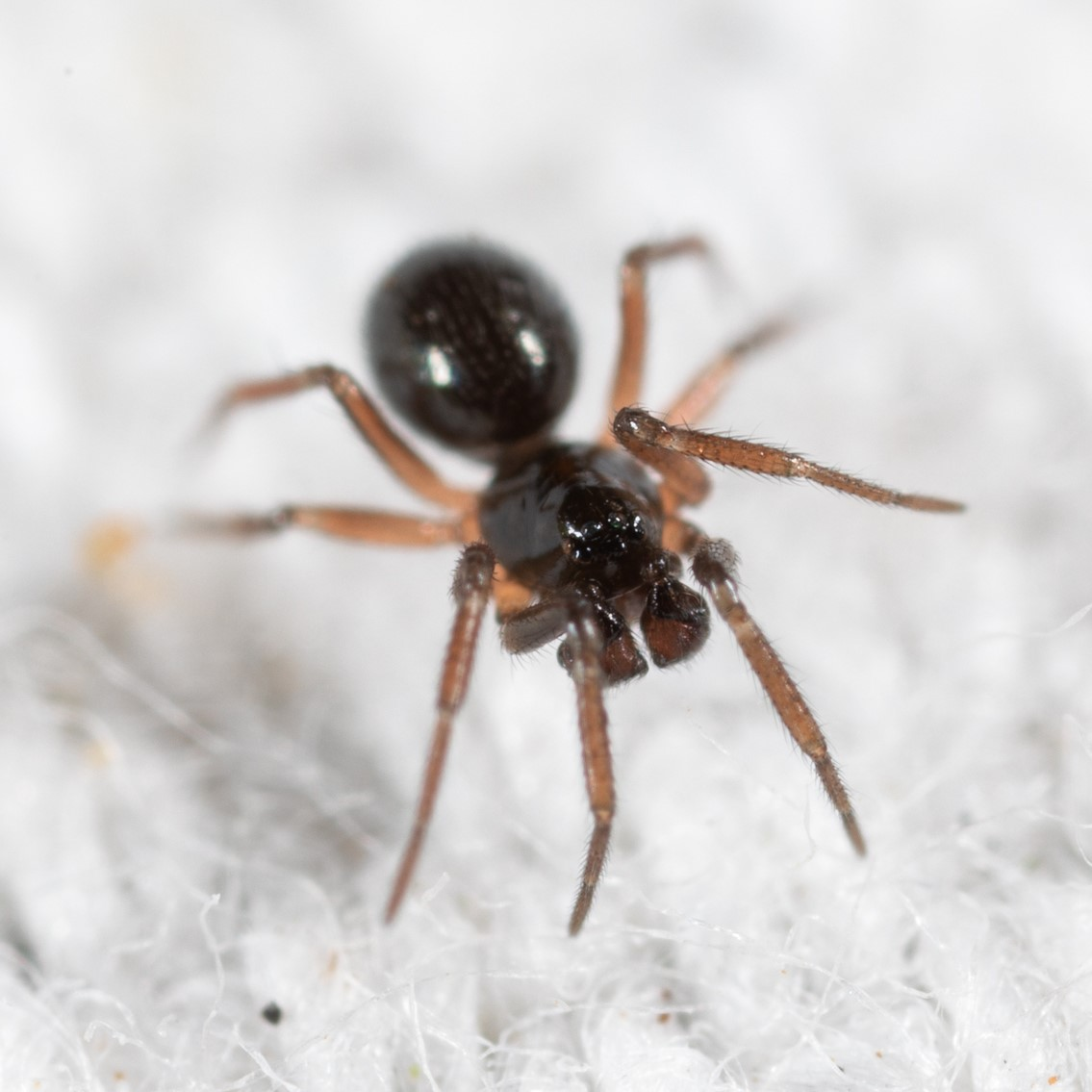

Scientific classification
- Kingdom: Animalia
- Phylum: Arthropoda
- Subphylum: Chelicerata
- Class: Arachnida
- Order: Araneae
- Infraorder: Araneomorphae
- Family: Linyphiidae
- Genus: Tachygyna
- Species: T. vancouverana

Binomial name
- Tachygyna vancouverana Chamberlin & Ivie, 1939

= Tachygyna vancouverana =

Species of spider

Tachygyna vancouverana is a species of dwarf spider in the family Linyphiidae. It is found in the Pacific Northwest of North America.
