= Eulaira =

Scientific classification
- Kingdom: Animalia
- Phylum: Arthropoda
- Subphylum: Chelicerata
- Class: Arachnida
- Order: Araneae
- Infraorder: Araneomorphae
- Family: Linyphiidae
- Genus: Eulaira; Chamberlin & Ivie, 1933

Type species
- E. dela Chamberlin & Ivie, 1933

Species
- 14, see text

Genus of spiders

Eulaira is a genus of North American dwarf spiders that was first described by Ralph Vary Chamberlin & Vaine Wilton Ivie in 1933.

== Species ==
As of May 2019 it contains fourteen species and one subspecies:

- Eulaira altura Chamberlin & Ivie, 1945 – USA
- Eulaira arctoa Holm, 1960 – USA (Alaska)
- Eulaira chelata Chamberlin & Ivie, 1939 – USA
- Eulaira dela Chamberlin & Ivie, 1933 (type) – USA
- Eulaira delana Chamberlin & Ivie, 1939 – USA
- Eulaira hidalgoana Gertsch & Davis, 1937 – Mexico
- Eulaira kaiba Chamberlin, 1949 – USA
- Eulaira mana Chamberlin & Ivie, 1935 – USA
- Eulaira obscura Chamberlin & Ivie, 1945 – USA
- Eulaira schediana Chamberlin & Ivie, 1933 – USA
  - Eulaira s. nigrescens Chamberlin & Ivie, 1945 – USA
- Eulaira simplex (Chamberlin, 1919) – USA
- Eulaira suspecta Gertsch & Mulaik, 1936 – USA
- Eulaira thumbia Chamberlin & Ivie, 1945 – USA
- Eulaira wioma Chamberlin, 1949 – USA
