= Anacornia =

Scientific classification
- Kingdom: Animalia
- Phylum: Arthropoda
- Subphylum: Chelicerata
- Class: Arachnida
- Order: Araneae
- Infraorder: Araneomorphae
- Family: Linyphiidae
- Genus: Anacornia; Chamberlin & Ivie, 1933

Type species
- A. microps Chamberlin & Ivie, 1933

Species
- A. microps Chamberlin & Ivie, 1933 – USA; A. proceps Chamberlin, 1949 – USA

Genus of spiders

Anacornia is a genus of North American dwarf spiders that was first described by Ralph Vary Chamberlin & Vaine Wilton Ivie in 1933. As of May 2019 it contains only two species, both found in the United States: A. microps and A. proceps.
