= Spirembolus phylax =

Scientific classification
- Kingdom: Animalia
- Phylum: Arthropoda
- Subphylum: Chelicerata
- Class: Arachnida
- Order: Araneae
- Infraorder: Araneomorphae
- Family: Linyphiidae
- Genus: Spirembolus
- Species: S. phylax

Binomial name
- Spirembolus phylax Chamberlin & Ivie, 1935

Species of spider

Spirembolus phylax is a species of sheet weaver found in the United States. It was described by Chamberlin & Ivie in 1935.
