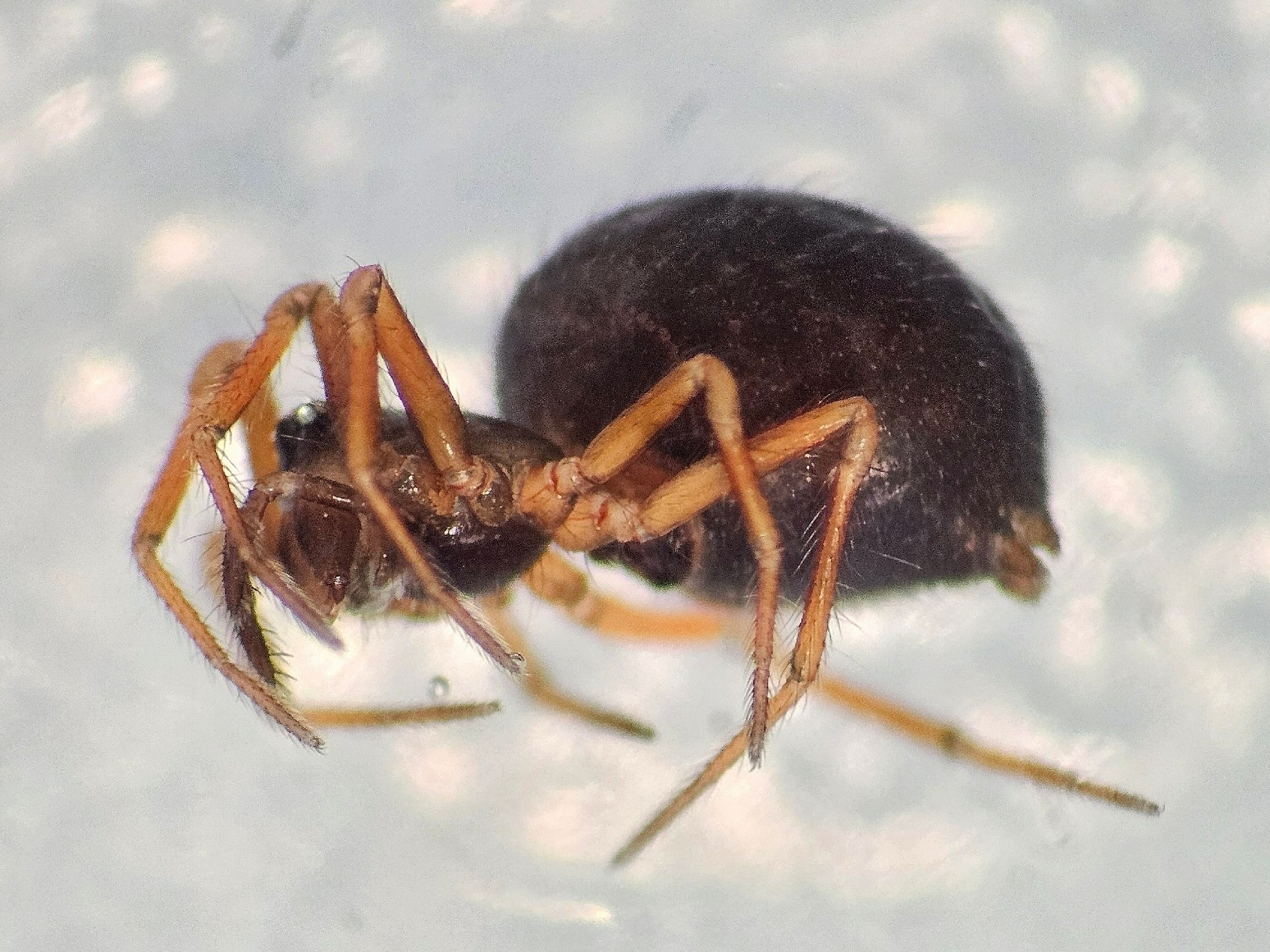
- Coloncus siou

Scientific classification
- Kingdom: Animalia
- Phylum: Arthropoda
- Subphylum: Chelicerata
- Class: Arachnida
- Order: Araneae
- Infraorder: Araneomorphae
- Family: Linyphiidae
- Genus: Coloncus; Chamberlin, 1949

Type species
- C. pius Chamberlin, 1949

Species
- 5, see text

= Coloncus =

Genus of spiders

Coloncus is a genus of North American dwarf spiders that was first described by Ralph Vary Chamberlin in 1949.

== Species ==
As of May 2019 it contains five species:

- Coloncus americanus (Chamberlin & Ivie, 1944) – USA
- Coloncus cascadeus Chamberlin, 1949 – USA
- Coloncus ocala Chamberlin, 1949 – USA
- Coloncus pius Chamberlin, 1949 (type) – USA
- Coloncus siou Chamberlin, 1949 – USA, Canada
