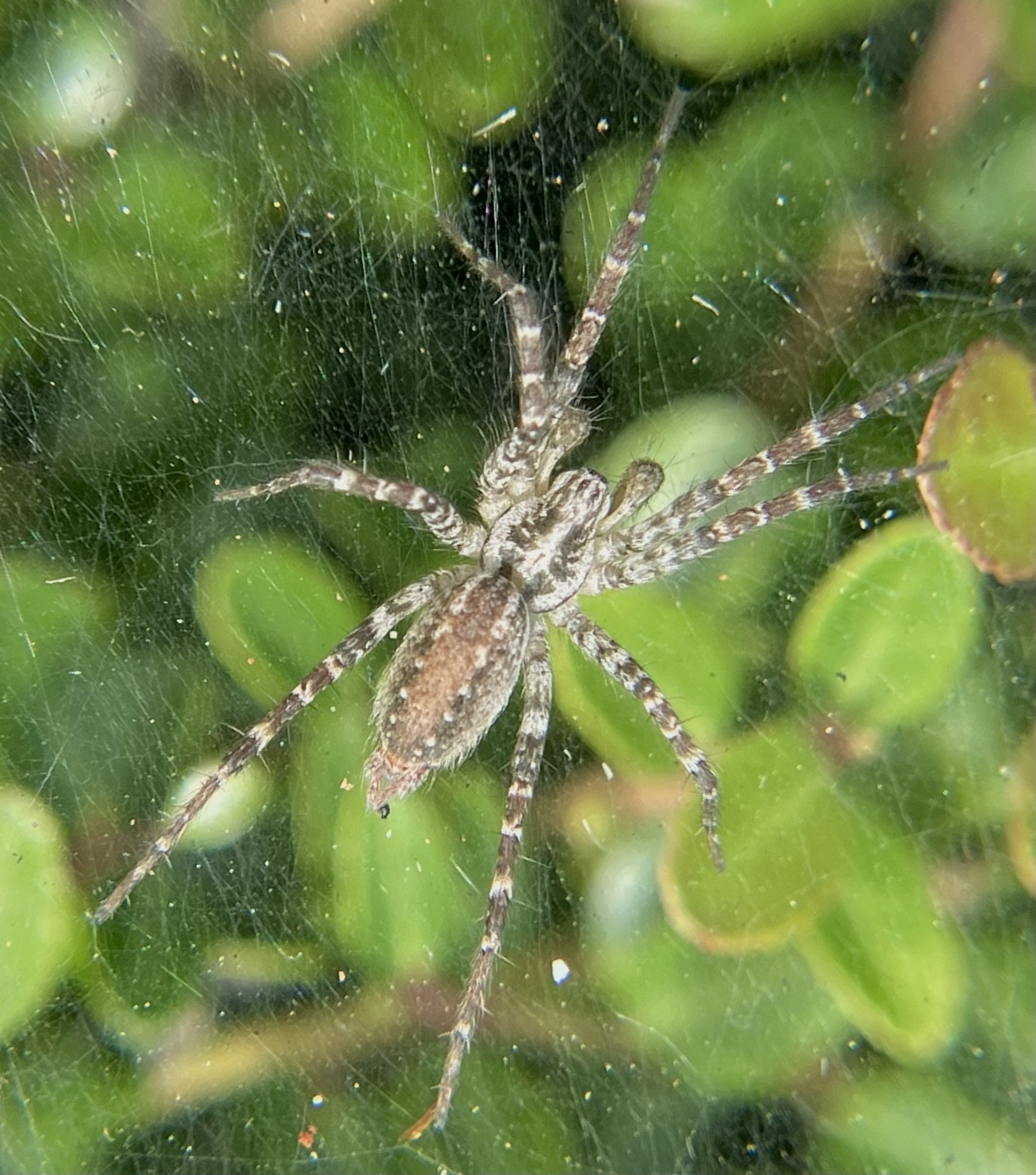
- B. texana in North Carolina, USA
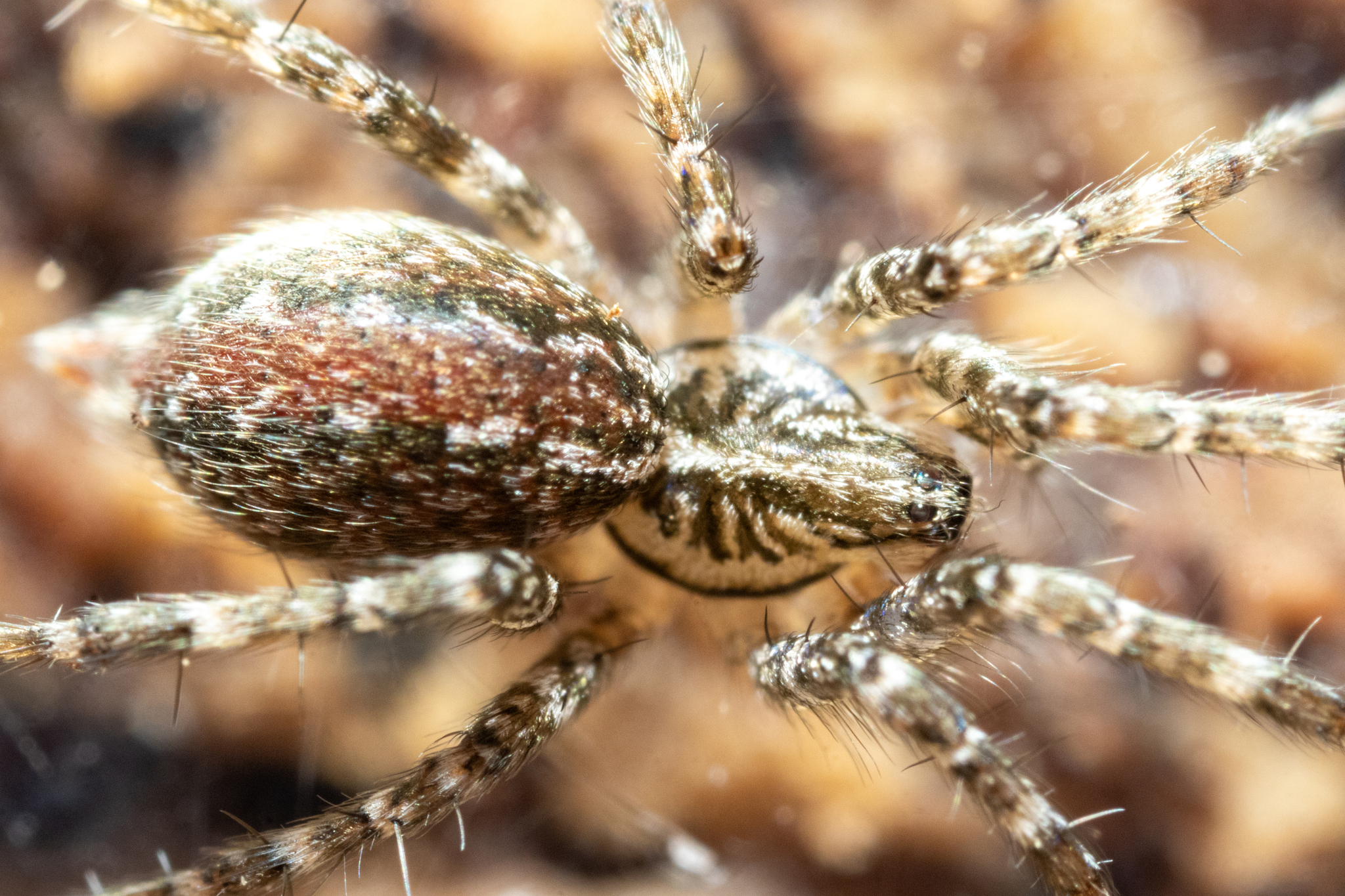
- B. stephaniae in Georga, USA

Scientific classification
- Kingdom: Animalia
- Phylum: Arthropoda
- Subphylum: Chelicerata
- Class: Arachnida
- Order: Araneae
- Infraorder: Araneomorphae
- Family: Agelenidae
- Genus: Barronopsis; Chamberlin & Ivie, 1941

Type species
- B. barrowsi (Gertsch, 1934)

Species
- 7, see text

= Barronopsis =

Genus of spiders

Barronopsis is a genus of funnel weavers first described by R. V. Chamberlin and Wilton Ivie in 1941.

== Species ==
As of October 2026 it contains seven species:

- Barronopsis arturoi Alayón, 1993 – Cuba
- Barronopsis barrowsi (Gertsch, 1934) (type) – USA, Cuba, Hispaniola
- Barronopsis floridensis (Roth, 1954) – USA, Bahama Is.
- Barronopsis jeffersi (Muma, 1945) – USA, Cuba
- Barronopsis pelempito Alayón, 2012 – Hispaniola
- Barronopsis stephaniae Stocks, 2009 – USA
- Barronopsis texana (Gertsch, 1934) – USA
