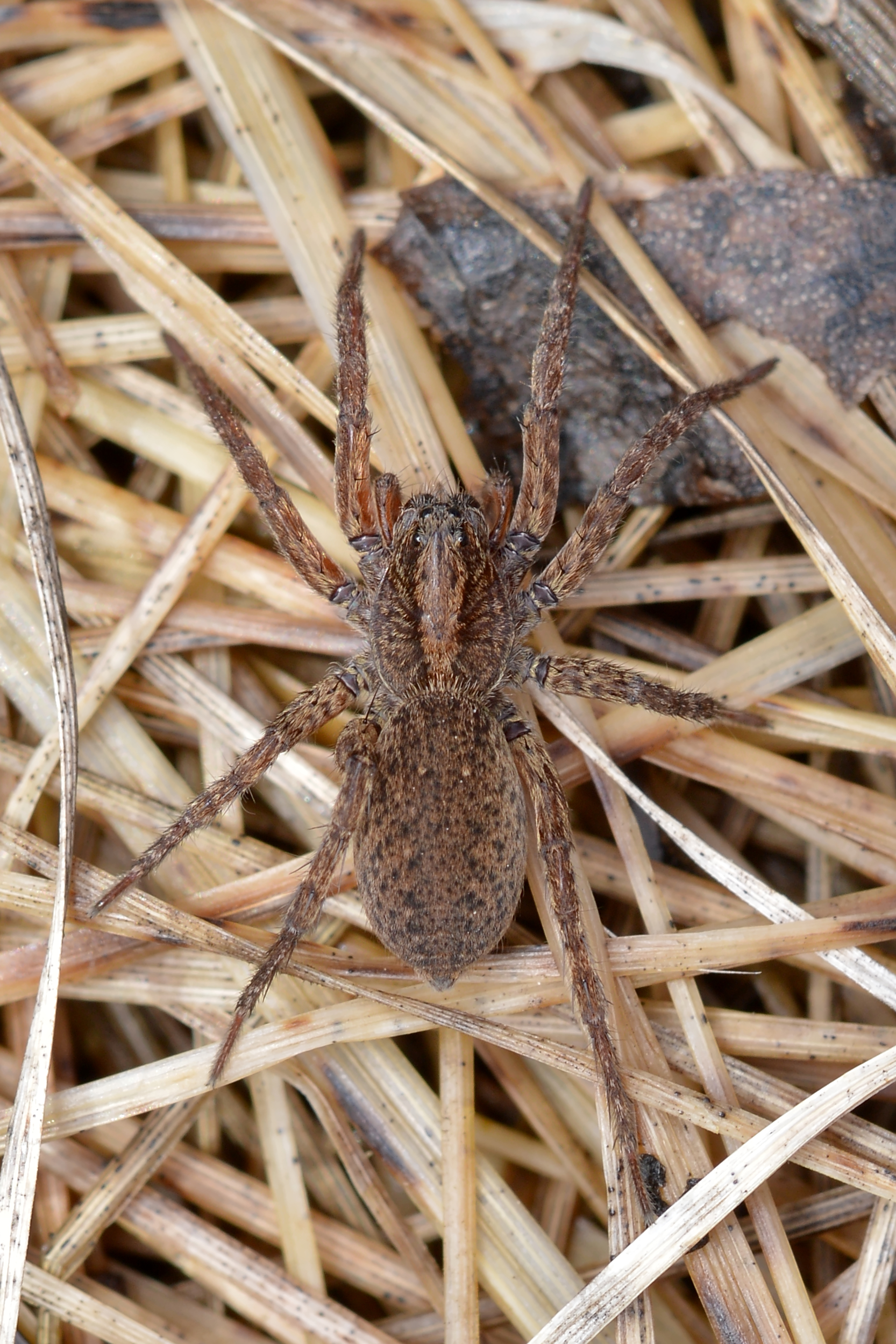
- Varacosa avara in Guelph, Ontario, Canada

Scientific classification
- Kingdom: Animalia
- Phylum: Arthropoda
- Subphylum: Chelicerata
- Class: Arachnida
- Order: Araneae
- Infraorder: Araneomorphae
- Family: Lycosidae
- Genus: Varacosa; Ivie

Species
- 6, see text

= Varacosa =

Genus of spiders

Varacosa is a genus of spiders in the family Lycosidae. It was first described in 1942 by Chamberlin & Ivie. As of 2017, it contains 6 North American species.

== Species ==
Varacosa comprises the following species:

- Varacosa apothetica (Wallace, 1947)
- Varacosa avara (Keyserling, 1877)
- Varacosa gosiuta (Chamberlin, 1908)
- Varacosa hoffmannae Jiménez & Dondale, 1988
- Varacosa parthenus (Chamberlin, 1925)
- Varacosa shenandoa (Chamberlin & Ivie, 1942)
