= Emblyna manitoba =

Scientific classification
- Kingdom: Animalia
- Phylum: Arthropoda
- Subphylum: Chelicerata
- Class: Arachnida
- Order: Araneae
- Infraorder: Araneomorphae
- Family: Dictynidae
- Genus: Emblyna
- Species: E. manitoba

Binomial name
- Emblyna manitoba (Ivie, 1947)

Species of spider

Emblyna manitoba is a species of mesh web weaver in the spider family Dictynidae. It is found in the United States and Canada.
