= Spirembolus perjucundus =

Scientific classification
- Domain: Eukaryota
- Kingdom: Animalia
- Phylum: Arthropoda
- Subphylum: Chelicerata
- Class: Arachnida
- Order: Araneae
- Infraorder: Araneomorphae
- Family: Linyphiidae
- Genus: Spirembolus
- Species: S. perjucundus

Binomial name
- Spirembolus perjucundus Crosby, 1925

Species of spider

Spirembolus perjucundus is a species of sheet weaver found in the United States. It was described by Crosby in 1925.
