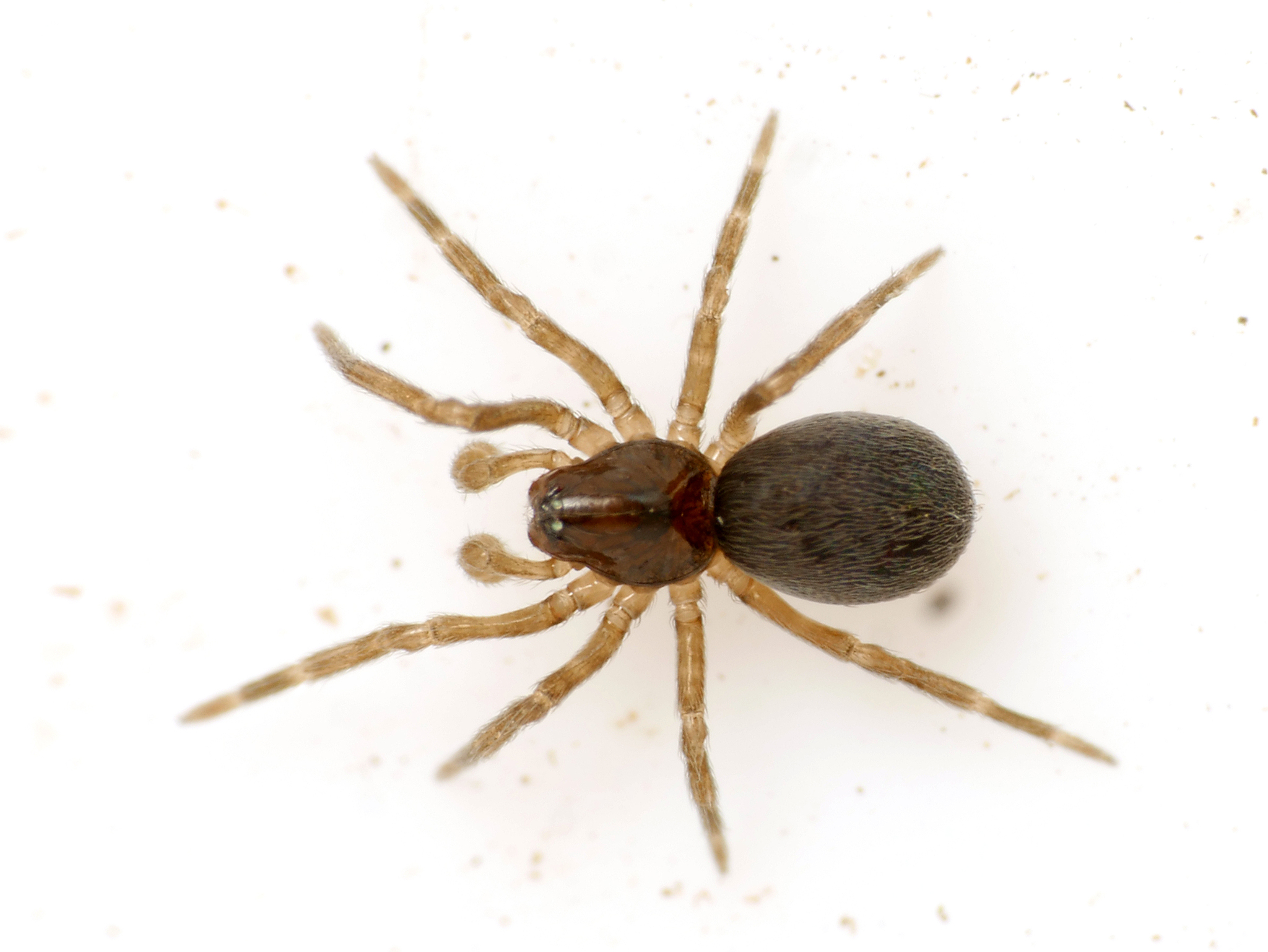
- Argenna subnigra in Denmark
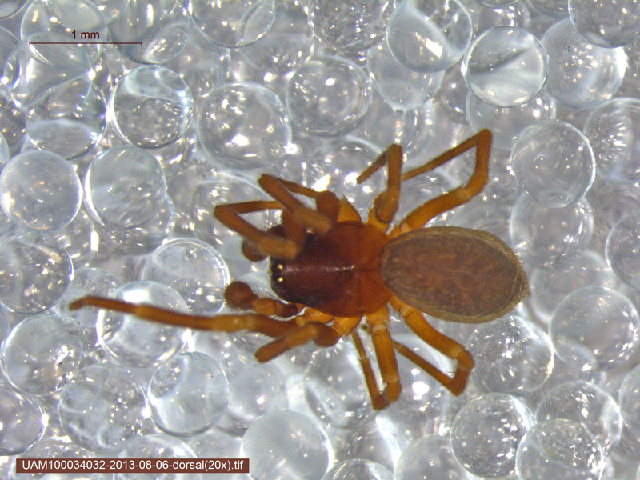
- A. obesa

Scientific classification
- Kingdom: Animalia
- Phylum: Arthropoda
- Subphylum: Chelicerata
- Class: Arachnida
- Order: Araneae
- Family: Argyronetidae
- Genus: Argenna; Thorell, 1870

Type species
- A. subnigra (O. Pickard-Cambridge, 1861)

Species
- 7, see text

= Argenna =

Argenna Temporal range: Neogene–present

Genus of spiders

Argenna is a genus of cribellate araneomorph spiders in the family Argyronetidae. It was first described by Tamerlan Thorell in 1870.

== Species ==
As of October 2025, this genus includes six species:

- Argenna obesa Emerton, 1911 – Canada, United States
- Argenna patula (Simon, 1874) – Europe, Caucasus, Russia (Europe to South Siberia), Kazakhstan, Kyrgyzstan, China, Iran?
- Argenna polita (Banks, 1898) – Mexico
- Argenna sibirica Esyunin & Stepina, 2014 – Russia (West Siberia)
- Argenna subnigra (O. Pickard-Cambridge, 1861) – Europe, Caucasus (Russia, Azerbaijan), Iran, China (type species)
- Argenna yakima Chamberlin & Gertsch, 1958 – Canada, United States
