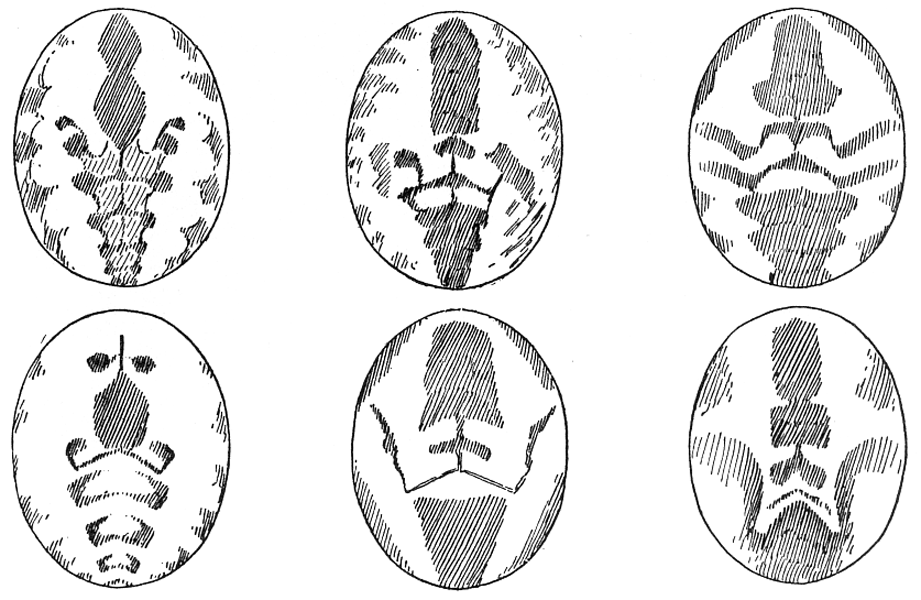

Scientific classification
- Kingdom: Animalia
- Phylum: Arthropoda
- Subphylum: Chelicerata
- Class: Arachnida
- Order: Araneae
- Infraorder: Araneomorphae
- Family: Dictynidae
- Genus: Emblyna
- Species: E. annulipes

Binomial name
- Emblyna annulipes (Blackwall, 1846)

= Emblyna annulipes =

Species of spider

Emblyna annulipes is a species of mesh web weaver in the spider family Dictynidae. It is found in North America, Europe, Turkey, Caucasus, and Russia (Far East).
