= Varacosa parthenus =

Scientific classification
- Kingdom: Animalia
- Phylum: Arthropoda
- Subphylum: Chelicerata
- Class: Arachnida
- Order: Araneae
- Infraorder: Araneomorphae
- Family: Lycosidae
- Genus: Varacosa
- Species: V. parthenus

Binomial name
- Varacosa parthenus (Chamberlin, 1925)

Species of spider

Varacosa parthenus is a species of wolf spider (Lycosidae) endemic to the Southeastern United States.
