= Spirembolus venustus =

Scientific classification
- Kingdom: Animalia
- Phylum: Arthropoda
- Subphylum: Chelicerata
- Class: Arachnida
- Order: Araneae
- Infraorder: Araneomorphae
- Family: Linyphiidae
- Genus: Spirembolus
- Species: S. venustus

Binomial name
- Spirembolus venustus Millidge, 1980

Species of spider

Spirembolus venustus is a species of sheet weaver found in the United States. It was described by Millidge in 1980.
