= Arcuphantes arcuatulus =

Scientific classification
- Domain: Eukaryota
- Kingdom: Animalia
- Phylum: Arthropoda
- Subphylum: Chelicerata
- Class: Arachnida
- Order: Araneae
- Infraorder: Araneomorphae
- Family: Linyphiidae
- Genus: Arcuphantes
- Species: A. arcuatulus

Binomial name
- Arcuphantes arcuatulus (Roewer, 1942)

Species of spider

Arcuphantes arcuatulus is a species of sheetweb spider in the family Linyphiidae. It is found in the United States and Canada.
