= Spirembolus monticolens =

Scientific classification
- Kingdom: Animalia
- Phylum: Arthropoda
- Subphylum: Chelicerata
- Class: Arachnida
- Order: Araneae
- Infraorder: Araneomorphae
- Family: Linyphiidae
- Genus: Spirembolus
- Species: S. monticolens

Binomial name
- Spirembolus monticolens Millidge, 1980

Species of spider

Spirembolus monticolens is a species of sheet weaver found in the United States and Canada. It was described by Millidge in 1980.
