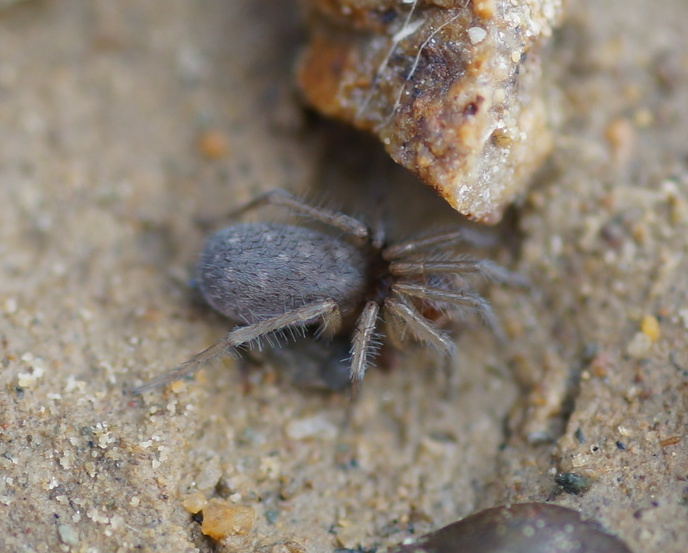
- female D. tenella
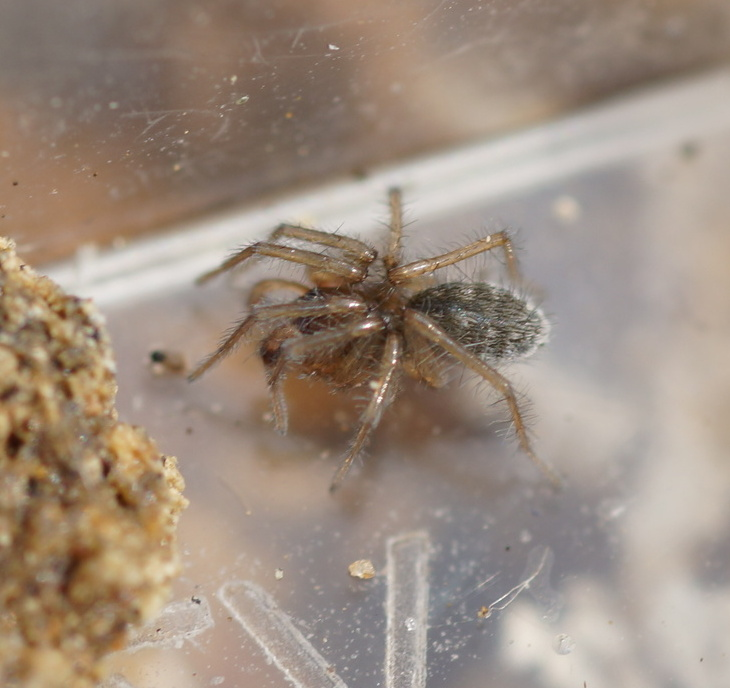
- male D. tenella

Scientific classification
- Kingdom: Animalia
- Phylum: Arthropoda
- Subphylum: Chelicerata
- Class: Arachnida
- Order: Araneae
- Infraorder: Araneomorphae
- Family: Dictynidae
- Genus: Devade; Simon, 1884

Type species
- D. indistincta (O. Pickard-Cambridge, 1872)

Species
- 14, see text

Synonyms
- Pseudauximus Denis, 1955, not Pseudauximus Simon, 1902; Strinatinella Denis, 1957

= Devade =

Genus of spiders

Devade is a genus of cribellate araneomorph spiders in the family Argyronetidae. It was first described by Eugène Simon in 1884. Originally placed with the Amaurobiidae, it was moved to the intertidal spiders in 1983, then to the Dictynidae in 1989. It was included in the re-erected family Argyronetidae in 2025.

== Species ==
As of October 2025, this genus includes fourteen species:

- Devade dubia Caporiacco, 1934 – Pakistan (Karakorum)
- Devade indistincta (O. Pickard-Cambridge, 1872) – Mediterranean (type species)
- Devade kazakhstanica Esyunin & Efimik, 2000 – Kazakhstan
- Devade lehtineni Esyunin & Efimik, 2000 – Kazakhstan
- Devade libanica (Denis, 1955) – Lebanon
- Devade longa Wang, Yang, Marusik & Zhang, 2025 – China
- Devade miniatura Zamani & Marusik, 2025 – Iran
- Devade miranda Ponomarev, 2007 – Kazakhstan
- Devade mongolica Esyunin & Marusik, 2001 – Mongolia, China
- Devade naderii Zamani & Marusik, 2017 – Iran
- Devade pulla Wang, Yang, Marusik & Zhang, 2025 – China
- Devade pusilla Simon, 1911 – Algeria
- Devade qiemuensis (Hu & Wu, 1989) – China
- Devade tenella (Tystshenko, 1965) – Cyprus, Ukraine, Armenia, Azerbaijan, Russia (Europe to West Siberia), Iran, Kazakhstan, Turkmenistan, Kyrgyzstan
