= Spirembolus fasciatus =

Scientific classification
- Domain: Eukaryota
- Kingdom: Animalia
- Phylum: Arthropoda
- Subphylum: Chelicerata
- Class: Arachnida
- Order: Araneae
- Infraorder: Araneomorphae
- Family: Linyphiidae
- Genus: Spirembolus
- Species: S. fasciatus

Binomial name
- Spirembolus fasciatus (Banks, 1904)

Species of spider

Spirembolus fasciatus is a species of sheet weavers found in the United States. It was described by Banks in 1904.
