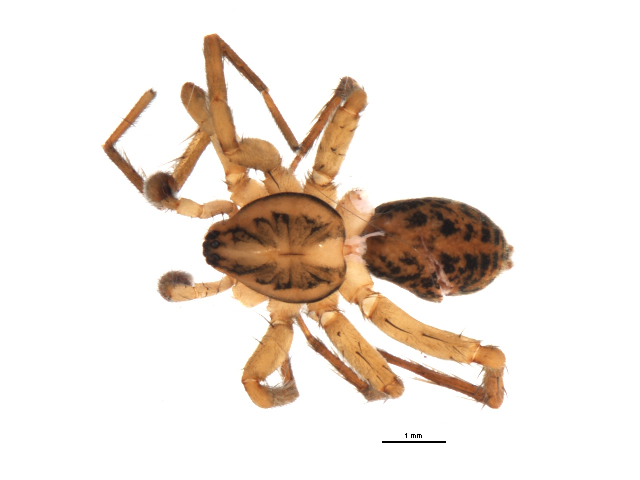
- A. pratensis, adult male

Conservation status
- Secure (NatureServe)

Scientific classification
- Kingdom: Animalia
- Phylum: Arthropoda
- Subphylum: Chelicerata
- Class: Arachnida
- Order: Araneae
- Infraorder: Araneomorphae
- Family: Liocranidae
- Genus: Agroeca
- Species: A. pratensis

Binomial name
- Agroeca pratensis Emerton, 1890

= Agroeca pratensis =

Species of spider

Agroeca pratensis is a species of liocranid sac spider in the family Liocranidae. It is found in the United States and Canada.
