= Spirembolus elevatus =

Scientific classification
- Domain: Eukaryota
- Kingdom: Animalia
- Phylum: Arthropoda
- Subphylum: Chelicerata
- Class: Arachnida
- Order: Araneae
- Infraorder: Araneomorphae
- Family: Linyphiidae
- Genus: Spirembolus
- Species: S. elevatus

Binomial name
- Spirembolus elevatus Millidge, 1980

Species of spider

Spirembolus elevatus is a species of sheet weaver found in the United States. It was described by Millidge in 1980.
