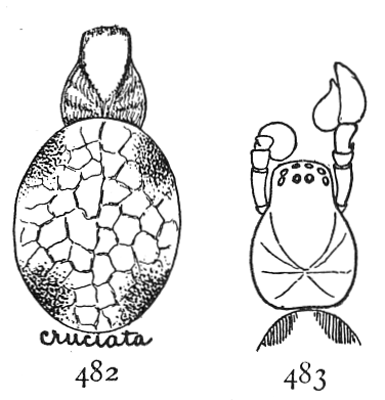

Scientific classification
- Kingdom: Animalia
- Phylum: Arthropoda
- Subphylum: Chelicerata
- Class: Arachnida
- Order: Araneae
- Infraorder: Araneomorphae
- Family: Dictynidae
- Genus: Emblyna
- Species: E. cruciata

Binomial name
- Emblyna cruciata (Emerton, 1888)

= Emblyna cruciata =

Species of spider

Emblyna cruciata is a species of mesh web weaver in the family Dictynidae. It is found in the USA and Canada.
