= Barronopsis jeffersi =

Scientific classification
- Kingdom: Animalia
- Phylum: Arthropoda
- Subphylum: Chelicerata
- Class: Arachnida
- Order: Araneae
- Infraorder: Araneomorphae
- Family: Agelenidae
- Genus: Barronopsis
- Species: B. jeffersi

Binomial name
- Barronopsis jeffersi (Muma, 1945)

Species of spider

Barronopsis jeffersi is a species of spider from the genus Barronopsis. It was first described by Muma in 1945.
