= Agroeca trivittata =

Scientific classification
- Domain: Eukaryota
- Kingdom: Animalia
- Phylum: Arthropoda
- Subphylum: Chelicerata
- Class: Arachnida
- Order: Araneae
- Infraorder: Araneomorphae
- Family: Liocranidae
- Genus: Agroeca
- Species: A. trivittata

Binomial name
- Agroeca trivittata (Keyserling, 1887)

Species of spider

Agroeca trivittata is a species of liocranid sac spider in the family Liocranidae. It is found in the United States.
