= Spirembolus vallicolens =

Scientific classification
- Domain: Eukaryota
- Kingdom: Animalia
- Phylum: Arthropoda
- Subphylum: Chelicerata
- Class: Arachnida
- Order: Araneae
- Infraorder: Araneomorphae
- Family: Linyphiidae
- Genus: Spirembolus
- Species: S. vallicolens

Binomial name
- Spirembolus vallicolens Chamberlin, 1920

Species of spider

Spirembolus vallicolens is a species of sheet weaver found in North America. It was described by Chamberlin in 1920.
