= Spirembolus =

Scientific classification
- Kingdom: Animalia
- Phylum: Arthropoda
- Subphylum: Chelicerata
- Class: Arachnida
- Order: Araneae
- Infraorder: Araneomorphae
- Family: Linyphiidae
- Genus: Spirembolus; Chamberlin, 1920

Type species
- S. monticolens (Chamberlin, 1919)

Species
- 41, see text

Synonyms
- Bactroceps Chamberlin & Ivie, 1945; Tortembolus Crosby, 1925

Genus of spiders

Spirembolus is a genus of North American sheet weavers that was first described by Ralph Vary Chamberlin in 1920.

== Species ==
As of May 2019 it contains forty-one species, found in Mexico, Canada, and the United States:

- Spirembolus abnormis Millidge, 1980 – USA, Canada
- Spirembolus approximatus (Chamberlin, 1949) – USA
- Spirembolus bilobatus (Chamberlin & Ivie, 1945) – USA
- Spirembolus cheronus Chamberlin, 1949 – USA
- Spirembolus chilkatensis (Chamberlin & Ivie, 1947) – USA
- Spirembolus demonologicus (Crosby, 1925) – USA
- Spirembolus dispar Millidge, 1980 – USA
- Spirembolus elevatus Millidge, 1980 – USA
- Spirembolus erratus Millidge, 1980 – USA
- Spirembolus falcatus Millidge, 1980 – USA
- Spirembolus fasciatus (Banks, 1904) – USA
- Spirembolus fuscus Millidge, 1980 – USA
- Spirembolus hibernus Millidge, 1980 – USA
- Spirembolus humilis Millidge, 1980 – USA
- Spirembolus latebricola Millidge, 1980 – USA
- Spirembolus levis Millidge, 1980 – USA, Mexico
- Spirembolus maderus Chamberlin, 1949 – USA
- Spirembolus mendax Millidge, 1980 – USA
- Spirembolus mirus Millidge, 1980 – USA
- Spirembolus monicus (Chamberlin, 1949) – USA
- Spirembolus monticolens (Chamberlin, 1919) (type) – USA, Canada
- Spirembolus montivagus Millidge, 1980 – USA
- Spirembolus mundus Chamberlin & Ivie, 1933 – USA, Canada
- Spirembolus novellus Millidge, 1980 – USA
- Spirembolus oreinoides Chamberlin, 1949 – USA, Canada
- Spirembolus pachygnathus Chamberlin & Ivie, 1935 – USA
- Spirembolus pallidus Chamberlin & Ivie, 1935 – USA
- Spirembolus perjucundus Crosby, 1925 – USA
- Spirembolus phylax Chamberlin & Ivie, 1935 – USA
- Spirembolus praelongus Millidge, 1980 – USA
- Spirembolus prominens Millidge, 1980 – USA, Canada
- Spirembolus proximus Millidge, 1980 – USA
- Spirembolus pusillus Millidge, 1980 – USA
- Spirembolus redondo (Chamberlin & Ivie, 1945) – USA
- Spirembolus spirotubus (Banks, 1895) – USA, Canada
- Spirembolus synopticus Crosby, 1925 – USA
- Spirembolus tiogensis Millidge, 1980 – USA
- Spirembolus tortuosus (Crosby, 1925) – USA
- Spirembolus vallicolens Chamberlin, 1920 – USA
- Spirembolus venustus Millidge, 1980 – USA
- Spirembolus whitneyanus Chamberlin & Ivie, 1935 – USA
