= Barronopsis barrowsi =

Scientific classification
- Domain: Eukaryota
- Kingdom: Animalia
- Phylum: Arthropoda
- Subphylum: Chelicerata
- Class: Arachnida
- Order: Araneae
- Infraorder: Araneomorphae
- Family: Agelenidae
- Genus: Barronopsis
- Species: B. barrowsi

Binomial name
- Barronopsis barrowsi (Gertsch, 1934)

Species of spider

Barronopsis barrowsi is a species of funnel weaver in the spider family Agelenidae. It is found in Canada, the United States, the Bahamas and Hispaniola.
