= Iviella =

Scientific classification
- Kingdom: Animalia
- Phylum: Arthropoda
- Subphylum: Chelicerata
- Class: Arachnida
- Order: Araneae
- Family: Argyronetidae
- Genus: Iviella; Lehtinen, 1967

Type species
- I. ohioensis (Chamberlin & Ivie, 1935)

Species
- I. newfoundlandensis Pickavance & Dondale, 2010; I. ohioensis (Chamberlin & Ivie, 1935); I. reclusa (Gertsch & Ivie, 1936)

Genus of spiders

Iviella is a genus of North American cribellate araneomorph spiders in the family Argyronetidae. It was first described by Pekka T. Lehtinen in 1967.

== Species ==
As of October 2025, this genus includes three species:

- Iviella newfoundlandensis Pickavance & Dondale, 2010 – Canada
- Iviella ohioensis (Chamberlin & Ivie, 1935) – United States (type species)
- Iviella reclusa (Gertsch & Ivie, 1936) – Canada, United States
