= Spirembolus maderus =

Scientific classification
- Kingdom: Animalia
- Phylum: Arthropoda
- Subphylum: Chelicerata
- Class: Arachnida
- Order: Araneae
- Infraorder: Araneomorphae
- Family: Linyphiidae
- Genus: Spirembolus
- Species: S. maderus

Binomial name
- Spirembolus maderus Chamberlin, 1949

Species of spider

Spirembolus maderus is a species of sheet weaver found in the United States. It was described by Chamberlin in 1949.
