= Agroeca minuta =

Scientific classification
- Domain: Eukaryota
- Kingdom: Animalia
- Phylum: Arthropoda
- Subphylum: Chelicerata
- Class: Arachnida
- Order: Araneae
- Infraorder: Araneomorphae
- Family: Liocranidae
- Genus: Agroeca
- Species: A. minuta

Binomial name
- Agroeca minuta Banks, 1895

Species of spider

Agroeca minuta is a species of liocranid sac spider in the family Liocranidae. It is found in the United States.
