= Spirembolus oreinoides =

Scientific classification
- Kingdom: Animalia
- Phylum: Arthropoda
- Subphylum: Chelicerata
- Class: Arachnida
- Order: Araneae
- Infraorder: Araneomorphae
- Family: Linyphiidae
- Genus: Spirembolus
- Species: S. oreinoides

Binomial name
- Spirembolus oreinoides Chamberlin, 1949

Species of spider

Spirembolus oreinoides is a species of sheet weaver found in the United States and Canada. It was described by Chamberlin in 1949.
