= Barronopsis floridensis =

Scientific classification
- Domain: Eukaryota
- Kingdom: Animalia
- Phylum: Arthropoda
- Subphylum: Chelicerata
- Class: Arachnida
- Order: Araneae
- Infraorder: Araneomorphae
- Family: Agelenidae
- Genus: Barronopsis
- Species: B. floridensis

Binomial name
- Barronopsis floridensis (Roth, 1954)

Species of spider

Barronopsis floridensis is a species of funnel weaver in the spider family Agelenidae. It is found in the United States and Bahama Islands.
