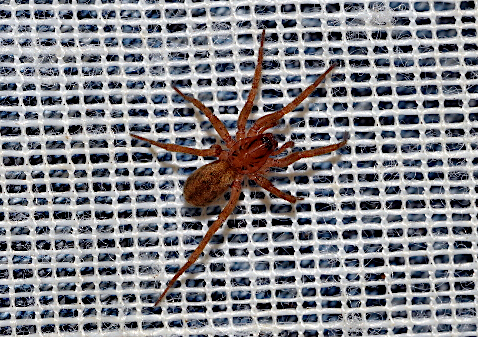

Scientific classification
- Domain: Eukaryota
- Kingdom: Animalia
- Phylum: Arthropoda
- Subphylum: Chelicerata
- Class: Arachnida
- Order: Araneae
- Infraorder: Araneomorphae
- Family: Liocranidae
- Genus: Agroeca
- Species: A. proxima

Binomial name
- Agroeca proxima (Pickard-Cambridge, 1871)

= Agroeca proxima =

Species of spider

Agroeca proxima is a species of spider belonging to the family Liocranidae.

It is native to Europe.
