= Mizaga =

Scientific classification
- Kingdom: Animalia
- Phylum: Arthropoda
- Subphylum: Chelicerata
- Class: Arachnida
- Order: Araneae
- Family: Argyronetidae
- Genus: Mizaga; Simon, 1898

Type species
- M. chevreuxi Simon, 1898

Species
- M. chevreuxi Simon, 1898; M. racovitzai (Fage, 1909)

Synonyms
- Desidiopsis Fage, 1909; Halocryphoeca Caporiacco, 1934

Genus of spiders

Mizaga is a genus of West African cribellate araneomorph spiders in the family Argyronetidae. It was first described by Eugène Simon in 1898.

Originally placed with the funnel weavers, it was moved to Dictynidae in 1967 and to Argyronetidae in 2025.

== Species ==
As of October 2025, this genus includes two species:

- Mizaga chevreuxi Simon, 1898 – Senegal (type species)
- Mizaga racovitzai (Fage, 1909) – Mediterranean
