= Varacosa avara =

Scientific classification
- Kingdom: Animalia
- Phylum: Arthropoda
- Subphylum: Chelicerata
- Class: Arachnida
- Order: Araneae
- Infraorder: Araneomorphae
- Family: Lycosidae
- Genus: Varacosa
- Species: V. avara

Binomial name
- Varacosa avara (Keyserling, 1877)

Species of spider

Varacosa avara is a species of wolf spider (Lycosidae) found in the United States and Canada.
