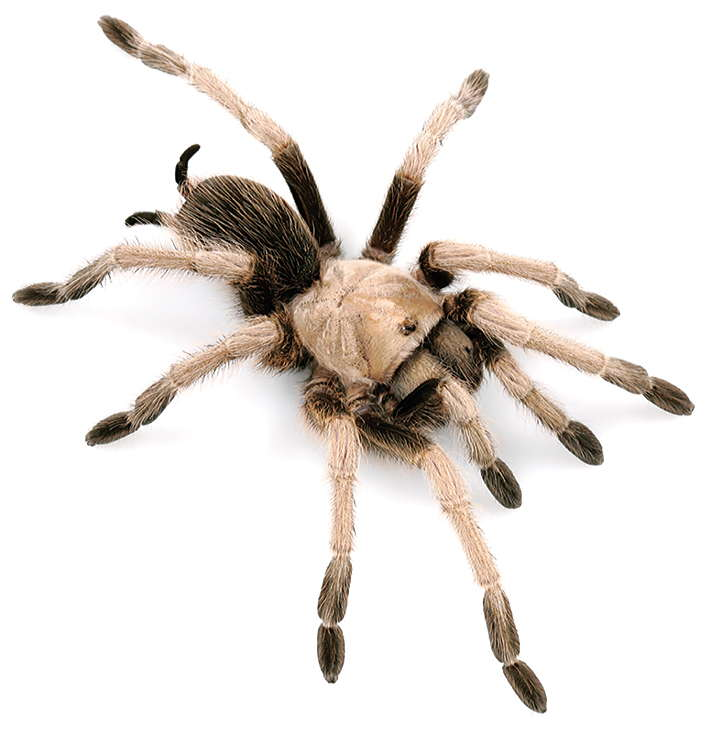
- Female
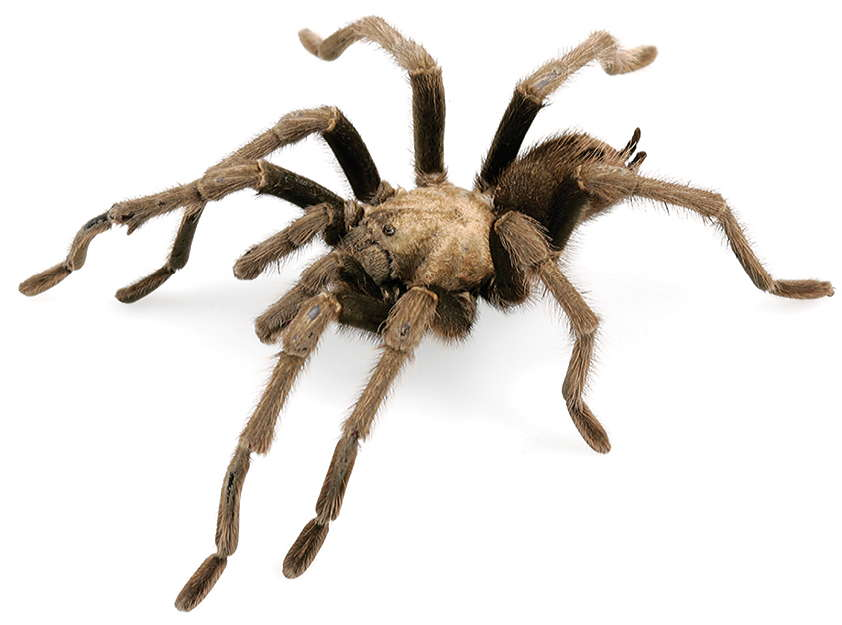
- Male

Scientific classification
- Domain: Eukaryota
- Kingdom: Animalia
- Phylum: Arthropoda
- Subphylum: Chelicerata
- Class: Arachnida
- Order: Araneae
- Infraorder: Mygalomorphae
- Family: Theraphosidae
- Genus: Aphonopelma
- Species: A. iodius

Binomial name
- Aphonopelma iodius (Chamberlin & Ivie, 1939)

Synonyms
- Delopelma iodius Chamberlin & Ivie, 1939; Delopelma melanius Chamberlin & Ivie, 1939; Aphonopelma angusi Chamberlin, 1940; Aphonopelma brunnium (Chamberlin, 1940); Aphonopelma brunnius Chamberlin, 1940; Aphonopelma chamberlini Smith, 1995; Aphonopelma iodium (Chamberlin & Ivie, 1939); Aphonopelma iviei Smith, 1995; Aphonopelma lithodomum Chamberlin, 1940; Aphonopelma melanium (Chamberlin & Ivie, 1939); Aphonopelma nevadanum Chamberlin, 1940; Aphonopelma smithi Smith, 1995; Aphonopelma zionis Chamberlin, 1940; Gosipelma angusi (Chamberlin, 1940); Gosipelma zionis (Chamberlin, 1940)

= Aphonopelma iodius =

Species of tarantula native to the United States

Aphonopelma iodius is a species of spider in the tarantula family Theraphosidae, found in United States (California, Nevada, Arizona and Utah). A 1997 paper combined it with three other previously described species (A. angusi, A. melanium, and A. nevadanum) into a single species, calling it "A. iodium". However, iodius is a neuter comparative adjective and is the correct form. Aphonopelma smithii has also been synonymized with A. iodius. A. iodius is common in the Mojave Desert to the west of the Colorado River.

== Taxonomy ==
The taxonomy of Aphonopelma is complex and has been revised many times. The formerly recognized A. melanium, A. angusi, and A. nevadanum were found to be in synonymy with, and were folded into, A. iodius. In the same study two new species, A. joshua and A. mojave, were also recognized as geographically and phenotypically distinct.

Aphonopelma smithi, also known as the Bay Area blond tarantula, is regarded by some sources as an endemic spider to Northern California, found in California interior chaparral and woodlands habitats. A 2016 study of Aphonopelma species found in the United States concluded that morphological and molecular analyses failed to distinguish A. smithi (among other species) from A. iodius, and so reduced it to a synonym. The synonymy was accepted by the World Spider Catalog, as of January 2021.

== Natural habitat ==
A. iodius lives in webbed burrows under the surface of desert areas of California, Nevada, and Utah. They often obstruct the entrance to their burrows with a silken or silk and dirt plug to protect against heat and predators.

== Mating ==
Male A. iodius reach sexual maturity at around seven years of age. In autumn, mature males prepare to mate. They transfer their sperm to sacs located in their pedipalps, then leave their burrows in search of a female. When a male finds a female's burrow, he taps the ground and vibrates. The female then emerges and the two mate, with the female receiving the sperm in her spermatheca. Males die at the end of the mating season in mid-autumn. Females lay eggs the following spring or summer.

== In captivity ==
In the pet trade A. iodius is known by many names, such as the Great Basin blonde, Fresno County blonde, desert tarantula, Salt Lake City brown, northern blonde. The species is harder to find in the tarantula trade than many of the more colorful species, but can still be purchased at a slight premium. Females can live for over thirty years in captivity.
