= B. J. Kaston =

American arachnologist (1906–1985)

Benjamin Julian Kaston (July 2, 1906 – August 24, 1985) was an American arachnologist.

Kaston was born in New York City and graduated from North Carolina State University in 1930. In 1934, he earned a PhD in zoology from Yale University, where he first began studying spiders. After graduating from Yale, Kaston worked for four years at the Connecticut Experiment Station studying elm beetles and Dutch elm disease. In his spare time, he studied spiders and published several papers on them. In 1938, he obtained a teaching position at Brenau College in Gainesville, Georgia, a small liberal arts college for women. In 1941, Kaston completed his first book, Spiders of Connecticut. Its publication was delayed for seven years, however, due to World War II.

After a summer research fellowship at Harvard University, Kaston joined the faculty of the Zoology Department of Syracuse University in 1945. He only stayed at Syracuse for one year, however, before accepting a position at Teachers College of Connecticut (now Central Connecticut State University). While at Teachers College, he wrote and published his second book, How to Know the Spiders (1953). Kaston retired from Teachers College in July 1963. In addition to his books, Kaston also published 86 scientific papers, mostly about spiders. Kaston continued writing until shortly before his death in 1985.
