= Wilton Ivie =

American arachnologist

- Born: Vaine Wilton Ivie; March 28, 1907; Eureka, Utah, U.S.
- Died: August 8, 1969 (aged 62); Kansas, U.S.
- Education: University of Utah
- Children: Larry Ivie
- Scientific career
- Fields: Arachnology
- Workplaces: University of Utah
- Academic advisors: Ralph Vary Chamberlin

Vaine Wilton Ivie (March 28, 1907 – August 8, 1969) was an American arachnologist, who described hundreds of new species and many new genera of spiders, both under his own name and in collaboration with Ralph Vary Chamberlin. He was employed by the American Museum of Natural History in New York. He also was a supporter of the Technocracy movement.

== Biography ==
Wilton Ivie was born in Eureka, Utah on March 28, 1907. He attended the University of Utah earning a BSc in 1930 and an MSc in 1932, working under Ralph V. Chamberlin. He remained at Utah as an instructor in zoology from 1932 to 1947, during which time he continued to work on spiders.

For the last nine years of his life he worked at the American Museum of Natural History. He died as a result of an auto accident in Kansas on 8 August 1969, during an expedition for the American Museum of Natural History.

== Taxonomic works ==
Ivie published many texts of information on spiders, often with Chamberlin, for example, New tarantulas from the southwestern states, 1939, and New spiders from Mexico and Panama, in which species described or mentioned include Aphonopelma iodius, Aphonopelma moderatum, Aphonopelma radinum, Aphonopelma vorhiesi and Brachypelma embrithes.

Other works:

- The Scientific Attitude
- Some New Spiders from Ohio (five species described).
- Journal of the New York Entomological Society 1967 New York Entomological Society by Wilton Ivie: New synonyms of one genus and twenty-four species, as well as twenty-one new combinations and a few other notes pertaining to American spiders, most of them in the family Linyphiidae, particularly the sub-family Erigoninae, are recorded.
- Man and the Nature of Things: Wilton Ivie 1954

== Technocracy movement ==
He was a member of Technocracy from 1937, serving on the staff at CHQ as Director of Publications. He was the author of Comments on the News which appeared monthly in Technocratic Trendevents, and wrote numerous articles, some under the pseudonym Techno Critic, in addition to the numerous articles under his own name.

== Taxa named in his honor ==
- Iviella Lehtinen, 1967
- Aphonopelma iviei Smith, 1995 – now a synonym of Aphonopelma iodius
