= Biblioteca Civica =

Biblioteca Civica may refer to one of the following public libraries in Italy:

- Biblioteca Civica di Belluno, in Palazzo Crepadona, Belluno
- Biblioteca Civica Angelo Mai, Bergamo
- Biblioteca Civica Queriniana, Brescia
- Biblioteca Civica Brugherio, Palazzo Ghirlanda-Silva, Brugherio
- Biblioteca Civica Romolo Spezioli, Fermo
- Biblioteca Civica Berio, Genoa
- Biblioteca Civica di Padova, Padua
- Biblioteca Civica Gambalunga, Rimini
- Biblioteca Civica Girolamo Tartarotti, Rovereto
- Biblioteca Civica Centrale, Turin
- Biblioteca Civica Bertoliana, Vicenza
