= Civica =

Civica may refer to:

== Organization ==
- CIVICA: The European University of Social Sciences
- Civica (company): an international software business group

== People ==
- Marcus Vettulenus Civica Barbarus, Roman senator
- Gaius Vettulenus Civica Cerealis (died 88), Roman senator
- Sextus Vettulenus Civica Cerialis, Roman senator

== Species ==
- Brigittea civica, species of spider
- Gibbovalva civica, species of moth

== Other uses ==
- Arena Civica, stadium in Italy
- Banca Civica, Spanish bank
- Biblioteca Civica, multiple libraries in Italy
- Credencial Cívica, Uruguayan official document that identifies citizens authorized to vote
- Pinacoteca Civica di Forlì, Italian art gallery
- Unión Cívica Democrática, network of forty Honduran activist organizations
