= Publio =

Publio (masculine) and Publia (feminine) are Italian and Spanish given names, derived from the Latin praenomen Publius. The Portuguese spellings are Públio and Públia. Notable people with the name include:

== Masculine forms ==
- Publio Fausto Andrelini (c. 1462–1518), Italian humanist poet
- Publio Fiori (1938–2024), Italian politician
- Marco Publio Fontana (1548–1609), Italian Renaissance humanist and poet
- Publio Morbiducci (1889–1963), Italian sculptor and designer
- Publio Maria Sant (1779–1864), Maltese bishop

== Feminine forms ==
- Públia Hortênsia de Castro (1548–1595), Portuguese scholar and humanist
- Publia Fulvia Plautilla (died 211), wife of the Roman emperor Caracalla

== See also ==
- Scipione (opera), also called Publio Cornelio Scipione, an opera seria, composed by George Frideric Handel
- Ficimia publia, a species of colubrid snake
