= 1764 =

1764 in various calendars
- Gregorian calendar: 1764; MDCCLXIV
- Ab urbe condita: 2517
- Armenian calendar: 1213; ԹՎ ՌՄԺԳ
- Assyrian calendar: 6514
- Balinese saka calendar: 1685–1686
- Bengali calendar: 1170–1171
- Berber calendar: 2714
- British Regnal year: 4 Geo. 3 – 5 Geo. 3
- Buddhist calendar: 2308
- Burmese calendar: 1126
- Byzantine calendar: 7272–7273
- Chinese calendar: 癸未年 (Water Goat); 4461 or 4254 — to — 甲申年 (Wood Monkey); 4462 or 4255
- Coptic calendar: 1480–1481
- Discordian calendar: 2930
- Ethiopian calendar: 1756–1757
- Hebrew calendar: 5524–5525
- Hindu calendars
- Vikram Samvat: 1820–1821
- Shaka Samvat: 1685–1686
- Kali Yuga: 4864–4865
- Holocene calendar: 11764
- Igbo calendar: 764–765
- Iranian calendar: 1142–1143
- Islamic calendar: 1177–1178
- Japanese calendar: Hōreki 14 / Meiwa 1 (明和元年)
- Javanese calendar: 1689–1690
- Julian calendar: Gregorian minus 11 days
- Korean calendar: 4097
- Minguo calendar: 148 before ROC 民前148年
- Nanakshahi calendar: 296
- Thai solar calendar: 2306–2307
- Tibetan calendar: ཆུ་མོ་ལུག་ལོ་ (female Water-Sheep); 1890 or 1509 or 737 — to — ཤིང་ཕོ་སྤྲེ་ལོ་ (male Wood-Monkey); 1891 or 1510 or 738

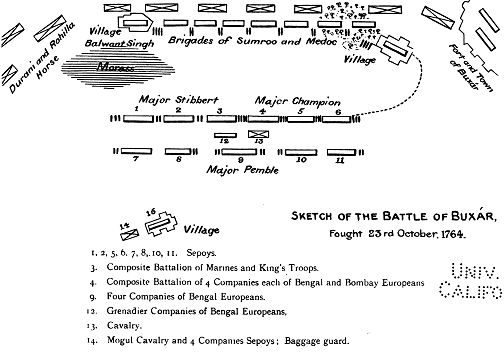
October 22: British East India Company defeats Mughal Empire and Allies in the Battle of Buxar.

1764 (MDCCLXIV) was a leap year starting on Sunday of the Gregorian calendar and a leap year starting on Thursday of the Julian calendar, the 1764th year of the Common Era (CE) and Anno Domini (AD) designations, the 764th year of the 2nd millennium, the 64th year of the 18th century, and the 5th year of the 1760s decade. As of the start of 1764, the Gregorian calendar was 11 days ahead of the Julian calendar, which remained in localized use until 1923.

== Events ==
=== January–June ===
- January 7 – The Siculicidium is carried out as hundreds of the Székely minority in Transylvania are massacred by the Austrian Army at Madéfalva.
- January 19 – John Wilkes is expelled from the House of Commons of Great Britain, for seditious libel.
- February 15 – The settlement of St. Louis is established.
- March 15 – The day after his return to Paris from a nine-year mission, French explorer and scholar Anquetil Du Perron presents a complete copy of the Zoroastrian sacred text, the Zend Avesta, to the Bibliothèque Royale in Paris, along with several other traditional texts. In 1771, he publishes the first European translation of the Zend Avesta.
- March 17 – Francisco Javier de la Torre arrives in Manila to become the new Spanish Governor-General of the Philippines.
- March 20 – After the British victory in the French and Indian War, the first post-war British expedition to explore the newly acquired territories east of the Mississippi River comes under attack by Tunica warriors. The 340 British Army men, under the command of Major Arthur Loftus, were at a spot south of Natchez, Mississippi and were forced to flee in their boats back toward the port of New Orleans while under fire from an unknown number of Tunicas firing from both banks.
- March 23 – Following lobbying by George Johnstone, the Governor of British West Florida, Britain's Lords of Trade vote to recommend the northern boundary for the new province to run from the confluence of the Yazoo River and the Mississippi (at modern-day Vicksburg, Mississippi) to the Chattahoochee River (at modern-day Phenix City, Alabama), and the Privy Council soon approves, bringing about 38,000 square miles (98,000 km^{2}) under the West Florida's jurisdiction.
- March 27 – The prince-electors, a group of nine German princes who select the next leader of the Holy Roman Empire, vote for the last time as the health of the Emperor Francis I declines. The electors (including Britain's King George III, who also rules as Elector of Hanover) approve Francis's son, Prince Joseph of Austria as King of the Romans. Upon the death of Francis in 1765, Prince Joseph becomes the Holy Roman Emperor Joseph II.
- March 31 – A mutual defense treaty between the Russian Empire and the Kingdom of Prussia is signed in Saint Petersburg between representatives of Russia's Empress Catherine the Great and Prussia's King Frederick the Great. By agreement, each nation agrees (for an eight-year period) to commit 10,000 soldiers and 2,000 horses to the defense of the other in case of an attack, and secretly agree to maintain security within the Polish–Lithuanian Commonwealth.
- April 1 – A solar eclipse occurs. On the same day, the undefeated Thoroughbred racehorse Eclipse, named after the event, is foaled at Keats Gore, near East Ilsley in Berkshire.
- April 5 – The Sugar Act is passed in Great Britain.
- April 21 – Residents of French Louisiana are informed for the first time that they will come under Spanish rule as the result of a secret agreement of November 13, 1762 whereby France has ceded all of its North American territory west of the Mississippi River. The Spanish, however, do not take possession until August 17, 1769.
- April 27 – Eight-year-old child prodigy Wolfgang Amadeus Mozart performs a private concert before King George III and Queen Charlotte in Great Britain, and has an encore on May 19.
- May 3 – Baden, one of the member states of the Confederation of Switzerland, declares a policy of remaining neutral in future conflicts, a model that is soon followed by other members of the Confederation and which eventually becomes the basis for Swiss neutrality from 1815 onward.
- June 21 – The English-language Quebec Gazette is established in Quebec City, Canada (the oldest surviving newspaper in North America).
- June 29 – One of the strongest tornadoes ever recorded hits Woldegk, Germany.

=== July–September ===
- July 6 – The last British troops depart Havana, Cuba, two years after having captured it from Spain during the Seven Years' War. The removal of troops follows the treaty between the two Kingdoms, with Spain ceding West Florida to Great Britain in return for the Havana withdrawal.
- July 8 – The Niagara Conference begins at the invitation of Sir William Johnson, the British Superintendent of Indian Affairs for the northern district, who hosts "one of the largest conventions of red men ever held on the continent" to negotiate the end of the hostilities from the French and Indian War. Reportedly, 2,000 representatives of the North American tribes meet at upstate New York coming from distances ranging "From Dakota to Hudson's Bay, and from Maine to Kentucky."
- July 11 – Conditional repatriation of the Acadians in Canada, French colonists who took up arms against the British during the war, is approved by order of King George III on advice of the Privy Council. The Council offers settlement to any Acadians willing to take an oath of allegiance to the British Crown and that those living in New Brunswick are to "be allowed to settle in Nova Scotia, but that they should be dispersed in small numbers in various localities."
- July 20 – King George, on advice of the Privy Council, issues the Royal Determination of the disputed boundary between the colonial provinces of New York and New Hampshire. The King-in-Council "doth hereby order and declare the western banks of the river Connecticut from where it enters the province of Massachusetts Bay, as far north as the 45th degree of north latitude to be the boundary line between the two provinces of New Hampshire and New York."
- July 26 – In what is described 250 years later as "The first documented United States school shooting", a group of four Delaware Indians invade a schoolhouse near what is now Greencastle, Pennsylvania and kill ten schoolchildren and their teacher, Enoch Brown. The massacre happens in the course of Pontiac's War, as retaliation against white settlement of Indian lands in central Pennsylvania. One student, Archie McCullough, manages to escape the carnage; a memorial is erected 120 years later on August 4, 1884.
- July 31 – Johnson arrives at the Niagara River site to meet with the representatives of the Indian nations.
- August 1 – The Treaty of Fort Niagara is signed between Great Britain and 44 North American Indian nations, bring an end to the ongoing war that had started in 1756 with most of the northern Indian tribes. Sir William Johnson appears on behalf of Britain, and principal chiefs appear for the Iroquois Confederacy, Wabash Confederacy, Illini Confederacy, Haudenosaunee, Seneca, Wyandot, Menominee, Algonquin, Nipissing, Ojibwa, Mississaugas, Mohawk, Abenaki, Huron, and Onondaga.
- September 7 – Stanisław August Poniatowski is elected as the King of the Polish–Lithuanian Commonwealth.

=== October–December ===
- October 15 – English scholar Edward Gibbon conceives the idea of writing The History of the Decline and Fall of the Roman Empire, "as I sat musing amid the ruins of the Capitol".
- October 22 – Battle of Buxar: The British East India Company defeats the combined armies of Mir Qasim, the Nawab of Bengal, the Nawab of Awadh, and Mughal Emperor Shah Alam II.
- November 9 – Mary Campbell, a captive of the Lenape during the French and Indian War, is turned over to forces commanded by Colonel Henry Bouquet.
- December 1 – Siege of Darbar Sahib (1764): 30 Sikhs defend the holy site of Golden Temple against 30,000 Afghans.

=== Date unknown ===
- The Royal Colony of North Carolina establishes a new county from the eastern portion of Granville County and names it Bute County for John Stuart, 3rd Earl of Bute, who had recently resigned his post as Prime Minister of Great Britain. In 1779 the State of North Carolina abolishes the county, when it forms Warren County from the northern portion and Franklin County from the southern portion.
- The French government withdraws wartime taxes.
- Catherine the Great establishes the first secondary education school for females in Russia – The Smolny Institute, for girls of the nobility in St. Petersburg.
- Chief Pontiac, participating in an armed conflict with other native tribes against British military, participates in a dialogue and exchange with the military of Britain, resulting eventually in a negotiated peace treaty.
- French Carthusian monks at Grande Chartreuse perfect a commercial recipe for Chartreuse (liqueur).

=== Publications ===
- Cesare Beccaria - On Crimes and Punishments (Dei delitti e delle pene), a founding work of penology
- Immanuel Kant - Observations on the Feeling of the Beautiful and Sublime (Beobachtungen über das Gefühl des Schönen und Erhabenen)
- Voltaire - Dictionnaire philosophique
- Horace Walpole - The Castle of Otranto "a story, translated by William Marshal, Gent., from the original Italian of Onuphrio Muralto", the first Gothic novel

== Births ==
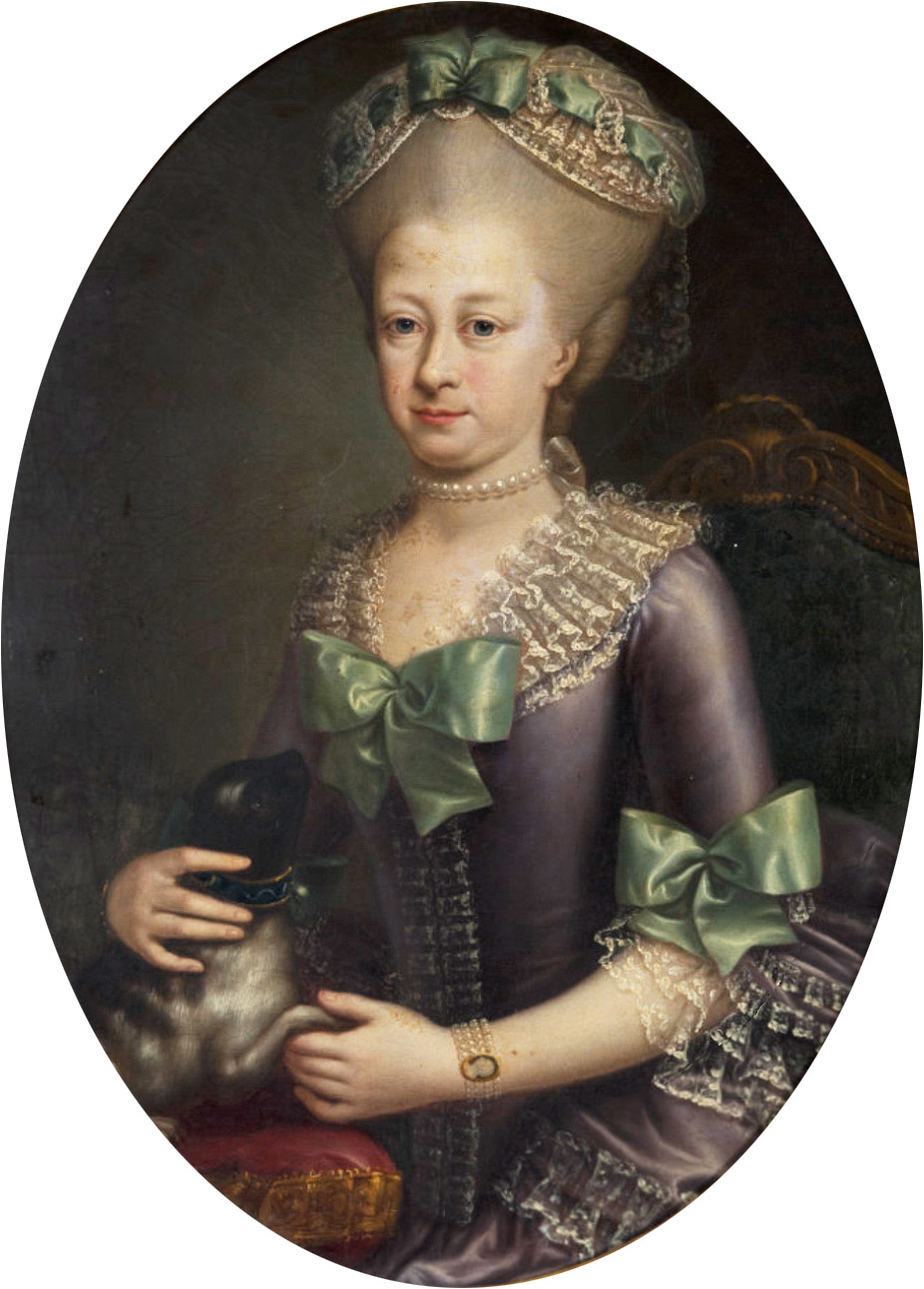
Princess Maria Carolina of Savoy

- January 6 – John Gray, last verified American Revolutionary War veteran (d. 1868)
- January 17 – Princess Maria Carolina of Savoy, crown princess of Saxony, died of smallpox (d. 1782)
- February 11 – Joseph Chénier, French poet (d. 1811)
- March 13 – Charles Grey, 2nd Earl Grey, 26th Prime Minister of the United Kingdom (d. 1845)
- April 3 – John Abernethy, English surgeon (d. 1831)
- April 13 – Laurent de Gouvion Saint-Cyr, French marshal (d. 1830)
- April 20 – Rudolph Ackermann, German-born English entrepreneur (d. 1834)

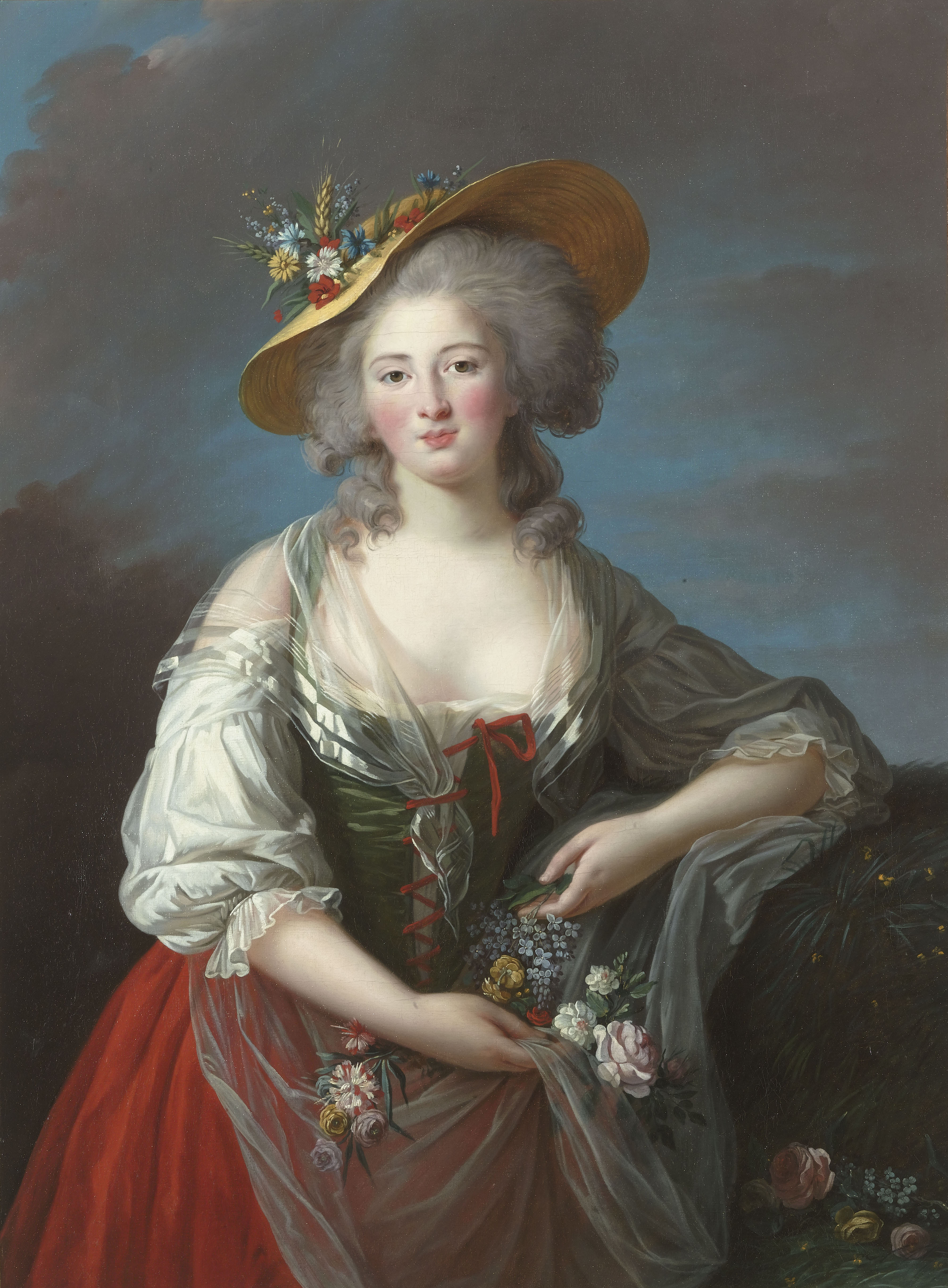
Princess Élisabeth of France

- May 3 – Princess Élisabeth of France, sister of Louis XVI (executed 1794)
- May 5 – Robert Craufurd, Scottish general (k. 1812)
- May 7 – Therese Huber, German writer and scholar (d. 1829)
- May 26 – Edward Livingston, American jurist, statesman (d. 1836)
- June 5 – James Smithson, British mineralogist, chemist and posthumous founder of the Smithsonian Institution (d. 1829)
- June 19 – José Gervasio Artigas, Uruguayan hero of independence (d. 1850)
- June 21 – Sidney Smith, British admiral (d. 1840)
- July 9 – Ann Radcliffe, English Gothic novelist (d. 1823)
- August 13 – Louis Baraguey d'Hilliers, French general (d. 1813)
- August 18 – Judah Leib Ben-Ze'ev, Galician Jewish modern Hebrew philologist, lexicographer, Biblical scholar and poet (d. 1811)
- September 5 – Henriette Herz, German salonnière (d. 1847)
- September 7 – Pierre Lorillard II, American businessman, real estate tycoon (d. 1843)
- September 17 – John Goodricke, English astronomer (d. 1786)
- September 25 – Fletcher Christian, English sailor and mutineer (d. 1793)
- November 1 – Frederick Reynolds, English playwright (born (d. 1841)
- December 7
  - Pierre Prévost, French panorama painter (d. 1823)
  - Claude-Victor Perrin, Duc de Belluno, Marshal of France (d. 1841)
- Date unknown – Maria Medina Coeli, Italian physician (d. 1846)
- Approximate date – Alexander Mackenzie (explorer), Scottish explorer of northern Canada (d. 1820)
- Circa 1764- Bennelong, Aboriginal Australian leader and translator, (d. 1819)

== Deaths ==
Giuseppe Alessandro Furietti

- January 14 – Giuseppe Alessandro Furietti, Italian Catholic cardinal (b. 1685)
- March 6 – Philip Yorke, 1st Earl of Hardwicke, Lord Chancellor of England (b. 1690)
- March 16 – Frederick Augustus Rutowsky, German general (b. 1702)
- March 17 – George Parker, 2nd Earl of Macclesfield, English astronomer (b. c.1696)
- March 25 – Mikhail Mikhalovich Golitsyn, Russian naval officer (b. 1684)
- March 30 – Pietro Locatelli, Italian composer (b. 1695)
- April 9 – Marco Benefial, Italian painter (b. 1684)
- April 15 – Madame de Pompadour, mistress of King Louis XV (b. 1721)
- April 17 – Johann Mattheson, German composer (b. 1681)
- May 3 – Francesco Algarotti, Italian philosopher (b. 1712)
- June 29 – Ralph Allen, English businessman and politician (b. 1693)
- July 7 – William Pulteney, 1st Earl of Bath, English politician (b. 1683)

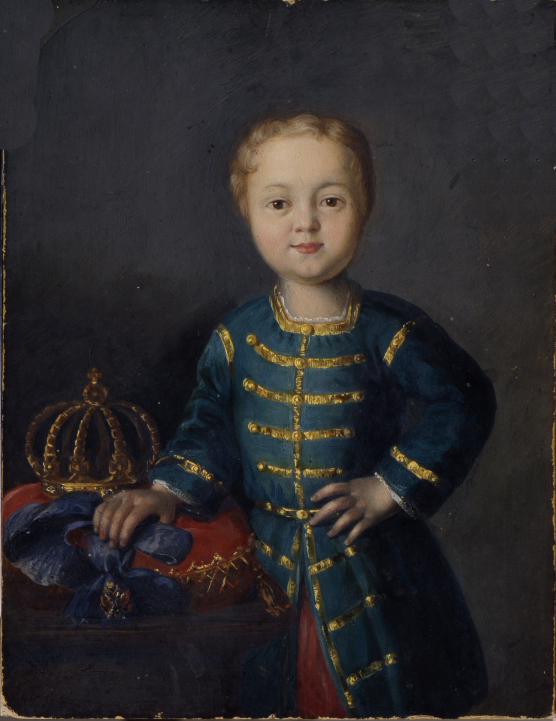
Tsar Ivan VI of Russia

- July 16 – Tsar Ivan VI of Russia (murdered in prison) (b. 1740)
- July 23 – Gilbert Tennent, Irish-born religious leader (b. 1703)
- September 2 – Nathaniel Bliss, English Astronomer Royal (b. 1700)
- September 12 – Jean-Philippe Rameau, French composer (b. 1683)
- September 23 – Robert Dodsley, English writer (b. 1703)
- September 26 – Benito Jerónimo Feijóo y Montenegro, Spanish scholar (b. 1676)

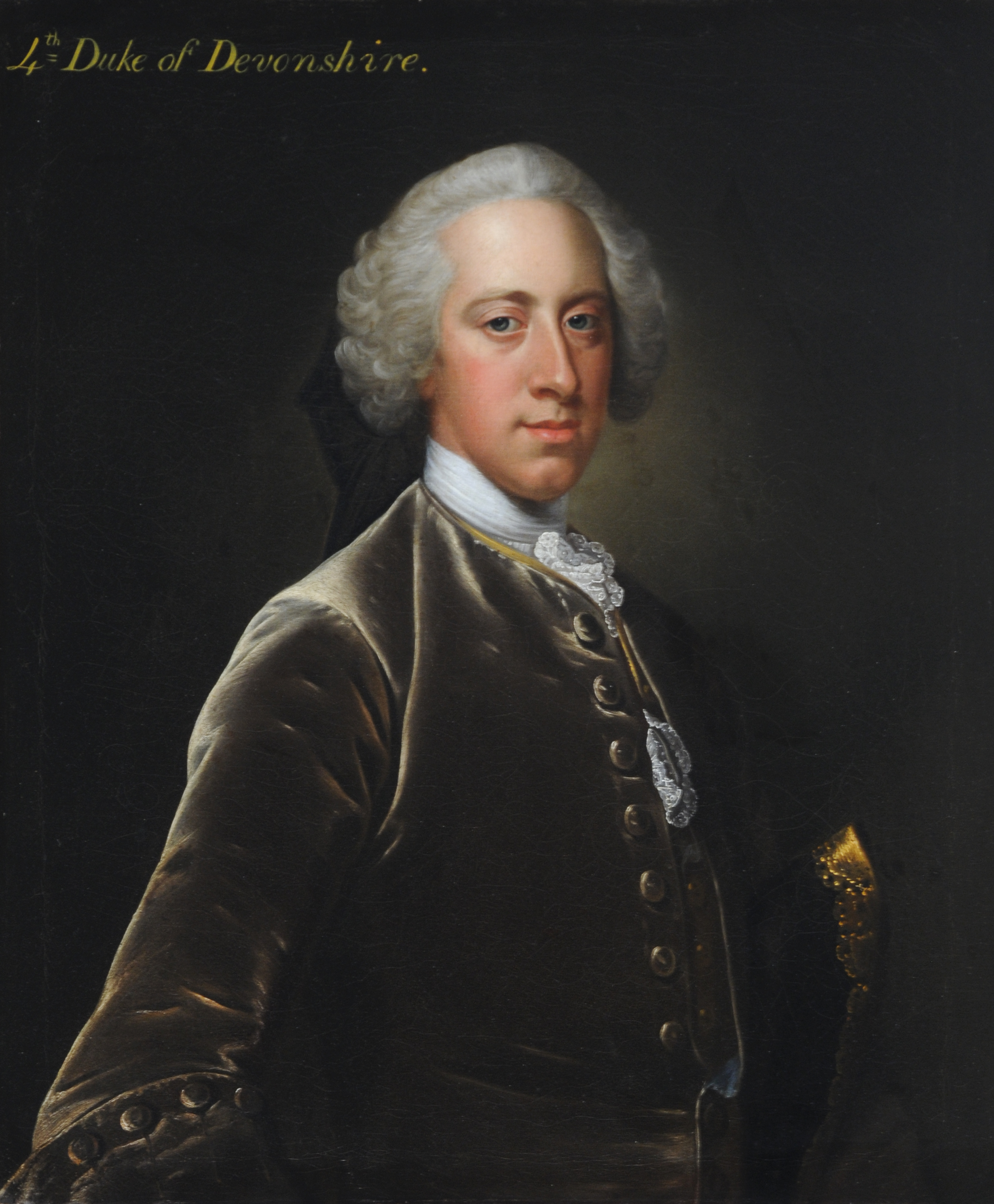
William Cavendish, 4th Duke of Devonshire

- October 2 – William Cavendish, 4th Duke of Devonshire, Prime Minister of Great Britain (b. 1720)
- October 22 – Jean-Marie Leclair, French composer and violinist (murdered) (b. 1697)
- October 23 – Emmanuel-Auguste de Cahideuc, Comte Dubois de la Motte, French naval officer (b. 1683)
- October 26 – William Hogarth, English painter and satirist (b. 1697)
- November 20 – Christian Goldbach, Prussian mathematician (b. 1690)
- November 27 – Aleksandr Aleksandrovich Menshikov, Russian army officer (b. 1714)
