= Furietti Centaurs =

Pair of Hellenistic or Roman statues

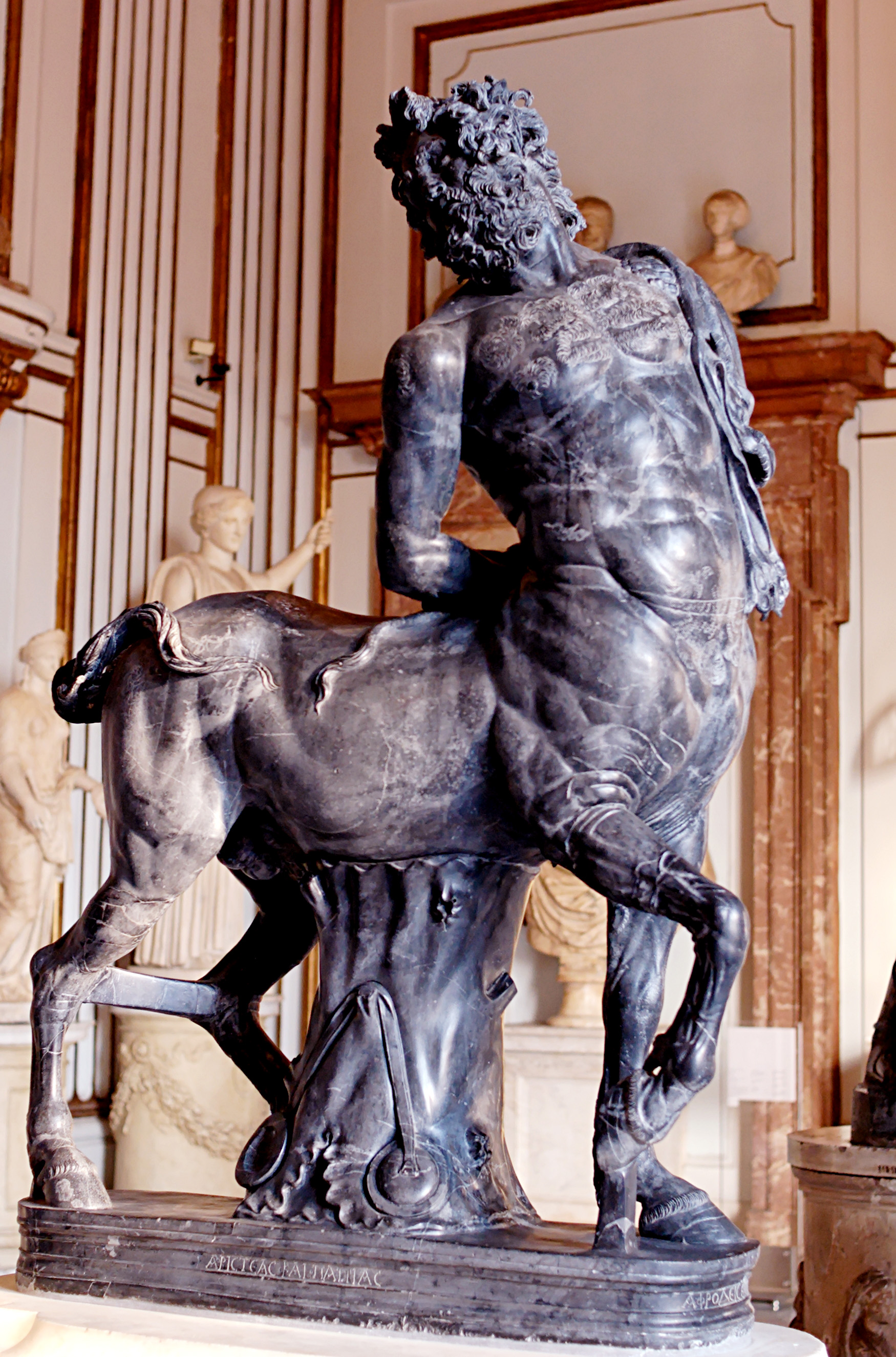
The Old Centaur
(Capitoline Museums)

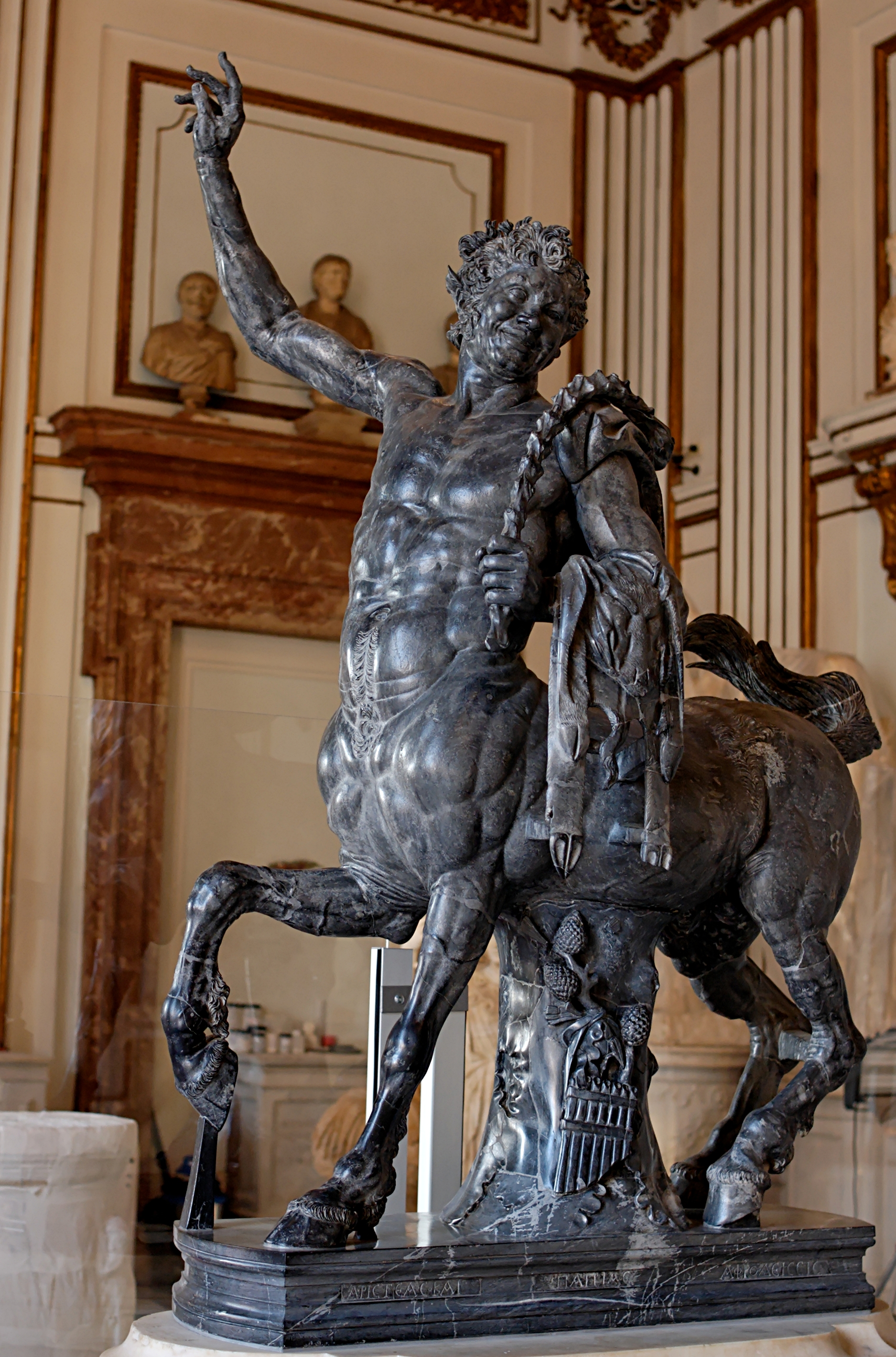
The Young Centaur

The Furietti Centaurs (known as the Old Centaur and Young Centaur, or Older Centaur and Younger Centaur, when being treated separately) are a pair of Hellenistic or Roman statues in grey-black marble from Laconia (Greece) sculptures of centaurs based on Hellenistic models. One is a mature, bearded centaur, with a pained expression, and the other is a young smiling centaur with his arm raised. The amorini are missing that once rode the backs of these centaurs, which are the outstanding examples of a group of sculptures varying the motif.

The strongly contrasted moods were intended to remind the Roman viewer of the soul troubled in pain with love or uplifted in joy, themes of Plato's Phaedrus and Hellenistic poetry.

== Capitoline Centaurs ==
The sculptures were found together at Hadrian's Villa in Tivoli by Monsignor Giuseppe Alessandro Furietti in December 1736; they were the outstanding pieces of his collection of antiquities, which he refused to give to Pope Benedict XIV— at the cost of a cardinal's hat. Furietti was eventually created cardinal priest, by Pope Clement XIII in the consistory of 24 September 1759. After the cardinal's death, his heirs sold the centaurs and the Furietti mosaic of four drinking doves for 14,000 scudi, and they have been in the Capitoline Museums ever since.

Both statues bear the signatures of Aristeas and Papias of Aphrodisias, a city in Asia Minor— we cannot be certain about the exact relationship of the signatures to the sculptures, whether as originators of the model or sculptors of these versions. Where the sculptures were produced is not sure either: whether in Aphrodisias, or whether the artists, of whom nothing else is known, had come from there to Rome. To judge by the stylistic date these Hadrianic copies will date to the late 1st or early 2nd century AD. They are generally assumed to be copies of 2nd century BC bronze Hellenistic originals, though recent critical study, notably by Brunilde Sismondo Ridgway, suggests that many sculptural types usually thought to be Hellenistic are in fact Roman pastiches or inventions.

== Louvre ==
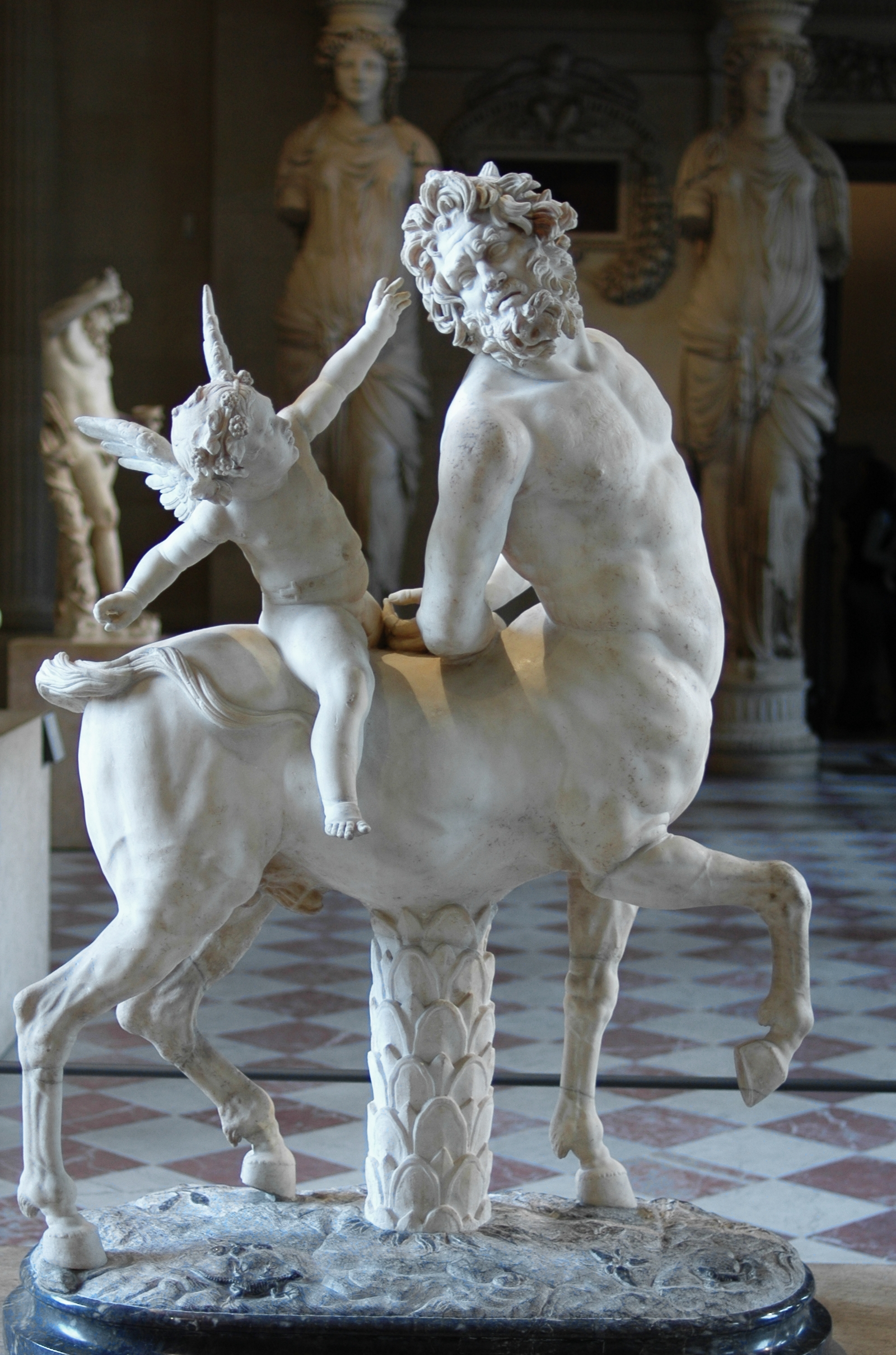
The Old Centaur (Louvre)

Another copy of the same type as the Old Centaur, this time in white marble, was excavated in Rome in the 17th century (having lost its probable Young Centaur pair). It entered the Borghese collection, but was acquired from Camillo Filippo Ludovico Borghese by Napoleon in 1807 and is now in the Louvre Museum. It has Eros on the centaur's back, teasing him, which has not survived on the Capitoline example, though Eros' arm and foot and the centaur's left arm on this example are restorations, and the base and the support beneath the centaur are modern additions. The original right arm of the centaur is pulled tautly back showing that he has his hands bound tightly behind his back, and "grimaces in pain and sorrow as an amorino pulls the centaur's head back at an abrupt angle."

== Reception ==
The pair were popular in the 18th century, as illustrations of centaurs that posed them as civilized patrons of hospitality and learning, like Chiron, rather than bestial half-animals (as at the Battle of the Centaurs). With their erotes, they were emblems of the joy of young love and the contrasting bondage of maturity to love, themes to which a Rococo audience would easily respond. The observant Ennio Quirino Visconti remarked on the Bacchic attributes of the Borghese/Louvre centaur, whose amorino is crowned with berried vine, to suggest that the forces in play were those of intoxication rather than love. Jon van de Grift, in examining the iconography of a pair of early Imperial Roman silver scyphi (drinking cups) embossed with motifs of centaurs ridden by erotes, part of the Berthouville treasure, notes that "the motif of an amorino torturing an old sullen centaur, usually within a lively Dionysiac procession, is encountered in Roman mosaics and Dionysiac sarcophagi;" he offers the Furietti centaurs as iconographic parallels.

Casts of them were collected across Europe - for example, the pair at the Royal Academy, London, one at either side of the foot of the main staircase, which are there to this day (in what is now the Courtauld Institute gallery; or those bought by Joseph Nollekens from Bartolomeo Cavaceppi that may still be seen at Shugborough Hall, Staffordshire. Full-sized marble copies were also produced in large numbers - Cavaceppi produced them, and Pietro Della Valle sculpted one in Rome for the count Grimod d'Orsay - he intended it to be placed on a fountain in the Museum Courtyard in 1795, but it was in fact placed at Saint-Cloud in July 1802 (it was later brought to Versailles on 23 March 1872, and on 24 September 1924 moved into the Grand Trianon garden there.
