= Filippo De Pisis =

Italian painter

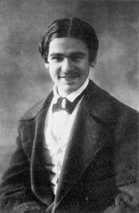
- De Pisis aged 18
- Born: Luigi Filippo Tibertelli; 11 May 1896; Ferrara, Kingdom of Italy
- Died: 2 April 1956 (aged 59); Milan, Italy
- Resting place: Cimitero monumentale della Certosa di Ferrara, Ferrara
- Known for: Painting; drawing; writer

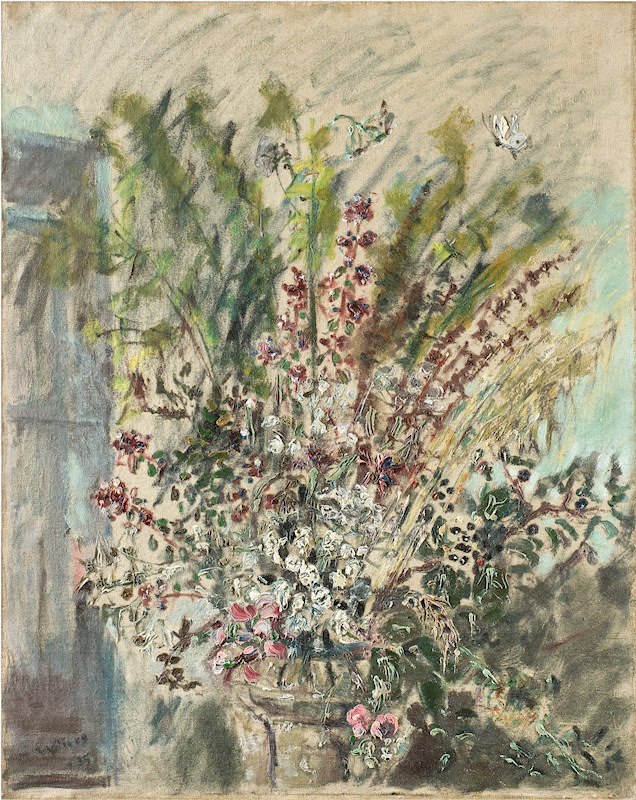
Fiori di campo, 1953, oil on canvas (Fondazione Cariplo)

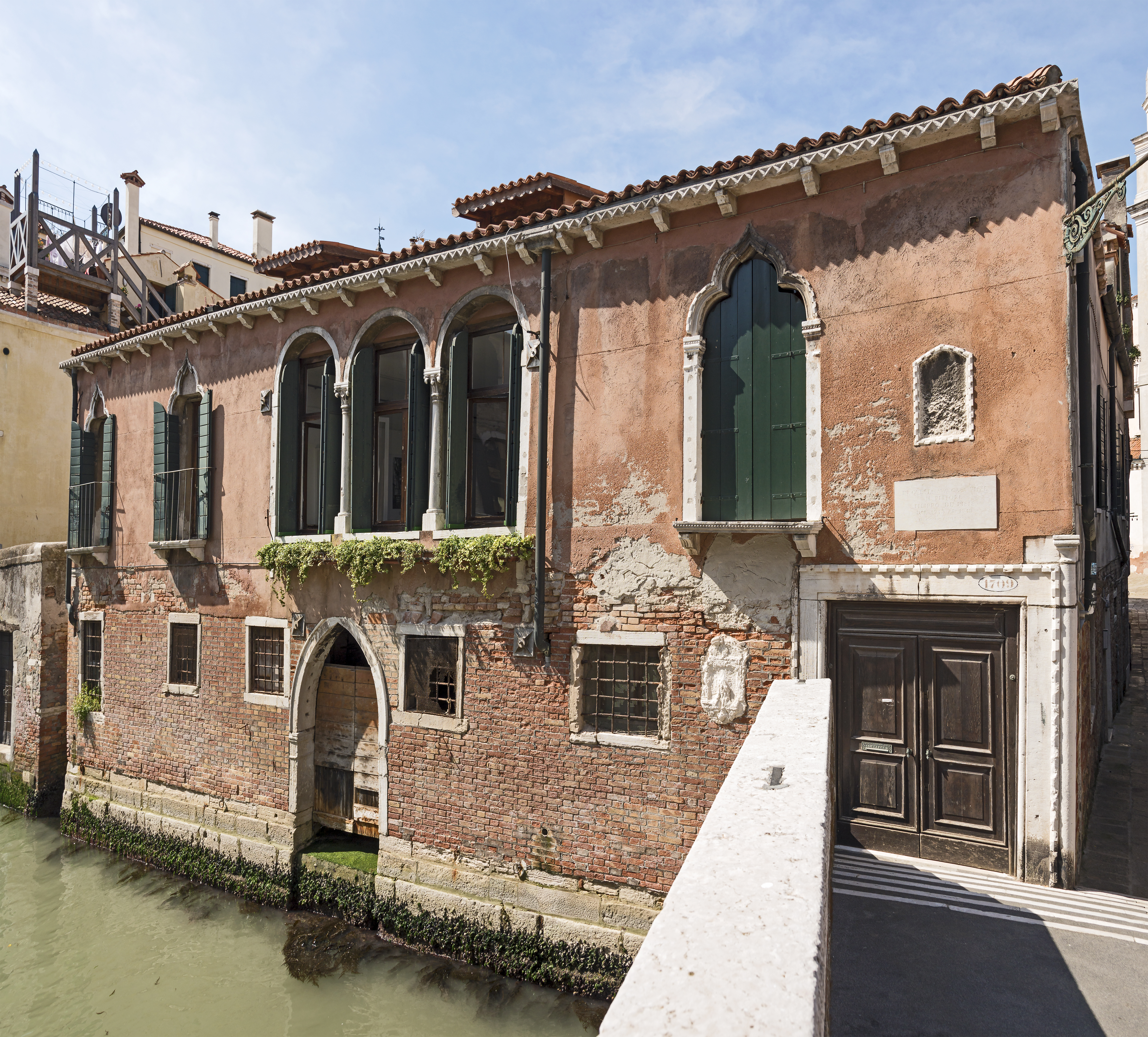
House of De Pisis in Venice (1943–1949)

Filippo De Pisis (11 May 1896 – 2 April 1956) was an Italian painter and poet.

== Biography ==
De Pisis was born Luigi Filippo Tibertelli in Ferrara, Italy. He studied literature and philosophy at the University of Bologna beginning in 1914. In 1919 he moved to Rome, where he started to paint. He published a collection of his writings, La città dalle 100 meraviglie, in 1920. While important editors of his time criticized De Pisis for producing overly-sentimental poetry, this emotional streak translated well on canvas. De Pisis is best known for his cityscapes, metaphysically-inspired maritime scenes, and still lifes, especially those depicting flowers. His work has a particularly airy, in-the-moment quality, and is laden with a sort of pathetic pleasure-pain. There are unexpected juxtapositions of scale and space, as when still-life objects are arranged on a surface that seems to join together with the seascape beyond. De Pisis also executed a large body of lesser-known work, comprising homoerotic sketches of the male nude.

De Pisis spent his life in Rome, Paris and Venice. He lived a very extravagant lifestyle; he had a pet parrot named Coco, and in Venice he was one of a handful of residents at the time who used a gondola. He had two personal gondoliers on 24-hour duty, who wore black-and-gold livery.

De Pisis's work was shown twice in the Venice Biennale: once during his life, and once posthumously.

In his later years he suffered from a neurological disorder. In 1948 he entered a clinic in Bologna, and from 1949 until his death his main residence was Villa Fiorita in Brugherio, a nursing home for patients with nervous diseases. He died in Milan in 1956.

== Legacy ==
De Pisis's work for the Verzocchi collection in 1949–1950 is now housed in the Pinacoteca Civica of Forlì. A large portion of his work is also housed in the Museo Filippo de Pisis in Ferrara.

One of the three comprehensive schools in Brugherio is named for Filippo de Pisis.

== Bibliography ==
- Zanotto, S.; Filippo De Pisis ogni giorno, Venice, Italy (1991) (in Italian)
- Naldini, N.; De Pisis - Vita Solitaria di un Poeta Pittore, Turin, Italy (1991) (in Italian)
