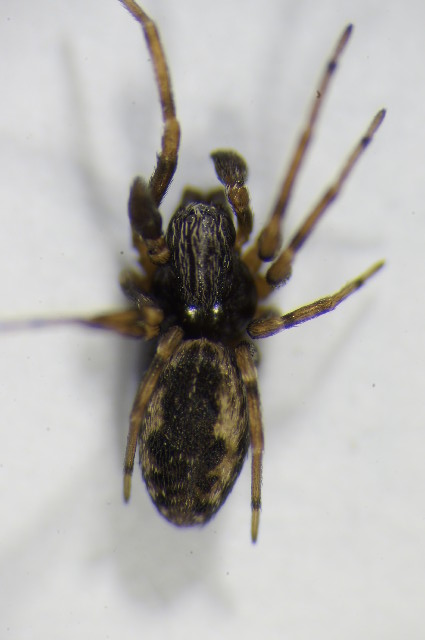

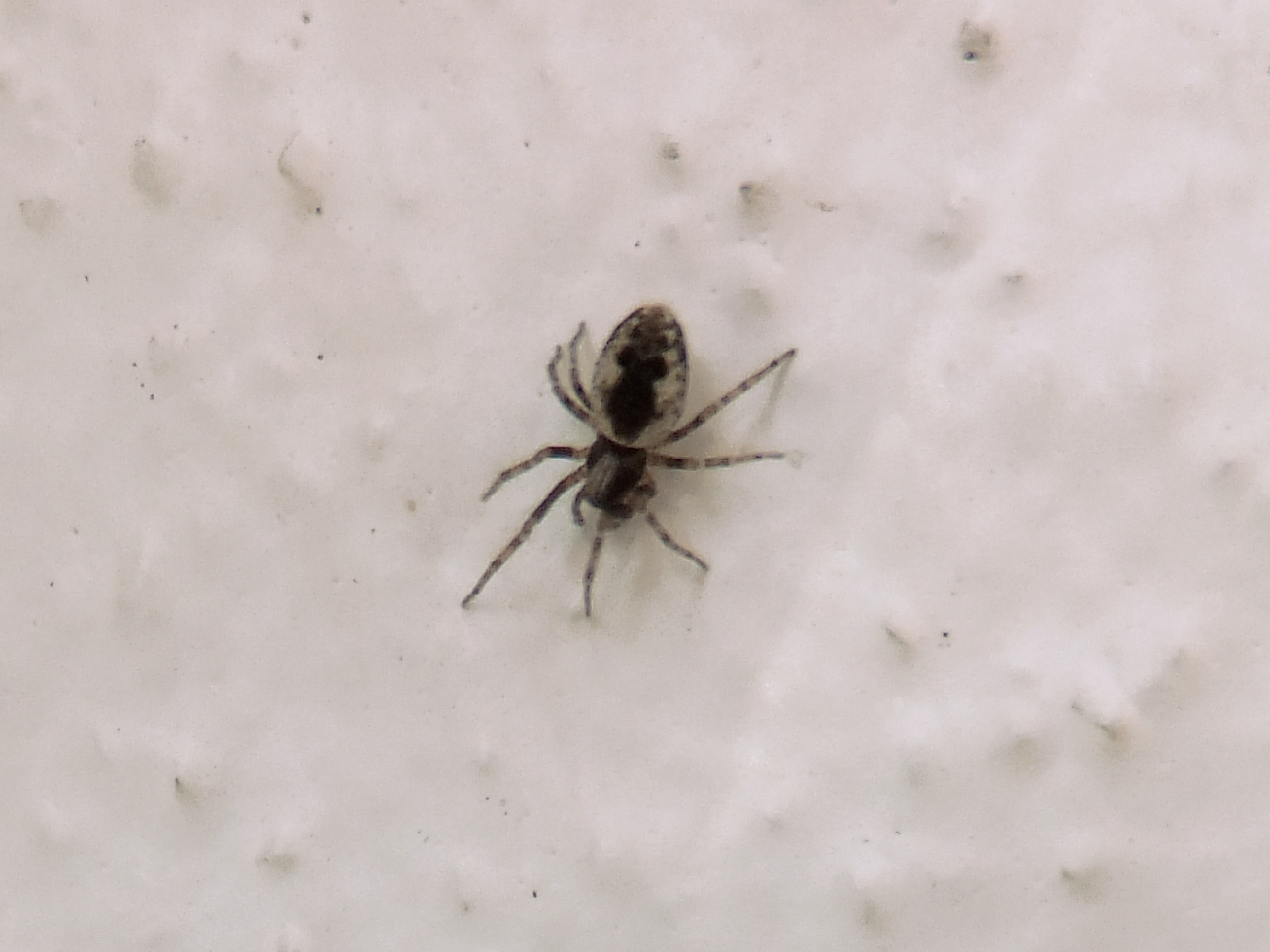
- B. civica

Scientific classification
- Kingdom: Animalia
- Phylum: Arthropoda
- Subphylum: Chelicerata
- Class: Arachnida
- Order: Araneae
- Infraorder: Araneomorphae
- Family: Dictynidae
- Genus: Brigittea; Lehtinen, 1967

Type species
- B. latens (Fabricius, 1775)

Species
- 6, see text

= Brigittea =

Genus of spiders

Brigittea is a genus of araneomorph spiders in the family Dictynidae, first described by Pekka T. Lehtinen in 1967.

== Description ==
The carapace is dark brown with rows of white setae covering it dorsally, while the opisthosoma is oval bearing dense white setae with a dark central area forming a pattern stretching from the anterior border to the spinnerets. Males are slightly smaller than females and have bow-shaped chelicerae.

== Species ==
As of September 2025 it contains six species:

- Brigittea avicenna Zamani & Marusik, 2021 — Iran
- Brigittea civica (Lucas, 1850) — Europe, North Africa, Turkey, Iran. Introduced to North America
- Brigittea colona (Simon, 1906) — New Caledonia
- Brigittea innocens (O. Pickard-Cambridge, 1872) — Italy, Eastern Mediterranean, Kazakhstan
- Brigittea latens (Fabricius, 1775) — Europe to Central Asia
- Brigittea vicina (Simon, 1873) — Mediterranean to Central Asia
