= Brigittea innocens =

Scientific classification
- Kingdom: Animalia
- Phylum: Arthropoda
- Subphylum: Chelicerata
- Class: Arachnida
- Order: Araneae
- Infraorder: Araneomorphae
- Family: Dictynidae
- Genus: Brigittea
- Species: B. innocens

Binomial name
- Brigittea innocens (O. Pickard-Cambridge, 1872)

Synonyms
- Dictyna aharonii Strand, 1914; Dictyna innocens O. Pickard-Cambridge, 1872; Dictyna jacksoni Bristowe, 1935

Species of spider

Brigittea innocens (synonym Dictyna innocens) is a spider species found in the Eastern Mediterranean (Greece, Cyprus, Turkey, Syria, Israel and Egypt), Georgia and Kazakhstan.
