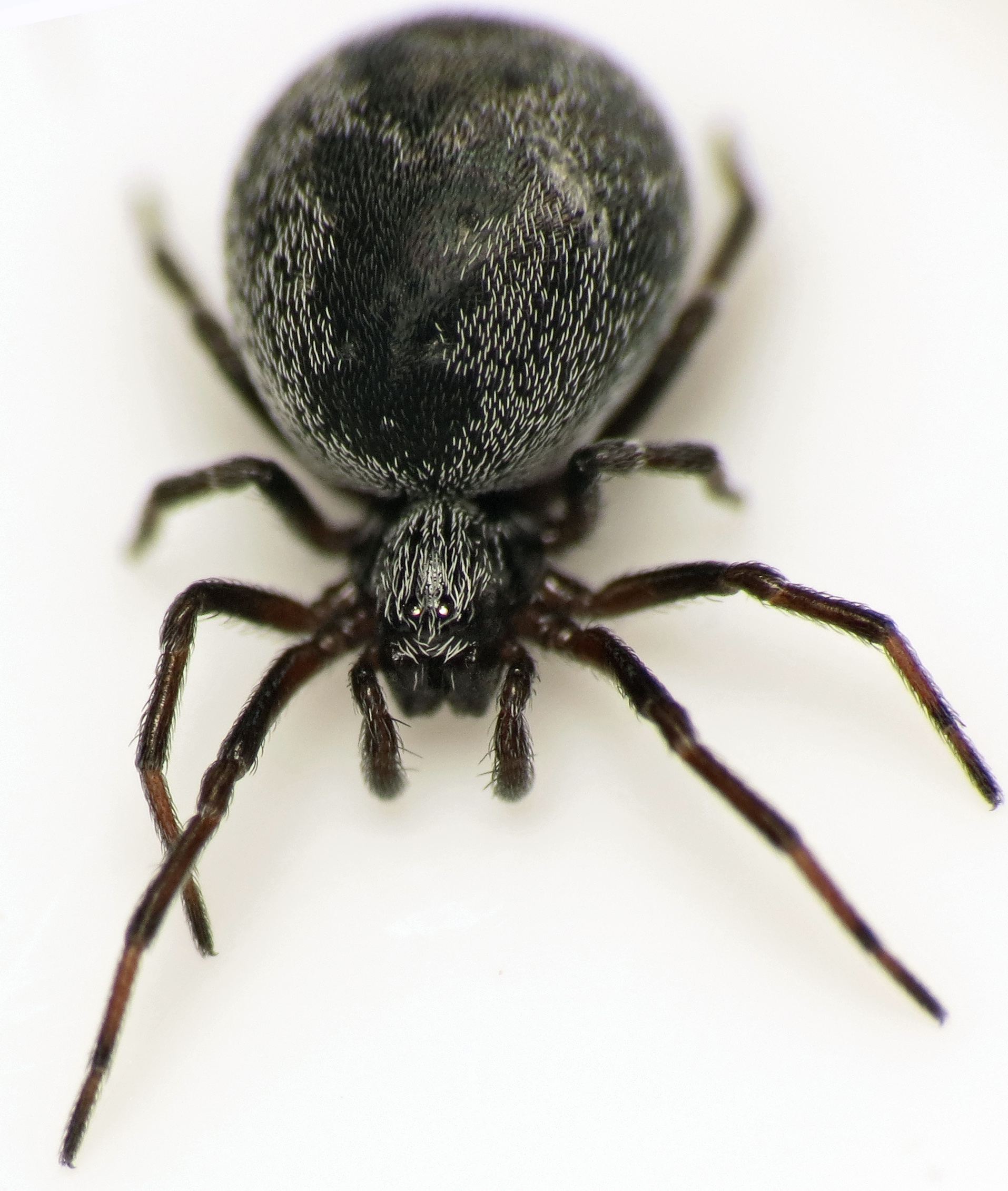
- Female

Scientific classification
- Kingdom: Animalia
- Phylum: Arthropoda
- Subphylum: Chelicerata
- Class: Arachnida
- Order: Araneae
- Infraorder: Araneomorphae
- Family: Dictynidae
- Genus: Brigittea
- Species: B. latens

Binomial name
- Brigittea latens (Fabricius, 1775)

Synonyms
- Dictyna latens

= Brigittea latens =

Species of spider

Brigittea latens is a species of spider found in Europe to Central Asia. It belongs to the family of Dictynidae.
