= Villa Fiorita, Brugherio =

Coordinates: 45°33′4.45″N 9°18′1.05″E

Villa Fiorita (Palazzo municipale di Brugherio)
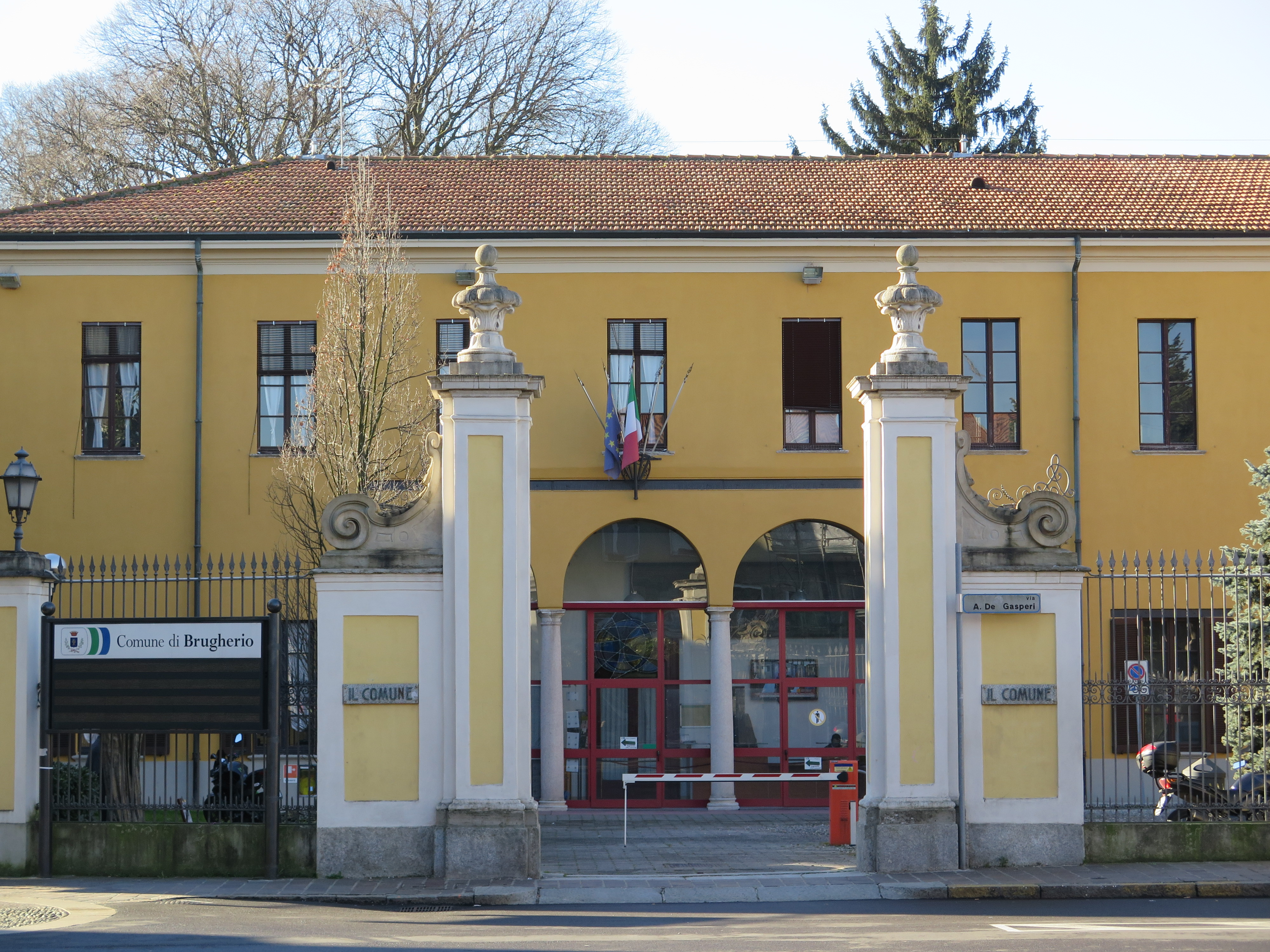
- Villa Fiorita's entrance
- Interactive map of the Villa Fiorita (Palazzo municipale di Brugherio) area

General information
- Type: City hall
- Location: piazza Cesare Battisti, 1, Brugherio, Monza and Brianza, Italy
- Owner: Municipality of Brugherio

Villa Scotti-Cornaglia-Noseda-Bertani, commonly known as Villa Fiorita, is a building in Lombardy, Italy, where the Brugherio Comune's headquarters are housed.

== History ==
Villa Fiorita is a historic aristocratic urban mansion with an L-shape layout. An extension overlooks the old town through a wrought iron railing, supported by late baroque pillars, forming the main entrance. The rear entrance faces a large park leading to the church square.

The mansion, built in 1721, was an "aristocratic house" with shells and a garden. It belonged to the counts of Scotti, who have been in Brugherio since the beginning of sixteenth century. The land was owned by the Court of Monza.

In 1778 the count of Vedano, Giambattista Gallarati Scotti, sold it (with the neighbouring building, today known as Palazzo Ghirlanda-Silva) to Gaspare Ghirlanda who probably started the reconstruction and the decorative works of which many traces remain.

The mansion was then inherited by the Nosedas, a family of Milanese land-owners, who used it as a summer residence. In 1921 it was bought by Bertani's brother.

In 1938 the mansion was given to a nursing home for "nervous afflictions" known as Villa Fiorita. This clinic, managed by the accountant Bogani, who came from Milan, between 1949 and 1956 was home to the painter Filippo De Pisis from Ferrara who used the mansion's greenhouse as an office, now called Serra De Pisis.

The building, because of its heritage status and the recent transformation into a nursing home, has been frequently modified for practical and sanitary reasons: two shells and an extension were demolished in 1963.

The building was further remodelled, however without changing the structure, to house the town hall, whose opening took place on the 17 December 1978. During the renovation, the original three-arcades portico was rebuilt with granite pillars.

== Description ==
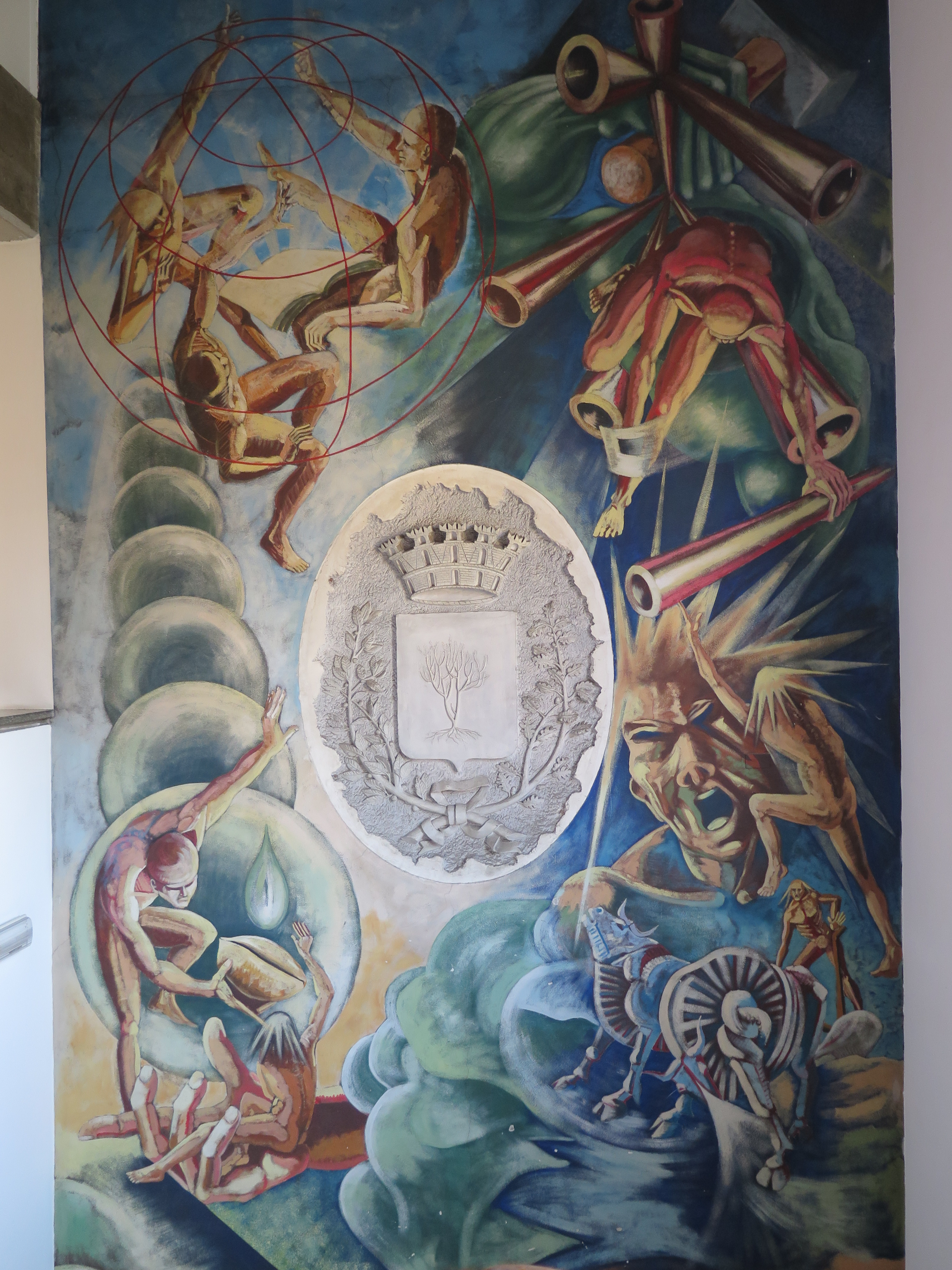
"Arti e mestieri" - fresco inside Villa Fiorita

The remodelling works removed almost all the fresco decorations on the facade. At the rear, there is a monochrome representation of cariatidis that seem to be supporting the balconies but these are in fact a twentieth-century addition.

Inside in the mayor's office on the ground floor, there is a fresco on the ceiling while in the hall and in the central room overlooking the garden, there are the remains of eighteenth-century frieze frescos depicting mythological scenes (possibly episodes from Cleopatra's life).

Through the grand staircase to the first floor, there is a large "Arts and crafts" fresco by Max Squillace, Franco Ghezzi and Gian Mario Mariani. The wall painting depicts cultural, family, farming and factory activities, and man's aggressiveness. The farming activities are represented by a man with a plough and oxen. The family, in a social context, is depicted by a man who gives to a woman, lying on the large hand of mother earth, a wheat seed as a sign of fertility. The figures contained inside a globe represent culture. Finally, a man symbolizes aggressiveness within man. In the centre, showing the relationship of the figures with the city, there is the town's coat of arms.

== Villa Fiorita's Park ==
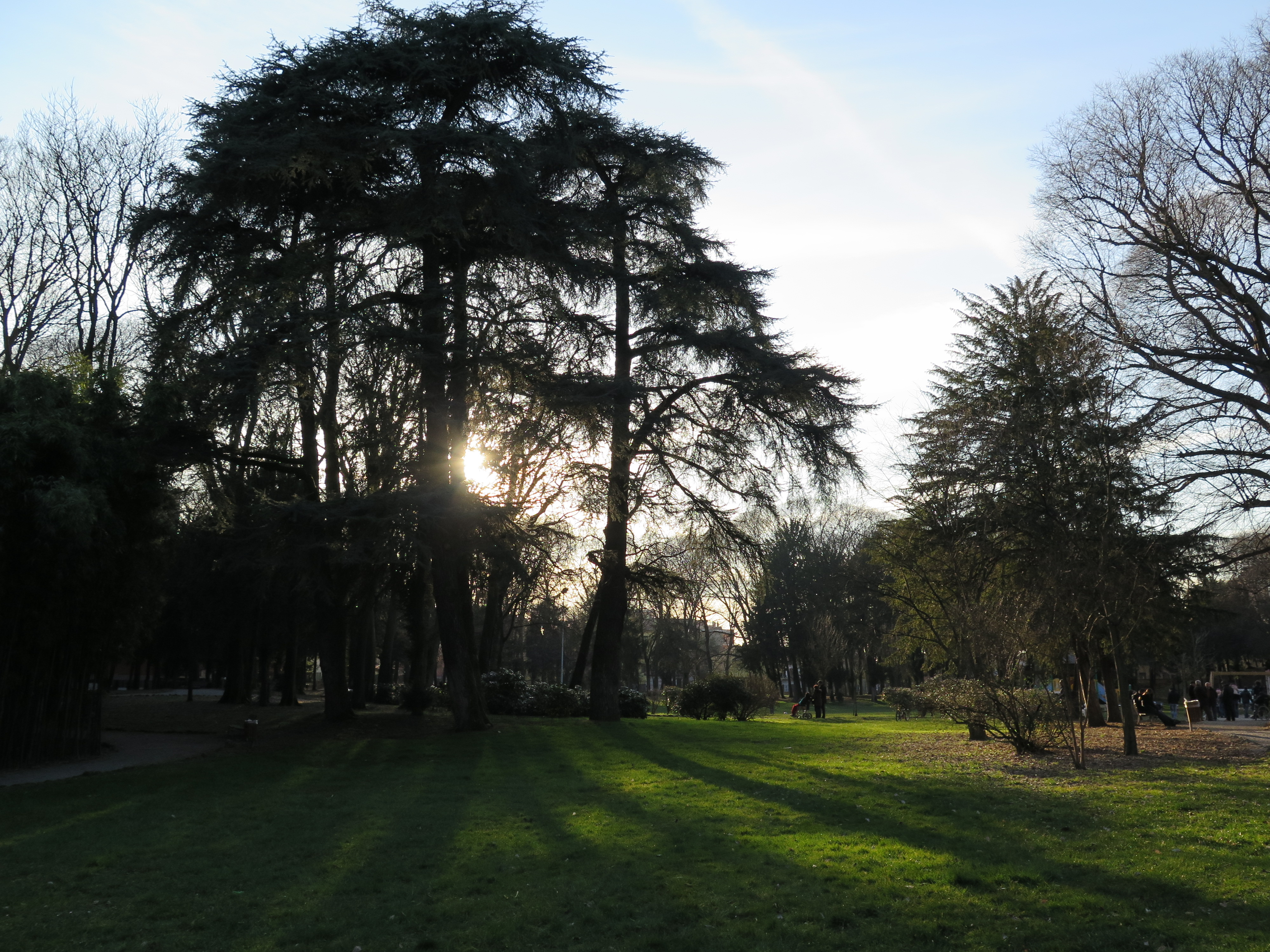
Villa Fiorita Park

Beyond Villa Fiorita, in the centre of Brugherio, there is an English landscape garden covering about 7,000 m^{2} (75,000 sq ft). It was first documented from the eighteenth century, when it was just a small garden annexed to count Ottaviano Scotti's mansion.

In the second half of the nineteenth century it was enlarged and transformed into a classical romantic garden with a man-made hill, winding paths, irregularly set shrubs, rocks bordering the flower-beds, allées and fencing.

There are more than 600 different shrubs composed not just by hackberries and yew trees, but also by cedars, horse chestnuts, beech trees, ginkgos, maples, elms and robinias.

Of particular note are the monumental hackberry in front of the De Pisis greenhouse, the magnificent Sophora japonica and the historic thicket of bamboo.

The park includes a playground for children and a kiosk with toilets. The park also hosts cultural and musical events and, in the summer evenings, films are shown in the open-air.

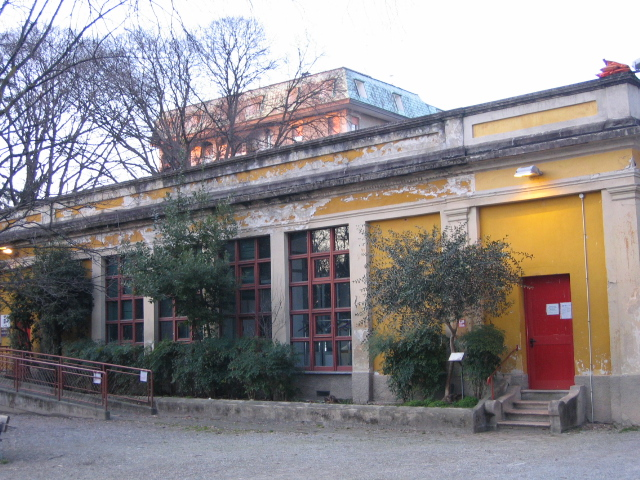
De Pisis Greenhouse.

== De Pisis greenhouse ==
The Villa Fiorita Park includes a building that was used as a greenhouse. Villa Fiorita became a psychiatric nursing home, and between 1949 and 1956 it hosted the painter Filippo de Pisis (1896-1956) of Ferrara who used the greenhouse as an office. He chose it for its park setting and its optimal exposure to sunlight.

== See also ==
- Palazzo Ghirlanda-Silva

== Bibliography ==
- Brugherio: i suoi luoghi, la sua storia: 225. anniversario del primo volo italiano in mongolfiera con uomini a bordo (in Italian). Brugherio: Comune di Brugherio. 2009.
- Tribuzio Zotti, Luciana (1986). Brugherio nei documenti (in Italian). Brugherio: Musicografia Lombarda.
- Tribuzio Zotti, Luciana (1987). Brugherio: luoghi memorabili (in Italian). Brugherio: Parole Nuove.
- Mancini, Manuela (1996). BRUGHERIO Presente e Passato (in Italian). Milano: Swan Edizioni.
- Cooperativa Agricola di Consumo. Calendario BRUGHERIO ierIOggi 1994 (in Italian). Milano.
