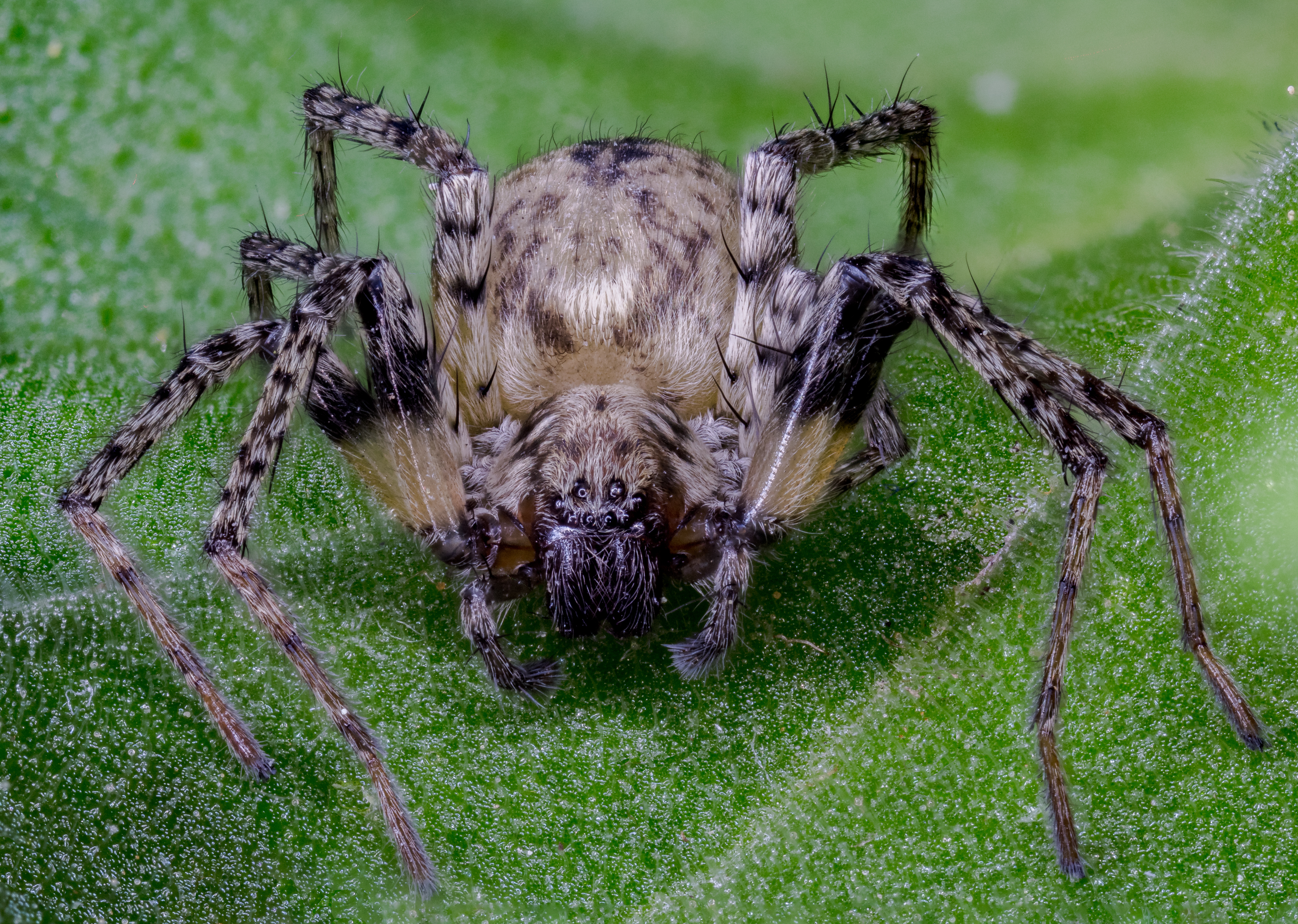
- B. civica from Germany

Conservation status
- Least Concern (SANBI Red List)

Scientific classification
- Kingdom: Animalia
- Phylum: Arthropoda
- Subphylum: Chelicerata
- Class: Arachnida
- Order: Araneae
- Infraorder: Araneomorphae
- Family: Dictynidae
- Genus: Brigittea
- Species: B. civica

Binomial name
- Brigittea civica (Lucas, 1848)

Synonyms
- Dictyna frutetorum Simon, 1885

= Brigittea civica =

Species of spider

Brigittea civica is a species of spider in the family Dictynidae.

== Distribution ==
Brigittea civica is a cosmopolitan species with a wide global distribution across Europe, North Africa, and Turkey, and has been introduced to South Africa. In South Africa, it is presently known only from Gauteng province, where it is found at an elevation of 1,252 m above sea level.

== Habitat and ecology ==
Brigittea civica constructs retreat-webs on walls, with the spider positioning itself in the middle of the web, which consists of sticky threads radiating outward. Population buildup occurs very rapidly. The species is thermophilic with high susceptibility to frost, and does not tolerate direct rain and wind. While this species is often found in colonies on building walls, its natural habitat is on rocks.

== Description ==
Brigittea civica is known from both sexes. The front body (prosoma) is dark brown, with a dark border, and the sternum is dark brown to black. The legs are light brown and may have dark bands. Both sexes have a body length of 2.3-3.5 mm.

== Conservation ==
Brigittea civica is listed as Least Concern by the South African National Biodiversity Institute due to its wide global geographic range. As an introduced species known to be invasive, regular sampling is necessary.
