= Biblioteca Civica Angelo Mai =

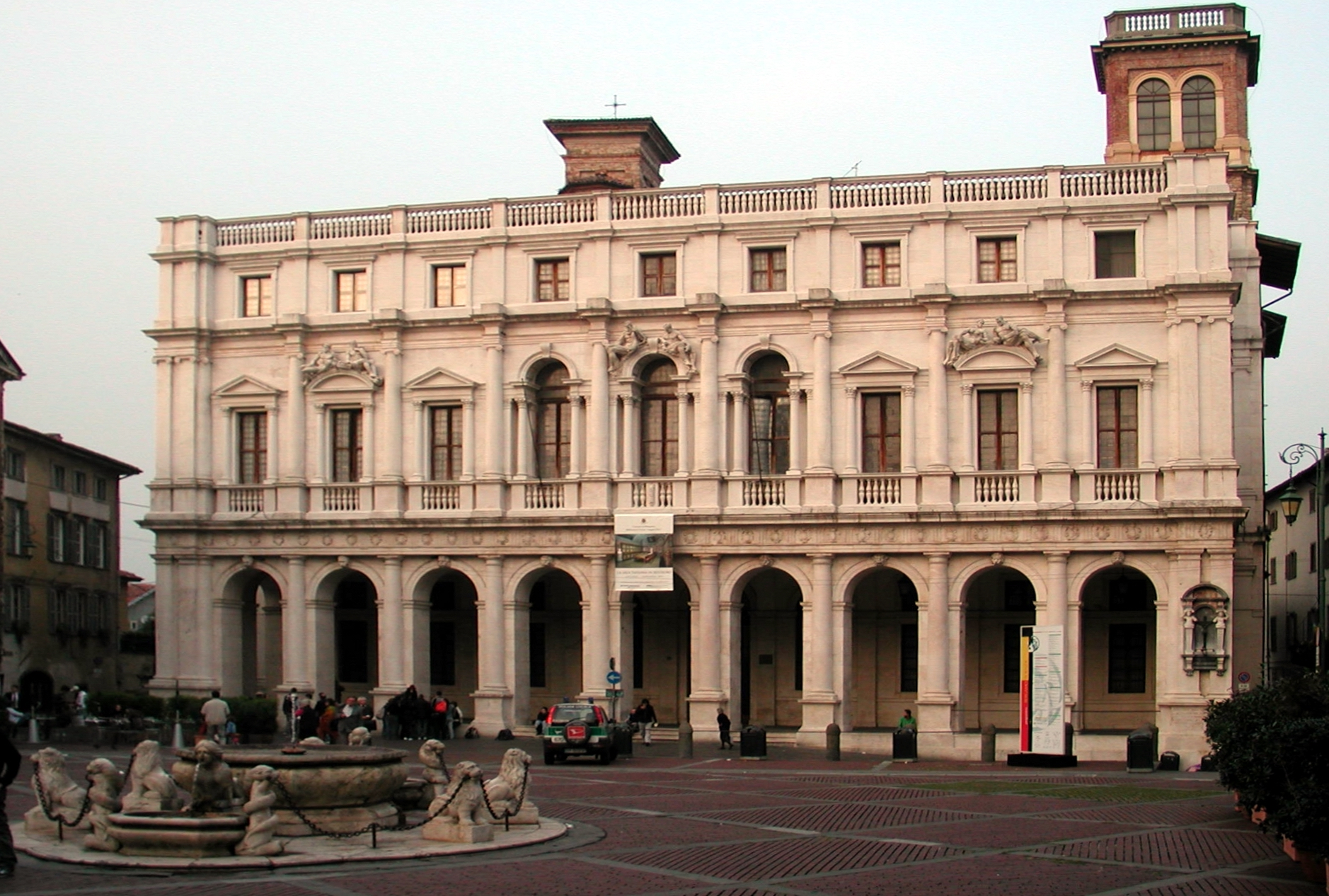
Biblioteca Civica Angelo Mai in Bergamo (photo 2005)

The Biblioteca Civica (est. 1760) of Bergamo, Italy, is a public library founded by Giuseppe Alessandro Furietti. Its headquarters occupy the Palazzo Nuovo di Bergamo on the Piazza Vecchia.

== Bibliography ==
in English

- Paul Oskar Kristeller (December 1977). "Bergamo". Iter Italicum: a finding list of uncatalogued or incompletely catalogued humanistic manuscripts of the Renaissance in Italian and other libraries. Vol. 1: Italy A-N. Brill. pp. 6+. ISBN 9004069259. 1977?
- Ennio Sandal (1990). "Endowed Municipal Public Libraries". Libraries & Culture. 25 (3: Libraries and Librarianship in Italy). US: 358–371. JSTOR 25542275.

in Italian

- Maria Luisa Gatti Perer [in Italian]; Marion Marubbi, eds. (1995). Tesori Miniati: codici e incunaboli dei fondi antichi di Bergamo e Brescia. Milan: Silvana Editoriale. ISBN 8836604897. (Exhibit catalog)
