= Giuseppe Alessandro Furietti =

Italian Roman Catholic cardinal, antiquarian and philologist

His Eminence Giuseppe Alessandro Furietti
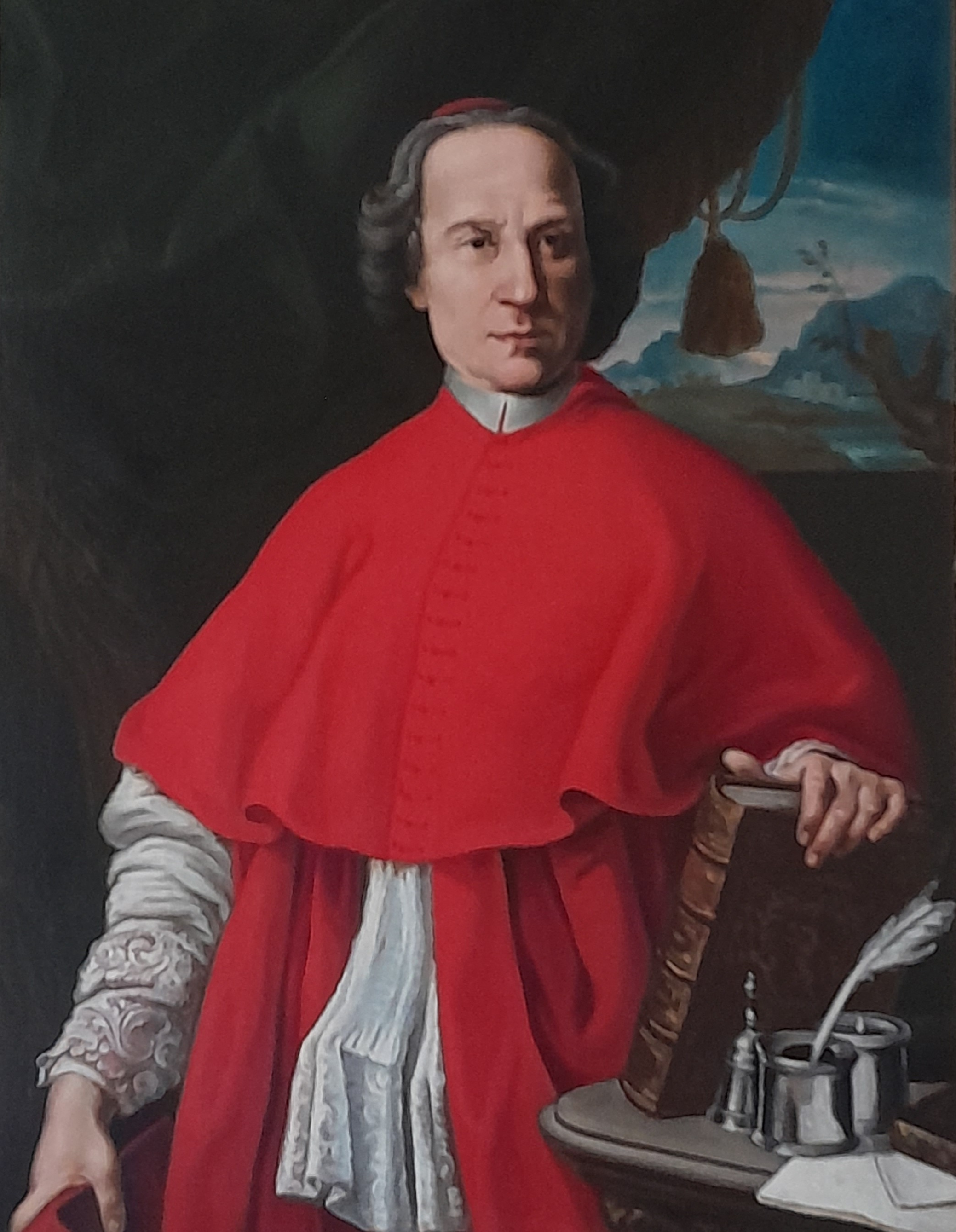
- Marco Benefial, Portrait of Furietti (Palazzo Moroni, Bergamo)
- Diocese: Diocese of Rome

Orders
- Created cardinal: 24 September 1759 by Pope Clement XIII
- Rank: Cardinal-Priest of Santi Quirico e Giulitta

Personal details
- Born: January 24, 1685 Bergamo, Republic of Venice
- Died: 14 January 1764 (aged 78) Rome, Papal States
- Buried: Santi Bartolomeo ed Alessandro dei Bergamaschi
- Denomination: Roman Catholic
- Parents: Giovanni Furietti; Caterina Terzi
- Education: University of Pavia

Giuseppe Alessandro Furietti (24 January 1685 – 14 January 1764) was a Roman Catholic cardinal, an antiquarian and philologist, and a collector of antiquities whose ambitious excavations at the site of Hadrian's Villa at Tivoli rewarded him with the Furietti Centaurs and other Roman sculpture.

== Biography ==
Furietti was born at Bergamo, the son of Giovanni Marco Sonzogni Furietti, noble, of a local branch of the Sonzogni. He was educated at the Almo Collegio Borromeo, Pavia, then at the University of Pavia, where he received his doctorate in canon and civil law (utroque iure). In spite of his distinguished service to the Apostolic Camera, and Furietti's dedication of a book on mosaics to him, the cardinal's hat was withheld by Pope Benedict XIV partly in pique for Furietti's refusal to part with the famous marble centaurs for the Museo Capitolino, which had opened in 1734. Furietti was eventually created cardinal priest, by Clement XIII in the consistory of 24 September 1759.

For a sum, Furietti obtained rights to excavate the section of Hadrian's Villa that belonged to Simplicio Bulgarini. As early as 1724, Conte Giuseppe Fede had been buying up parcels of land in the extensive villa, which had become divided up among a multitude of owners, forming the nucleus of one of the outstanding recently formed and non-papal collections of antiquities in Rome. After only a few days Furietti's crews found the famous statues of Centaurs signed by Aristeas and Papias, the "Furietti Centaurs", which quickly became two of the most celebrated sculptures in Rome, in part through the engravings of them made in 1739 and 1740 under Furietti's supervision. Charles de Brosses saw them displayed in Monsignor Furietti's apartments in the Palazzo Montecitorio in 1739-40, and Francesco de' Ficoroni described them in Furietti's collection in 1744. Furietti habitually employed Bartolomeo Cavaceppi as a restorer, hence some of the pieces that had passed through Cavaceppi's studio were illustrated from Furietti's former collection in Cavaceppi's self-promoting volume of plates, Raccolta d'antiche statue, busti, teste cognite ed altre sculpture antiche, 1768.

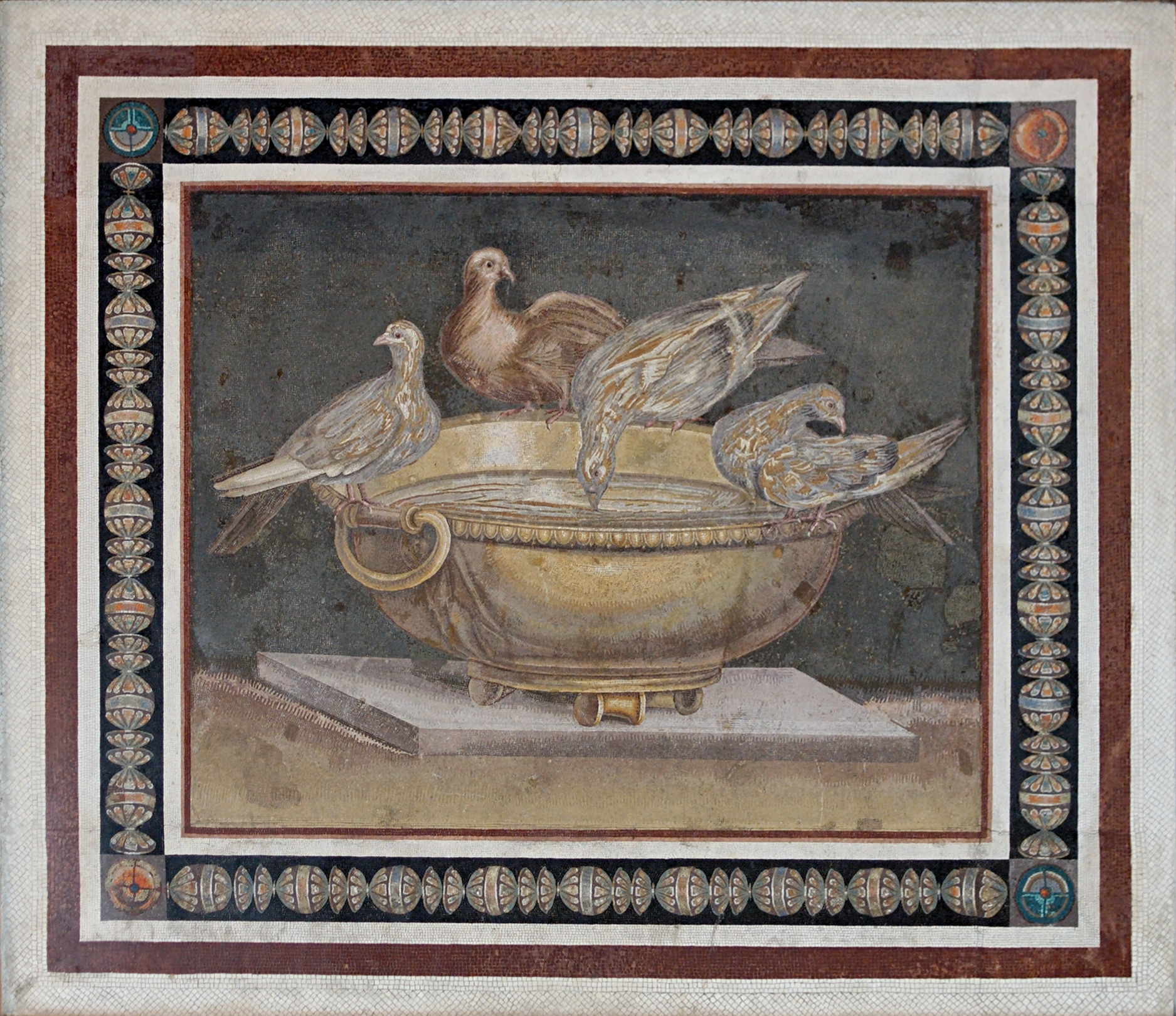
The "Dove Basin", attributed by Furietti to Sosius/Sosos (Capitoline Museums).

Among the mosaics he found at Hadrian's Villa is the celebrated one of four doves drinking, found in 1737; Furietti was convinced that it was the very work executed by Sosius/Sosos at Pergamum, mentioned by Pliny the Elder (Pliny's Natural History XXXVI,.25). It was the first plate in his book on mosaics, De Musivis (Rome, 1752), with six engraved plates, four of them folding, which became a classic on the subject. The work begins with a chapter on the etymology of the Latin word for mosaic (citing its use in inscriptions) and the origin and early history of mosaics. Furietti then devotes a chapter each to mosaics from the Roman Republic, from the Empire, from the age of Constantine to the 10th century, and from then until his own time. After Furietti's death, his heirs sold the two centaurs and the mosaic for 14,000 scudi, to the Museo Clementino.

Furietti was also a bibliophile. He edited and published the works of two of his compatriots, Gasparino and Guiniforte Barzizza, and the poems of Publio Fontana, prefacing the volumes with brief vite. His personal library he bequeathed to his native Bergamo, with the obligation that it be open to the citizens. It became the nucleus of the Biblioteca Civica Angelo Mai; there some of Furietti's correspondence is preserved.

His tomb is in the Roman church of the Bergamaschi, Santi Bartolomeo ed Alessandro dei Bergamaschi, also called Santa Maria della Pietà.

The early biography is G. Gallizioli, Memorie per servire alla storia della vita, degli studi e degli scritti del cardinale Giuseppe Alessandro Furietti, (Lucca) 1790.

== Sources ==
- Moroni, Gaetano (1844). Dizionario di erudizione storico-ecclesiastica da S. Pietro sino ai nostri giorni. Vol. 28. Venice: Tip. Emiliana. pp. 75–77.
- Haskell, Francis; Penny, Nicholas (1981). Taste and the Antique: The Lure of Classical Sculpture 1500-1900. New Haven: Yale University Press.
- Miranda, Salvador. "FURIETTI, Giuseppe Alessandro (1684-1764)". The Cardinals of the Holy Roman Church. Florida International University. OCLC 53276621.
- Sonzogni, Ivano (1994). "Una Biblioteca per i bergamaschi di gran talento, il cardinale Furietti e la fondazione della Civica". "Bergomum", Bollettino della Civica Biblioteca. 2: 5–46.
- Sonzogni, Ivano (1996). "Il carteggio Alessandro Furietti - Pierantonio Serassi". "Bergomum", Bollettino della Civica Biblioteca. 2: 91–188.
