= Palazzo Ghirlanda-Silva =

Coordinates: 45.55131°N 9.30222°E

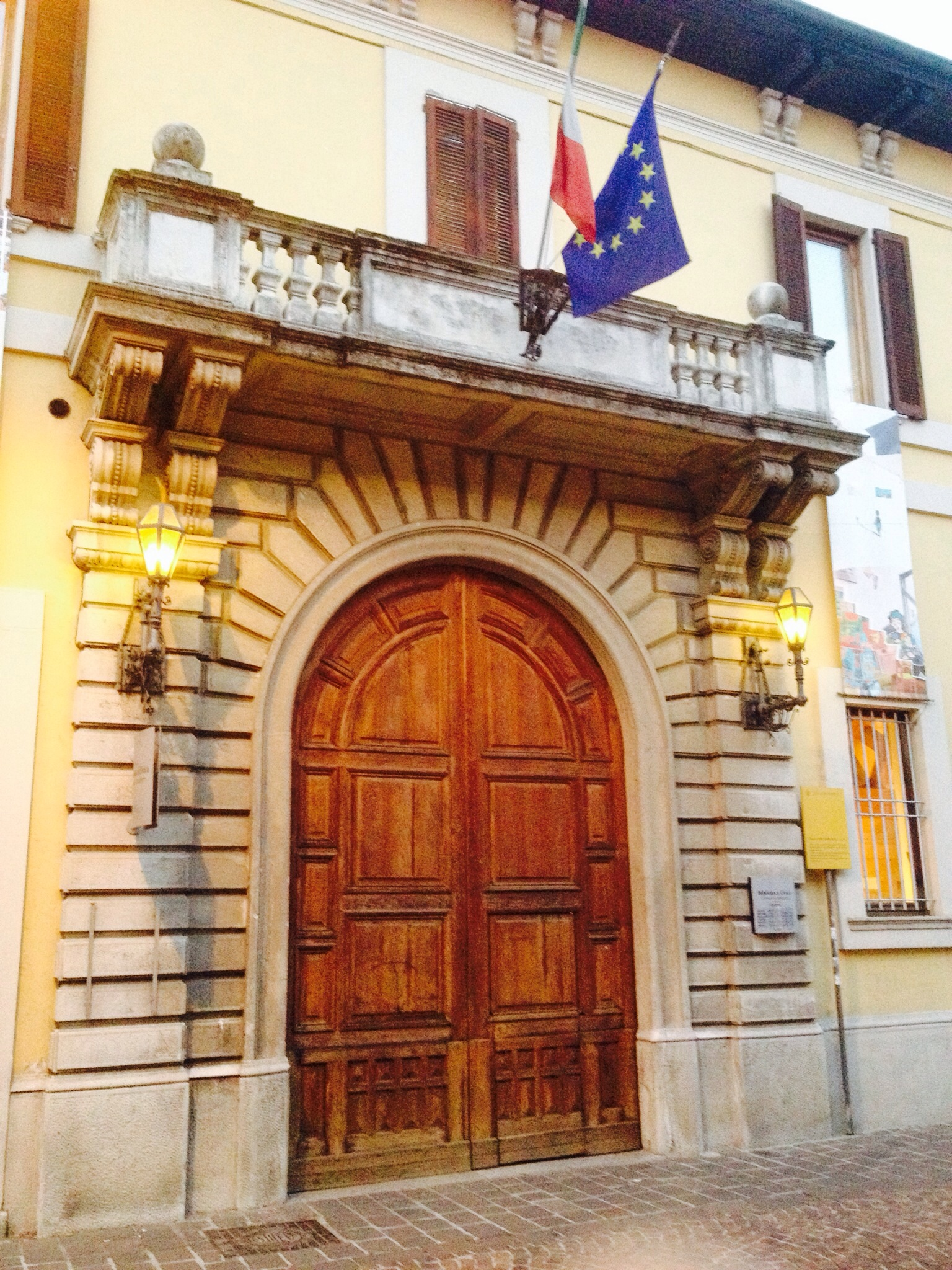
- Palazzo Ghirlanda-Silva: main entrance
- Interactive map of the Palazzo Ghirlanda-Silva area

General information
- Type: Public library
- Architectural style: Neoclassical
- Location: via Italia, 27, Brugherio, Italy
- Construction started: 16th century
- Owner: Municipality of Brugherio

Height
- Top floor: 2

Technical details
- Floor area: 1992 square meters
- Lifts/elevators: 2

The Palazzo Ghirlanda-Silva (Ghirlanda Silva Mansion) is a patrician building in the old town of Brugherio in the region of Lombardy, Italy. Built in the first half of the nineteenth century, it now houses the public library. It has an area of 1,992 m^{2} (21,440 sq ft), of which 1,407 m^{2} (15,140 sq ft) are used for library services, with the remaining space providing an exhibition room, an auditorium and offices.

== History ==
=== Origins ===
The original palazzo, dating from the eighteenth century, was located in the Municipality of Cassina Baraggia, and, along with Villa Fiorita, which now houses the City Hall, was first owned by the Counts Scotti. In 1778, Giovanni Battista Scotti sold the property to Gaspare Ghirlanda Silva of Milan, from whom the building now takes its name.

=== From Ghirlanda Silva's property to Brugherio Municipality ===
On 14 December 1872, Carlo Ghirlanda Silva, who had run up extensive debts, was forced to sell the building. It was sold as two separate lots, one of which was bought by the Municipality of Brugherio, and the other by Paolo Alberti (Ghirlanda Silva's estate manager, mill owner and town councillor of the Municipality of Cassina Baraggia), while the garden adjoining Noseda Square (now called Cesare Battisti Square) was bought by Cavalier Noseda. The Municipality of Brugherio bought the "public part with the courtyard and the garden", and Paolo Alberti bought the "remaining buildings, the farm house, and the rest of the garden to the south".

=== 20th and 21st centuries ===
Until the end of the 19th century, the Palazzo Ghirlanda-Silva housed the municipal offices, an elementary school and after 1904, a kindergarten. In 1960, the civic library of Brugherio was established in the building. The palace underwent several restorations in the second half of the 20th century: 1970, 1982 and 1998 to 2003 (for structural repairs). Since the last restoration, the Palazzo has been used as a library, auditorium and exhibition site.

== Description ==
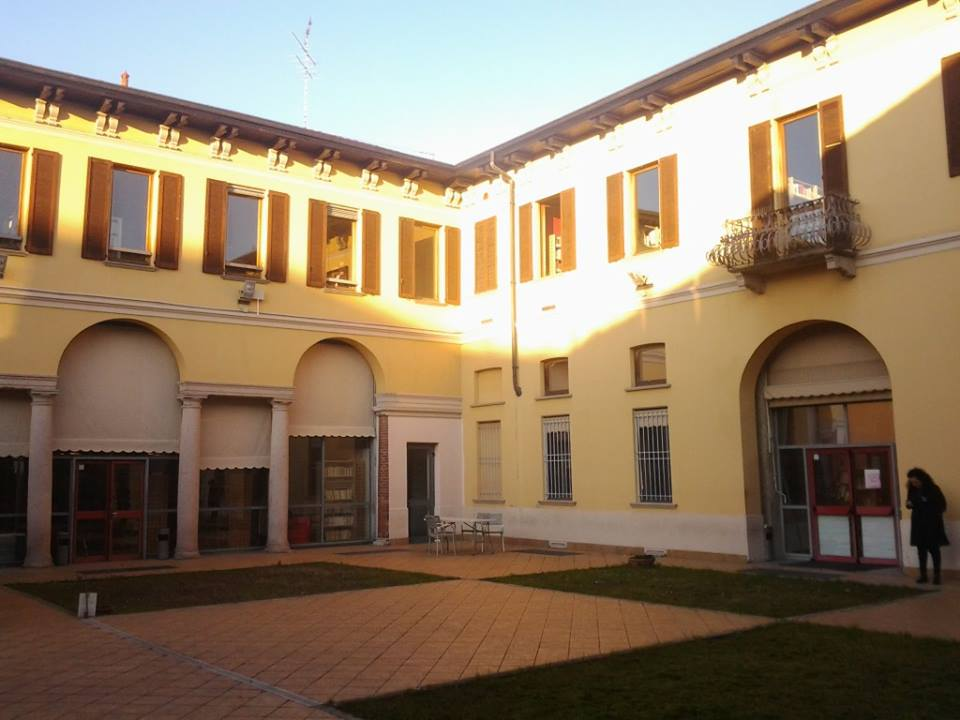
Palazzo Ghirlanda-Silva inner courtyard

The building is in the 18th-century Neoclassical style. Its layout is U-shaped: the main façade faces Via Italia (formerly Via Unione) while the rear walls face a garden with a twin-columned portico. The portico was once open but is now closed by a full-length window. Outside the garden there is a balcony in wrought iron. The facade is composed of a monumental main door above which hangs a massive decorated balcony of 21st century construction. The roofing is in brick-tile.

Originally the site also contained a farmhouse and stables, along with a large garden in back, an extensive tract of cultivated land in front, and a grove of mulberry trees. In the 1794 Cronaca by parish priest Paolo Antonio De Petri, the palace was described as follows:

De Petri, Paolo Antonio (1753), Cronaca, "Around the garden there is a twin-columned portico, apartments above and below, stables, hay lofts and sheds. There is a wine press and vats, wine cellars and lofts, a warehouse and farm house. Outside the enclosure, facing the south-west gardens irrigated by the river Gallarana, there stands a park with an avenue of apple trees. There is also a "crottino" with an icehouse. In 1753 the large garden of the palace held an exhibition of public abundance, financed by the Marquess Pallavicini; not only did everyone enjoy themselves, but prayers were also offered in the private chapel."

During the first half of the 19th century the property extended from Via Unione to Piazza Noseda. The two walls that currently stand to the south and west of the Palazzo were built only after the property was sold and divided up in 1872.

== See also ==
- Villa Fiorita

== Bibliography ==
- Biblioteca, la seconda casa dei cittadini: mezzo secolo di storia della Biblioteca Civica di Brugherio raccontata dai Brugheresi (DVD) (in Italian). Brugherio: Comune di Brugherio. 2010.
- Brugherio: i suoi luoghi, la sua storia: 225. anniversario del primo volo italiano in mongolfiera con uomini a bordo (in Italian). Brugherio: Comune di Brugherio. 2009.
- Tribuzio Zotti, Luciana (1986). Brugherio nei documenti (in Italian). Brugherio: Musicografica Lombarda.
- Tribuzio Zotti, Luciana (1987). Brugherio: luoghi memorabili (in Italian). Brugherio: Parole Nuove.
- Tribuzio Zotti, Luciana; Magni, Giuseppe (2012). Una città nel segno dei Magi: Brugherio 1613-2013 (in Italian). Brugherio: Associazione Kairos.
- Ritorno al futuro: la rinnovata Biblioteca Civica si presenta (DVD) (in Italian). Brugherio: Comune di Brugherio. 2004.
