= Biblioteca Civica Centrale (Turin) =

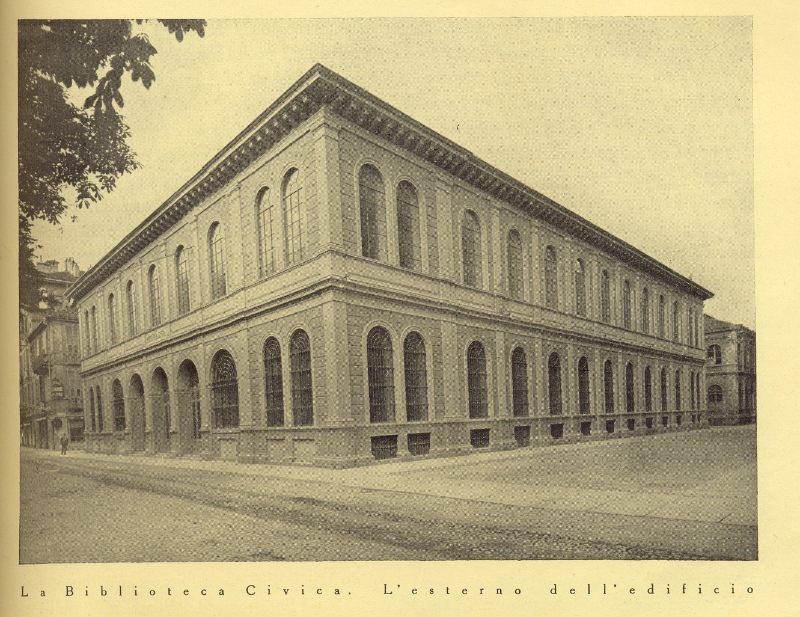
The facade of the Central Civic Library of Turin in 1929. Side towards Corso Palestro and Via Bertrandi

The Biblioteca Civica Centrale of Turin, Italy, is a public library established in 1869. It belongs to the Biblioteche Civiche Torinesi library system. Among its collections are manuscripts produced by Vincenzo Gioberti.

== Bibliography ==
in English

- Ennio Sandal (1990). "Endowed Municipal Public Libraries". Libraries & Culture. 25 (3: Libraries and Librarianship in Italy). USA: 358–371. JSTOR 25542275.
- Paul Oskar Kristeller (1998). "Torino". Iter Italicum: a finding list of uncatalogued or incompletely catalogued humanistic manuscripts of the Renaissance in Italian and other libraries. Vol. 2: Italy O-V (3rd ed.). Brill. pp. 178+. ISBN 9004012559.

in Italian

- Carola Picchetto (1982). "Le edizioni piemontesi del seicento della Biblioteca civica di Torino". Bollettino Storico-Bibliografico Subalpino (in Italian). 80. ISSN 0391-6715.
