= Marco Publio Fontana =

Italian humanist and poet

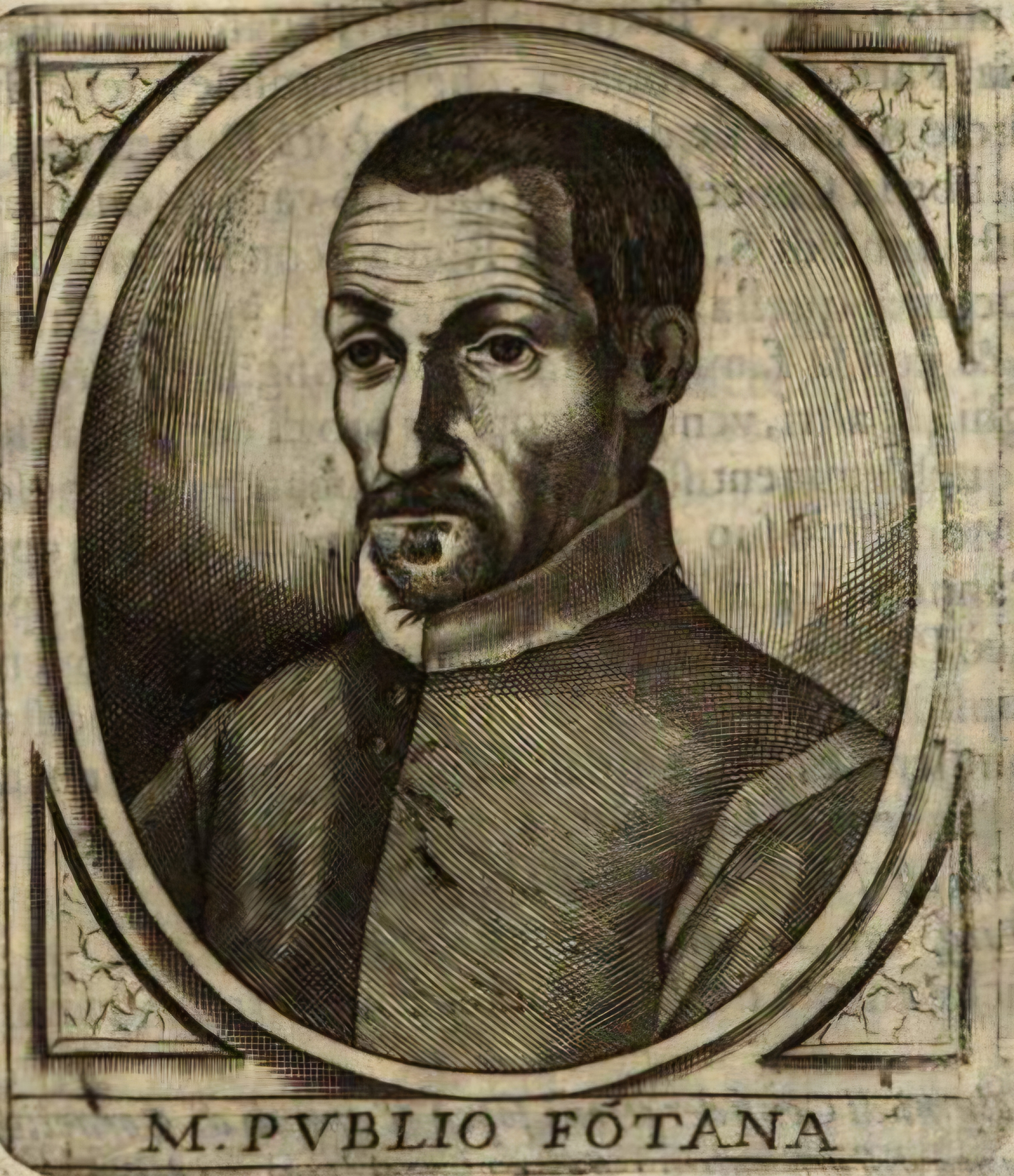
- Born: 18 January 1548; Palosco, Republic of Venice
- Died: 10 November 1609 (aged 61); Desenzano del Garda, Republic of Venice
- Resting place: Church of San Lorenzo, Desenzano del Garda
- Occupations: Catholic priest; Writer; Poet
- Writing career
- Language: Latin; Italian
- Period: 16th century
- Genres: Poetry; treatise
- Notable works: Apotheosis of Tasso; Delphinis
- Literary movement: Renaissance humanism

Marco Publio Fontana (18 January 1548 – 10 November 1609) was an Italian Renaissance humanist and poet, fellow townsman and friend of Torquato Tasso. He wrote the Apotheosis of Tasso, a poem which extended his reputation through all Italy. His most popular work is Delphinis, a Latin poem (1582).

== Biography ==
Marco Publio Fontana was born at Palosco, in the diocese of Brescia, in 1548. He was carefully educated by his father, Gianfrancesco, and by Pietro Rossi, receiving a most thorough training in Greek and Latin literature, especially in the poets (above all, Virgil). For mathematics, philosophy, and eventually medicine, he was sent to Brescia, but continued to study the poets, as he did after transferring his interest to theology and the Church Fathers.

The first collected edition of his Latin poems (Bergamo, 1752) runs to well over three hundred pages. The chief work is the Delphinis in three books, a mythological epic of very little but historical interest today. This is followed by five books of Heroica carmina (verse epistles, epicedia, and the like). Besides Horatian lyrics, hendecasyllabics, and a hexameter poem on the birth of Christ, there is also the Pastoralia carmina — six eclogues and three lusus pastorales.

The fifth eclogue (Doris et Alcon; 78 hexameters) is a love-story. The sixth eclogue (Caprea, "The She-Goat"; 103 hexameters) was a pastoral elegy composed on the death of a friend's pet goat.

Marco Publio Fontana died on November 10, 1609. After his death the treatise Del proprio et ultimato fine del poeta was published (Bergamo 1615). His Latin poems, collected by Marco Antonio Foppa, were published with the title Poemata omnia, by Pierantonio Serassi in Bergamo in 1752, together with a Vita di Marco Publio Fontana by cardinal Giuseppe Alessandro Furietti.

“Fontana is one of the modern poets," says Gian Vittorio Rossi, "who have approached nearest to Virgil in beauty of imagery and harmony of diction."

== Bibliography ==
- Grant, William Leonard (1965). Neo-Latin Literature and the Pastoral. University of North Carolina Press. pp. 159–160.
- Formichetti, Gianfranco (1997). "FONTANA, Marco Publio". Dizionario Biografico degli Italiani (in Italian). Vol. 48: Filoni–Forghieri. Rome: Istituto dell'Enciclopedia Italiana. ISBN 978-88-12-00032-6.
- Thomas, Joseph (1892). "Fontana (PUBLIO)". The Universal Dictionary of Biography and Mythology. J.B. Lippincott. p. 1010.
