= Biblioteca Civica di Padova =

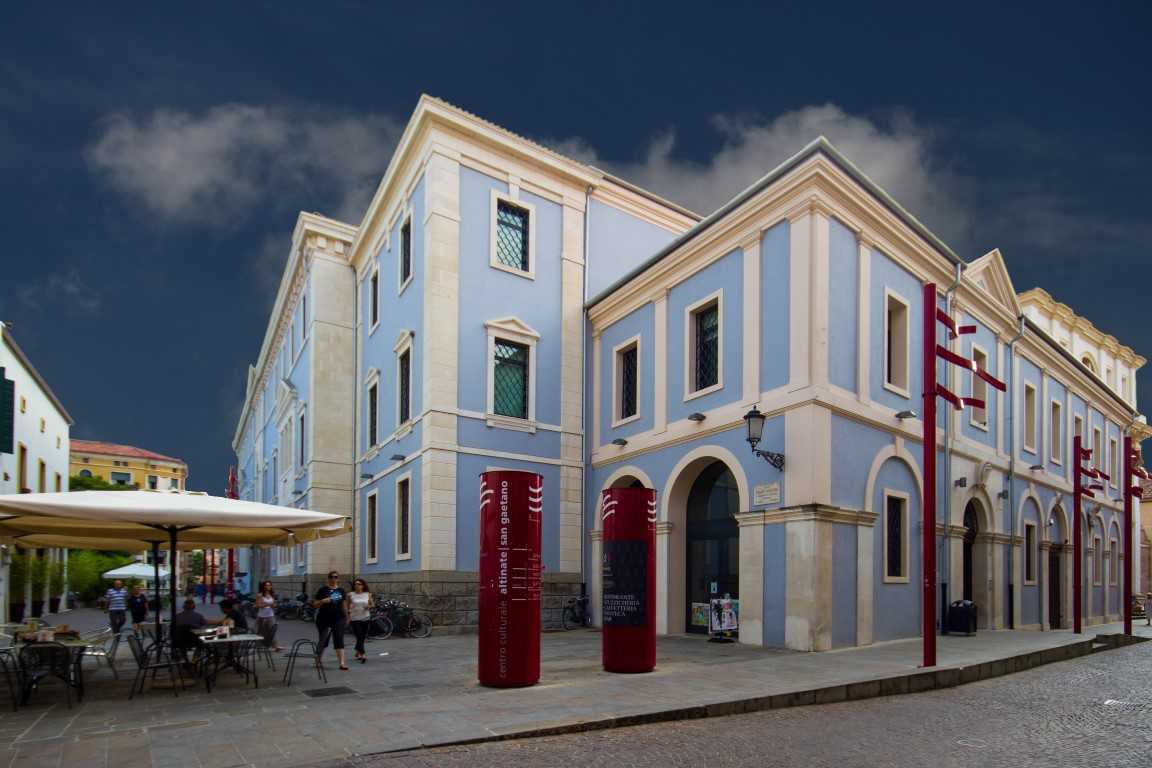
Centro Culturale San Gaetano in Padua, which houses part of the Biblioteca Civica (photo 2013)

The Biblioteca Civica of Padua, Italy, is a public library founded in 1839 by Gerolamo Polcastro. Since 2009 it operates from headquarters in the Centro culturale Altinate/San Gaetano. Its collections include manuscripts produced by Alberto Fortis.

Together with the University Library of Padua, the oldest one, it is among the main sites of bibliographic preservation in Padua, as well as the coordinating center of the Urban Library System; eight libraries, a newspaper library and a media library that share the same catalog are part of the System.

The name "civic" underscores the primary goal of this institution since its founding: to be a service of the city, working for its citizens. The Library holds more than 500,000 volumes, 5,000 manuscripts, 323 incunabula, 2,000 periodicals, and an iconographic collection of 12,000 items, many of which document the events of Padua and its surroundings at the turn of World War I.

== History ==
The Civic Library of Padua was not born as a single entity: its origin, as is often the case with libraries, is linked to the establishment of the Civic Museum and the Archives of the City of Padua. The vicissitudes of these three repositories of knowledge are intertwined, so much so that the library is also known as the Museum Library.

The Museum was officially inaugurated in 1825 with the display of Giuseppe Furlanetto's epigraphic collection in the outer loggias of the Palazzo della Ragione. In addition to this core of ancient materials, the Municipality had an increasingly rich collection of works and art objects that remained unattended after the closing of convents, such as that of St. John of Verdara in 1780. Specifically, after the suppression of the convent, there were paintings, majolica and medals of high value scattered in different sites of the city, without any criteria of organization and protection.

The origins of the Library go back to a later date, 1839, the year in which Count Gerolamo Polcastro's will certifies the cession of his personal library to the City Council of the city: this donation thus constitutes the original nucleus of the Library, with respect to which no information is available prior to 1839. Enriched by the collection of his uncle Gian Domenico, Abbot Polcastro's corpus numbered more than 4,000 Greek and Latin classical volumes, which in 1842 were deposited in the halls of the City Hall.

Fundamental to the fortunes of the Library and Museum is the position of chancellor entrusted in 1845 to Andrea Gloria (Padua, July 22, 1821 - Padua, July 31, 1911), who is entrusted by the City Council with the task of arranging the catalogs and inventories concerning the contents of the Archive (until then in the charge of Antonio Cecchini), the Polcastro library (already inherited by the city, but not yet sorted) and the art objects from the former convent San Giovanni da Verdara. Eleven years later A. Gloria obtained a license from the city to purchase Antonio Piazza's personal library, a rich collection of manuscripts, incunabula, maps and portraits of Paduan subjects.

== Bibliography ==
- Gilda P. Mantovani (2011). "Per Alberto Fortis (dalla raccolta di autografi della Biblioteca Civica di Padova)". Quaderni per la Storia della Universita di Padova (in Italian). 44. ISSN 0078-7760.
- "Gerolamo Polcastro", Dizionario Biografico degli Italiani (in Italian), 2015
