= List of Tetrablemmidae species =

This page lists all described species of the spider family Tetrablemmidae accepted by the World Spider Catalog as of February 2021:

== A ==
=== Ablemma ===
Ablemma

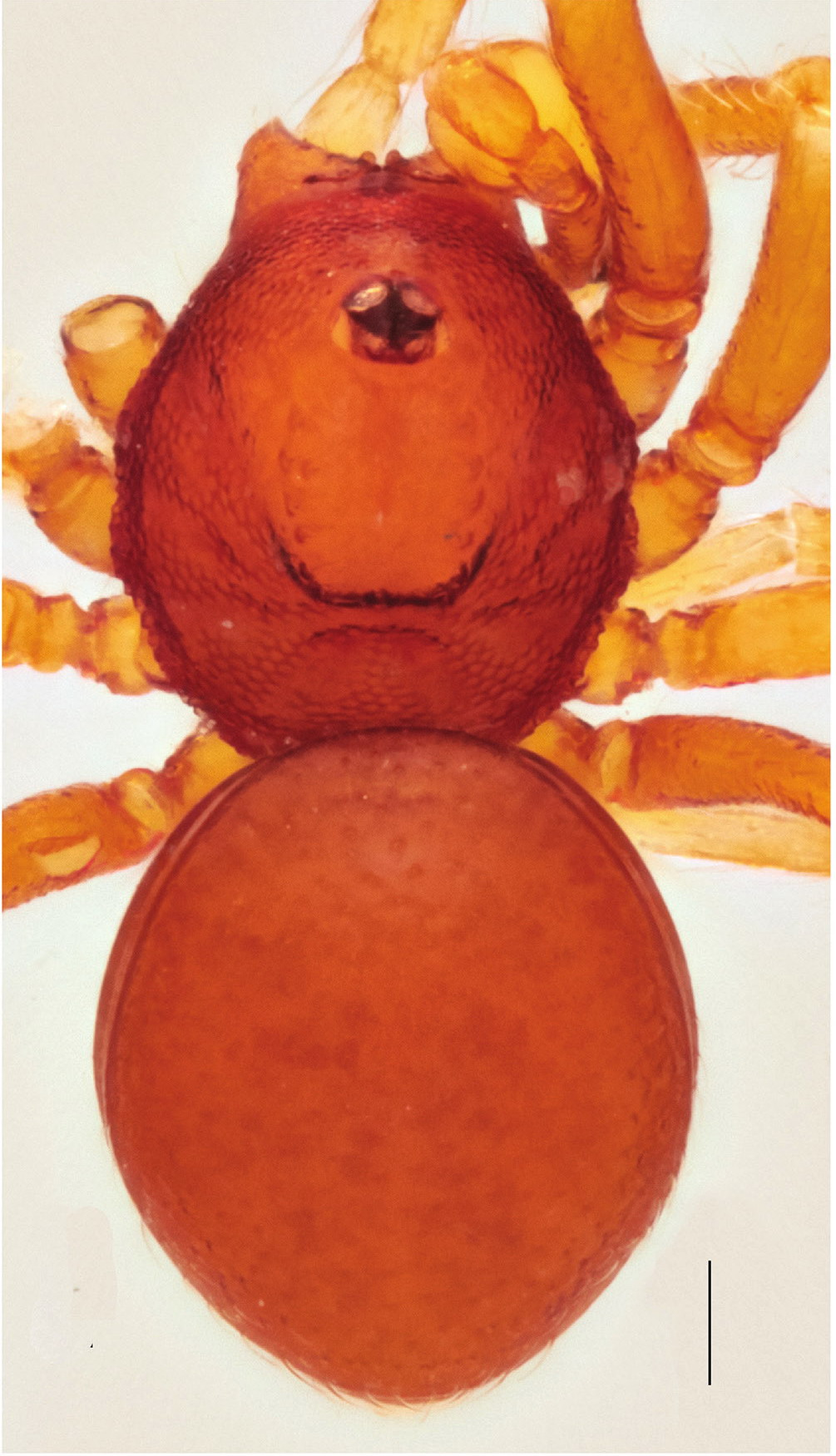
Ablemma andriana, male

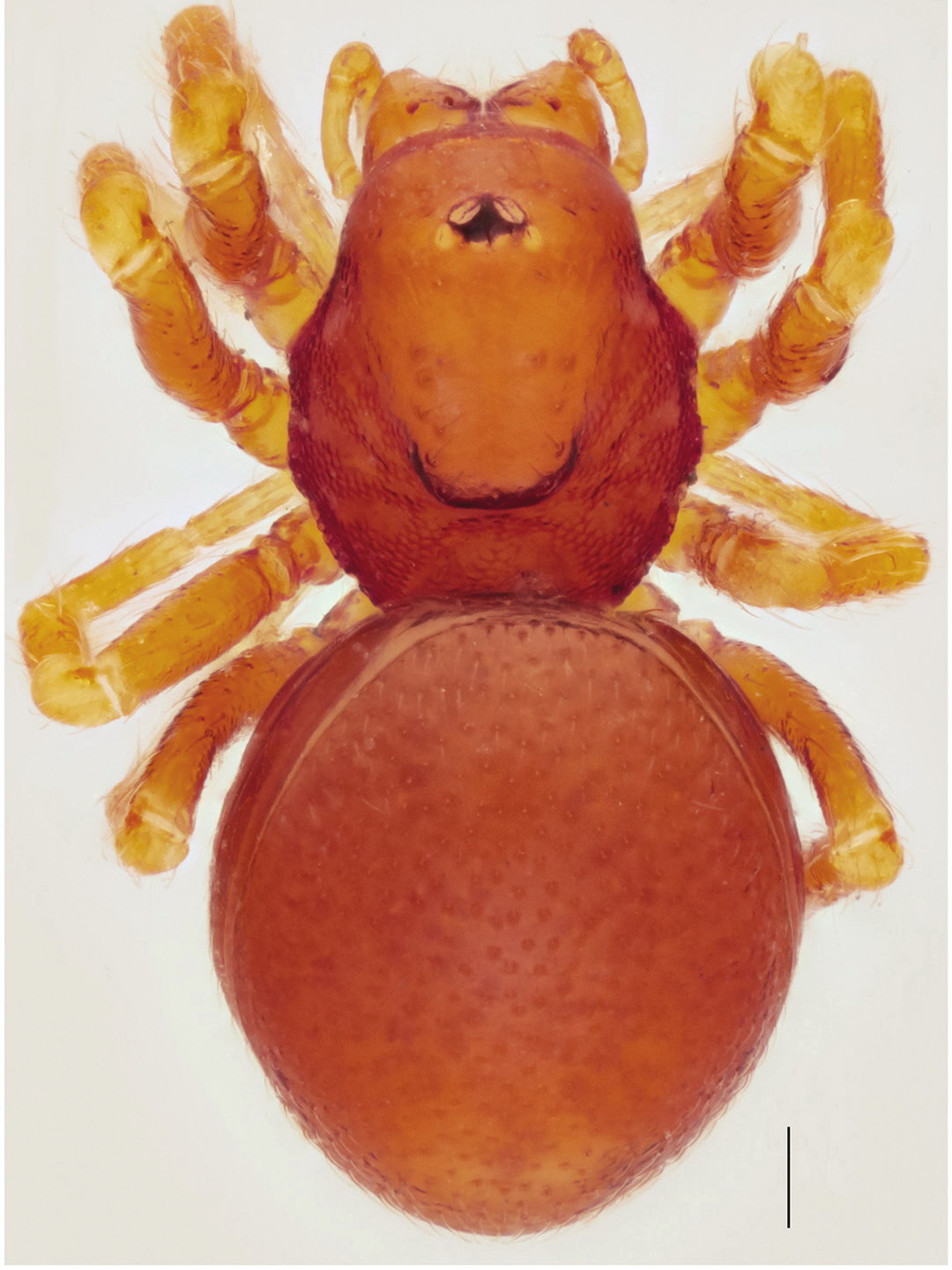
Ablemma singalang, female

Ablemma Roewer, 1963

- A. aiyura Shear, 1978 — New Guinea
- A. andriana Fardiansah & Dupérré, 2019 — Indonesia (Sumatra)
- A. baso Roewer, 1963 (type) — Indonesia (Sumatra)
- A. berryi Shear, 1978 — Caroline Is.
- A. circumspectans Deeleman-Reinhold, 1980 — Borneo
- A. contrita Fardiansah & Dupérré, 2019 — Indonesia (Sumatra)
- A. datahu Lehtinen, 1981 — Indonesia (Sulawesi)
- A. erna Lehtinen, 1981 — Indonesia (Sumatra)
- A. girinumu Lehtinen, 1981 — New Guinea
- A. gombakense Wunderlich, 1995 — Malaysia
- A. kaindi Lehtinen, 1981 — New Guinea
  - A. k. avios Lehtinen, 1981 — New Guinea
- A. kelinci Fardiansah & Dupérré, 2019 — Indonesia (Sumatra)
- A. lempake Lehtinen, 1981 — Borneo
- A. makiling Lehtinen, 1981 — Philippines
- A. malacca Lin & Li, 2017 — Singapore
- A. merotai Lehtinen, 1981 — Borneo
- A. prominens Tong & Li, 2008 — China
- A. pugnax (Brignoli, 1973) — New Guinea, Solomon Is.
- A. rarosae Lehtinen, 1981 — Philippines
- A. ruohomaekii Lehtinen, 1981 — Thailand
- A. samarinda Lehtinen, 1981 — Borneo
- A. sedgwicki Shear, 1978 — Borneo
- A. shimojanai (Komatsu, 1968) — Japan (Ryukyu Is.)
- A. singalang Lehtinen, 1981 — Indonesia (Sumatra)
- A. sternofoveatum Lehtinen, 1981 — Borneo
- A. syahdani Lehtinen, 1981 — Borneo
- A. unicornis Burger, 2008 — Malaysia

=== Afroblemma ===
Afroblemma Lehtinen, 1981

- A. thorelli (Brignoli, 1974) (type) — Angola, Tanzania
  - A. t. maniema Lehtinen, 1981 — Congo

=== Anansia ===
Anansia Lehtinen, 1981

- A. astaroth (Brignoli, 1974) (type) — Angola

== B ==
=== Bacillemma ===
Bacillemma Deeleman-Reinhold, 1993

- B. leclerci Deeleman-Reinhold, 1993 (type) — Thailand

=== † Balticoblemma ===
† Balticoblemma Wunderlich, 2004

- † B. unicorniculum Wunderlich, 2004

=== † Bicornoculus ===
† Bicornoculus Wunderlich, 2015 - Tetrablemminae

=== Borneomma ===
Borneomma Deeleman-Reinhold, 1980

- B. roberti Deeleman-Reinhold, 1980 (type) — Malaysia (Borneo)
- B. yuata Lehtinen, 1981 — Indonesia (Borneo)

=== † Brignoliblemma ===
† Brignoliblemma Wunderlich, 2017 - Tetrablemminae

=== Brignoliella ===
Brignoliella

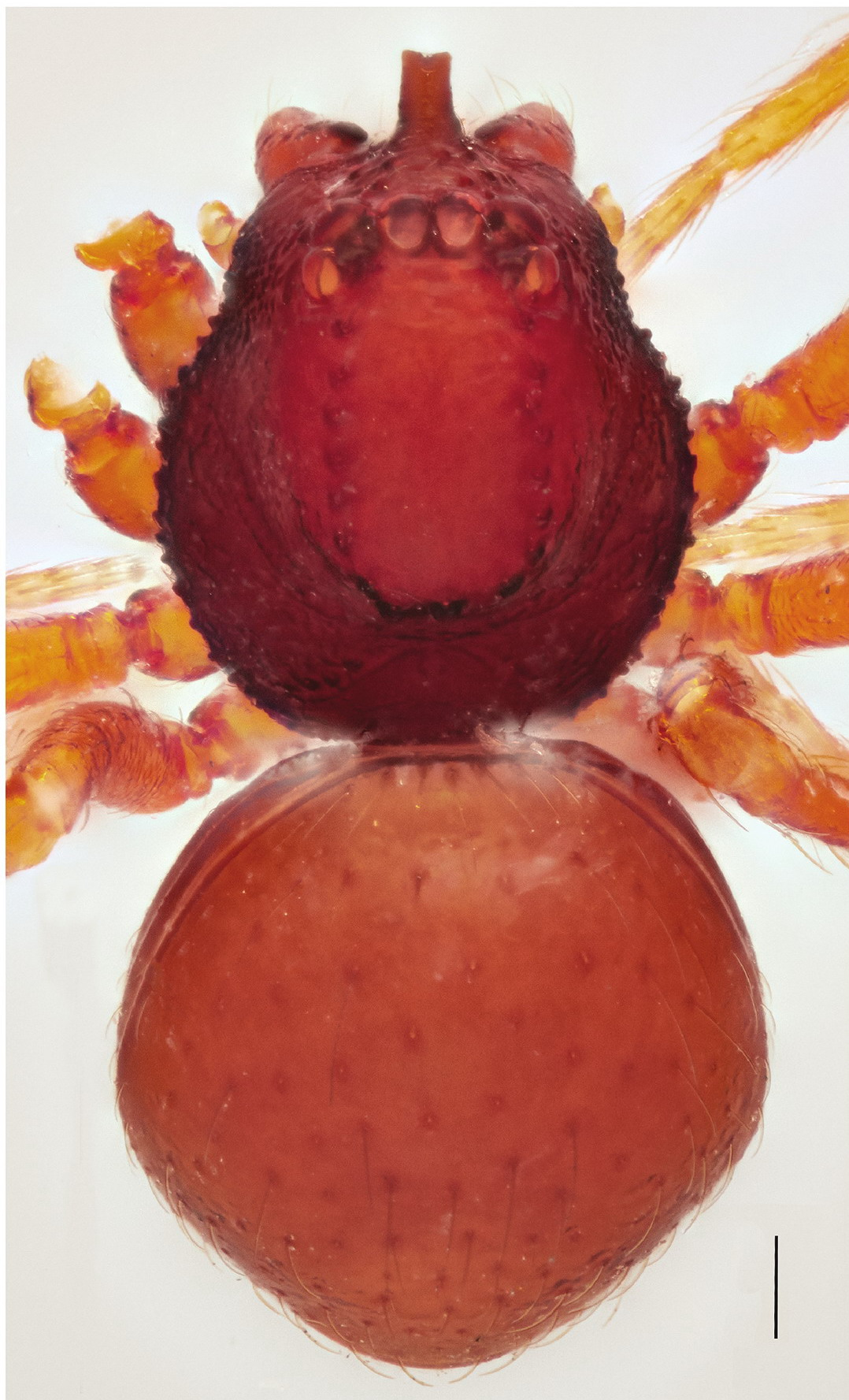
Brignoliella patmae, male

Brignoliella Shear, 1978

- B. acuminata (Simon, 1889) (type) — New Caledonia
- B. beattyi Shear, 1978 — Caroline Is.
- B. besuchetiana Bourne, 1980 — India
- B. besutensis Lin, Li & Jäger, 2012 — Malaysia, SIngapore
- B. bicornis (Simon, 1893) — Philippines
- B. caligiformis Tong & Li, 2008 — China
- B. carmen Lehtinen, 1981 — Philippines
- B. dankobiensis Bourne, 1980 — Papua New Guinea (New Ireland)
- B. delphina Deeleman-Reinhold, 1980 — New Guinea
- B. klabati Lehtinen, 1981 — Indonesia (Sulawesi)
- B. leletina Bourne, 1980 — Papua New Guinea (New Ireland)
- B. maoganensis Tong & Li, 2008 — China
- B. maros Lehtinen, 1981 — Indonesia (Sulawesi)
- B. martensi (Brignoli, 1972) — Nepal
- B. massai Lehtinen, 1981 — Indonesia (Sulawesi)
- B. michaeli Lehtinen, 1981 — Malaysia, Singapore
- B. patmae Fardiansah & Dupérré, 2019 — Indonesia (Sumatra)
- B. quadricornis (Roewer, 1963) — Caroline Is.
- B. ratnapura Shear, 1988 — Sri Lanka
- B. sarawak Shear, 1978 — Borneo
- B. scrobiculata (Simon, 1893) — Sri Lanka
- B. tao Ballarin & Yamasaki, 2021 — Taiwan (Orchid Is./Lanyu)
- B. trifida Lehtinen, 1981 — Borneo
- B. vitiensis Lehtinen, 1981 — Fiji
- B. vulgaris Lehtinen, 1981 — Borneo

== C ==
=== Caraimatta ===
Caraimatta Lehtinen, 1981

- C. blandini Lehtinen, 1981 — Mexico
- C. brescoviti García, Martínez & Ahumada-C., 2019 — Colombia
- C. cambridgei (Bryant, 1940) — Cuba, Jamaica, Mexico to Panama
- C. sbordonii (Brignoli, 1972) (type) — Mexico, Guatemala

=== Choiroblemma ===
Choiroblemma Bourne, 1980

- C. bengalense Bourne, 1980 (type) — India
- C. rhinoxunum Bourne, 1980 — India

=== Cuangoblemma ===
Cuangoblemma Brignoli, 1974

- C. machadoi Brignoli, 1974 (type) — Angola

=== † Cymbioblemma ===
† Cymbioblemma Wunderlich, 2017 - Tetrablemminae

== E ==
=== † Electroblemma ===
† Electroblemma Selden et al., 2016 - Tetrablemminae

=== † Eogamasomorpha ===
† Eogamasomorpha Wunderlich, 2008 - Tetrablemminae

== F ==
=== Fallablemma ===
Fallablemma Shear, 1978

- F. castaneum (Marples, 1955) (type) — Samoa
- F. greenei Lehtinen, 1981 — Indonesia (Sulawesi)

== G ==
=== Gunasekara ===
Gunasekara Lehtinen, 1981

- G. ramboda Lehtinen, 1981 (type) — Sri Lanka

== H ==
=== Hexablemma ===
Hexablemma Berland, 1920

- H. cataphractum Berland, 1920 (type) — Kenya

== I ==
=== Indicoblemma ===
Indicoblemma Bourne, 1980

- I. cruxi Lin & Li, 2010 — China
- I. lannaianum Burger, 2005 — Thailand
- I. monticola (Lehtinen, 1981) — Thailand
- I. sheari Bourne, 1980 (type) — India

== L ==
=== Lehtinenia ===
Lehtinenia Tong & Li, 2008

- L. arcus Lin & Li, 2010 — China
- L. bicornis Tong & Li, 2008 (type) — China
- L. bisulcus Lin, Pham & Li, 2009 — Vietnam

=== † Longissithorax ===
† Longissithorax Wunderlich, 2017 - Tetrablemminae

=== † Longithorax ===
† Longithorax Wunderlich, 2017

- † L. furca Wunderlich, 2017

== M ==
=== Maijana ===
Maijana Lehtinen, 1981

- M. rackae Lehtinen, 1981 (type) — Indonesia (Java)

=== Mariblemma ===
Mariblemma Lehtinen, 1981

- M. pandani (Brignoli, 1978) (type) — Seychelles

=== Matta ===
Matta Crosby, 1934

- M. angelomachadoi Brescovit, 2005 — Brazil
- M. cambito Brescovit & Cizauskas, 2019 — Brazil
- M. hambletoni Crosby, 1934 (type) — Brazil
- M. humhum Brescovit & Cizauskas, 2019 — Brazil
- M. humrrum Brescovit & Cizauskas, 2019 — Brazil
- M. mckenziei Shear, 1978 — Mexico
- M. nuusga Brescovit & Cizauskas, 2019 — Brazil
- M. pititinha Brescovit & Cizauskas, 2019 — Brazil
- M. teteia Brescovit & Cizauskas, 2019 — Brazil
- M. zuiuda Brescovit & Cizauskas, 2019 — Brazil

=== Micromatta ===
Micromatta Lehtinen, 1981

- M. atoma (Shear, 1978) (type) — Belize

=== Monoblemma ===
Monoblemma Gertsch, 1941

- M. becki Brignoli, 1978 — Brazil
- M. browni Shear, 1978 — Madagascar
- M. muchmorei Shear, 1978 — Virgin Is., Colombia
- M. unicum Gertsch, 1941 (type) — Panama
- † M. spinosum Wunderlich, 1988

== P ==
=== Pahanga ===
Pahanga Shear, 1979

- P. centenialis Lehtinen, 1981 — Malaysia
- P. diyaluma Lehtinen, 1981 — Sri Lanka
- P. dura Shear, 1979 (type) — Malaysia
- P. lilisari Lehtinen, 1981 — Indonesia (Sumatra)

=== † Palpalpaculla ===
† Palpalpaculla Wunderlich, 2017

- † P. pulcher Wunderlich, 2017

== R ==
=== Rhinoblemma ===
Rhinoblemma Lehtinen, 1981

- R. unicorne (Roewer, 1963) (type) — Caroline Is.

== S ==
=== † Saetosoma ===
† Saetosoma Wunderlich, 2012

- † S. filiembolus Wunderlich, 2012

=== Shearella ===
Shearella Lehtinen, 1981

- S. alii Sankaran & Sebastian, 2016 — India
- S. lilawati Lehtinen, 1981 (type) — Sri Lanka
- S. sanya Lin & Li, 2010 — China
- S. selvarani Lehtinen, 1981 — Sri Lanka

=== Sinamma ===
Sinamma Lin & Li, 2014

- S. oxycera Lin & Li, 2014 (type) — China

=== Singalangia ===
Singalangia Lehtinen, 1981

- S. sternalis Lehtinen, 1981 (type) — Indonesia (Sumatra)

=== Singaporemma ===
Singaporemma Shear, 1978

- S. adjacens Lehtinen, 1981 — Vietnam
- S. banxiaoense Lin & Li, 2014 — China
- S. bifurcatum Lin & Li, 2010 — China
- S. halongense Lehtinen, 1981 — Vietnam
- S. lenachanae Lin & Li, 2017 — Singapore
- S. singulare Shear, 1978 (type) — Singapore
- S. takense Yan & Lin, 2018 — Thailand
- S. wulongense Lin & Li, 2014 — China

=== Sulaimania ===
Sulaimania Lehtinen, 1981

- S. brevis Lin & Li, 2017 — Singapore
- S. vigelandi Lehtinen, 1981 (type) — Malaysia

== T ==
=== Tetrablemma ===
Tetrablemma

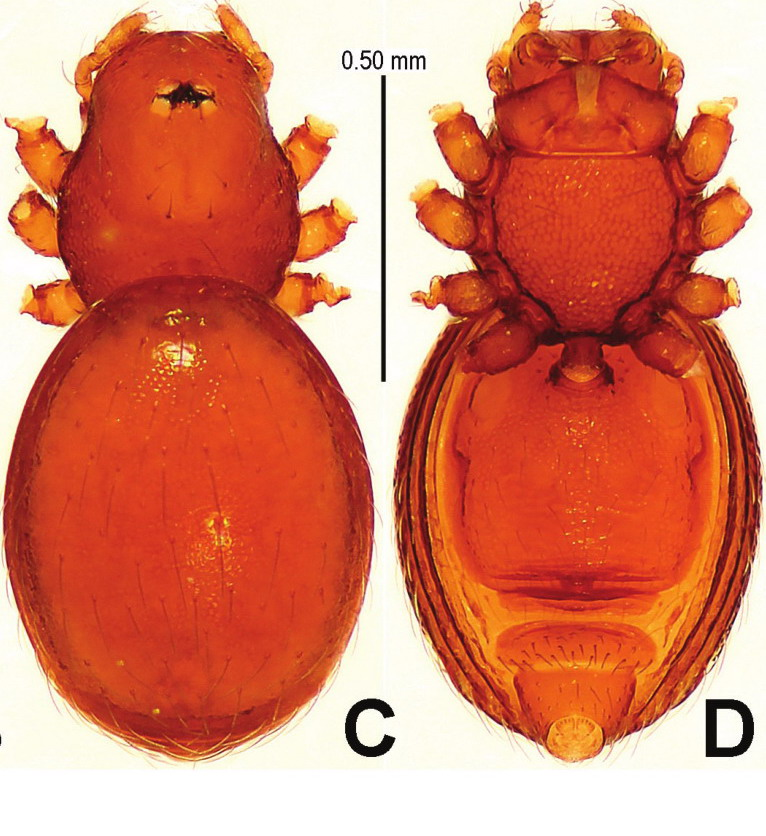
Tetrablemma ziyaoensis, female

Tetrablemma O. Pickard-Cambridge, 1873

- T. alaus Burger, Harvey & Stevens, 2010 — Australia (Western Australia)
- T. alterum Roewer, 1963 — Micronesia
- T. benoiti (Brignoli, 1978) — Seychelles
- T. brevidens Tong & Li, 2008 — China
- T. brignolii Lehtinen, 1981 — India
- T. deccanense (Tikader, 1976) — India
- T. extorre Shear, 1978 — Trinidad
- T. helenense Benoit, 1977 — St. Helena
- T. kepense Lin, Li & Jäger, 2018 — Cambodia
- T. loebli Bourne, 1980 — India
- T. magister Burger, 2008 — Australia (Queensland)
- T. manggarai Lehtinen, 1981 — Indonesia (Flores)
- T. marawula Lehtinen, 1981 — Indonesia (Sulawesi)
- T. mardionoi Lehtinen, 1981 — Indonesia (Sumatra)
- T. medioculatum O. Pickard-Cambridge, 1873 (type) — Sri Lanka
  - T. m. cochinense Lehtinen, 1981 — India
  - T. m. gangeticum Lehtinen, 1981 — India
- T. menglaense Lin & Li, 2014 — China
- T. mochima Martínez, Flórez-Daza & Brescovit, 2020 — Venezuela
- T. namkhan Lin, Li & Jäger, 2012 — Laos
- T. nandan Lin & Li, 2010 — China
- T. okei Butler, 1932 — Australia (Victoria)
- T. phulchoki Lehtinen, 1981 — Nepal
- T. rhinoceros (Brignoli, 1974) — Angola
- T. samoense Marples, 1964 — Samoa
- T. sokense Lin, Li & Jäger, 2018 — Cambodia
- T. tatacoa Martínez, Flórez-Daza & Brescovit, 2020 — Colombia
- T. thamin Labarque & Grismado, 2009 — Myanmar
- T. viduum (Brignoli, 1974) — Angola
- T. vietnamense Lehtinen, 1981 — Vietnam
- T. ziyaoense Lin & Li, 2014 — China

== U ==
=== † Uniscutosoma ===
† Uniscutosoma Wunderlich, 2015 - Tetrablemminae
