= Sulaimania =

Sulaimania may refer to:

- Sulaimania (plant), a plant genus in the mint family (Lamiaceae)
- Sulaimania (spider), a spider genus in the family Tetrablemmidae
- Sulaimania governorate, a governorate in Iraqi Kurdistan
  - Sulaymaniyah, a town in Iraq, capital of the Sulaimania governorate
  - Sulaimania University, a public university located in the city of Sulaymaniyah
