= Micromatta =

Scientific classification
- Kingdom: Animalia
- Phylum: Arthropoda
- Subphylum: Chelicerata
- Class: Arachnida
- Order: Araneae
- Infraorder: Araneomorphae
- Family: Tetrablemmidae
- Genus: Micromatta; Lehtinen, 1981
- Species: M. atoma

Binomial name
- Micromatta atoma (Shear, 1978)

Genus of spiders

Micromatta is a monotypic genus of Central American araneomorph spiders in the family Tetrablemmidae found in Belize. It contains the single species, Micromatta atoma, first described by W. A. Shear in 1978. Pekka T. Lehtinen transferred it to Micromatta in 1981 because the shapes of the male embolus and conductor are quite different than those of Matta and Caraimatta. Additionally, the plesiomorphic structure of pedipalp segments prove that the three genera aren't a paraphyletic group.

== See also ==
- Matta
- Tetrablemma
