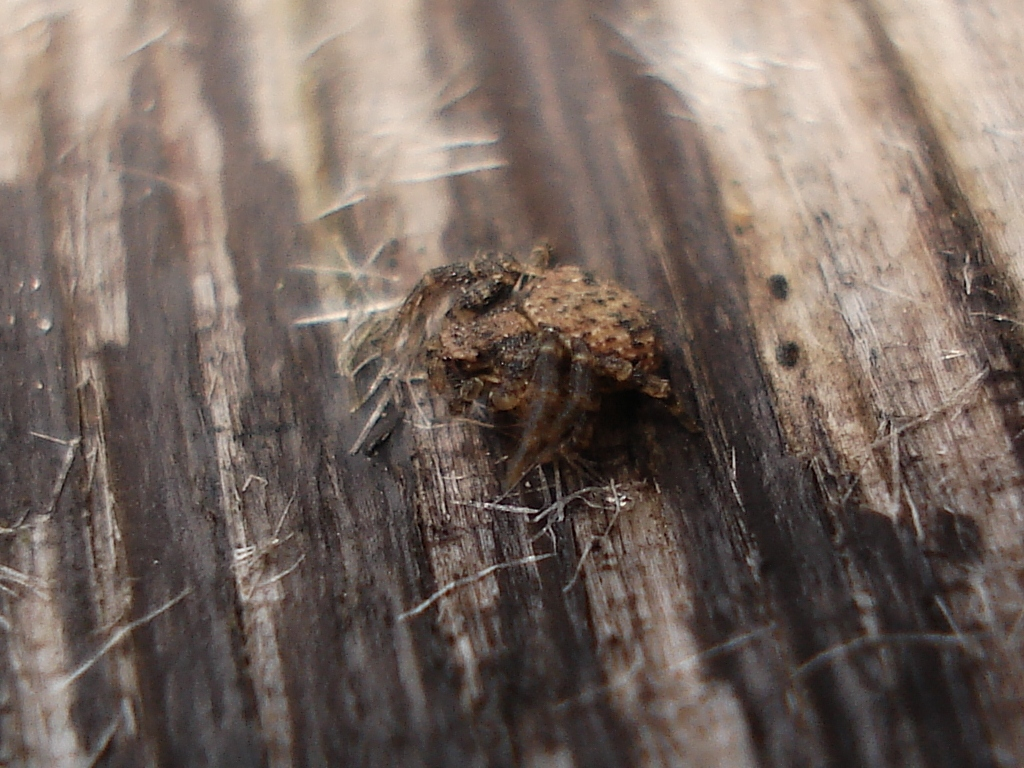
- C. blackwalli

Scientific classification
- Kingdom: Animalia
- Phylum: Arthropoda
- Subphylum: Chelicerata
- Class: Arachnida
- Order: Araneae
- Infraorder: Araneomorphae
- Family: Thomisidae
- Genus: Cozyptila; Lehtinen & Marusik, 2005

Type species
- C. blackwalli (Simon, 1875)

Species
- C. blackwalli (Simon, 1875) – Europe; C. guseinovorum Marusik & Kovblyuk, 2005 – Ukraine, Russia (Europe), Turkey, Caucasus; C. nigristernum (Dalmas, 1922) – Italy, Albania, Bulgaria, Greece, Cyprus, Turkey, Ukraine

= Cozyptila =

Genus of spiders

Cozyptila is a genus of crab spiders that was first described by Y. M. Marusik, Pekka T. Lehtinen & M. M. Kovblyuk in 2005. As of July 2020 it contains three species, found in Europe and on Cyprus: C. blackwalli, C. guseinovorum, and C. nigristernum.

== See also ==
- List of Thomisidae species
