= Nyctimus trimeni =

Zametopias Crab Spider

Scientific classification
- Kingdom: Animalia
- Phylum: Arthropoda
- Subphylum: Chelicerata
- Class: Arachnida
- Order: Araneae
- Infraorder: Araneomorphae
- Family: Thomisidae
- Genus: Nyctimus
- Species: N. trimeni

Binomial name
- Nyctimus trimeni (Simon, 1895)

Synonyms
- Zametopias trimeni Simon, 1895

Species of spider

Nyctimus trimeni is a spider in the family Thomisidae. It is endemic to South Africa and is commonly known as the Zametopias crab spider.

== Distribution ==
Nyctimus trimeni is found in South Africa. The type locality is given only as Bona Spei (Cape of Good Hope).

== Habitat and ecology ==
The life style of Nyctimus trimeni remains unknown.

== Conservation ==
Nyctimus trimeni is listed as Data Deficient for Taxonomic reasons by the South African National Biodiversity Institute. The species is known only from a single unspecified site in South Africa. More sampling is needed to collect males and determine the species range.

== Taxonomy ==
Nyctimus trimeni was originally described by Eugène Simon in 1895 as Zametopias trimeni. The species has not been revised and is known only from the female. Lehtinen transferred the species to Nyctimus in 2016.
