= Gunasekara ramboda =

Scientific classification
- Kingdom: Animalia
- Phylum: Arthropoda
- Subphylum: Chelicerata
- Class: Arachnida
- Order: Araneae
- Infraorder: Araneomorphae
- Family: Tetrablemmidae
- Genus: Gunasekara; Lehtinen, 1981
- Species: G. ramboda

Binomial name
- Gunasekara ramboda Lehtinen, 1981

Genus of spiders

Gunasekara is a monotypic genus of Sri Lankan araneomorph spiders in the family Tetrablemmidae containing the single species, Gunasekara ramboda. It was first described by Pekka T. Lehtinen in 1981, and is found in Sri Lanka.
