= Indicoblemma =

Scientific classification
- Kingdom: Animalia
- Phylum: Arthropoda
- Subphylum: Chelicerata
- Class: Arachnida
- Order: Araneae
- Infraorder: Araneomorphae
- Family: Tetrablemmidae
- Genus: Indicoblemma; Bourne, 1980

Type species
- I. sheari Bourne, 1980

Species
- 4, see text

Synonyms
- Chavia Lehtinen, 1981

Genus of spiders

Indicoblemma is a genus of Asian araneomorph spiders in the family Tetrablemmidae that was first described by J. D. Bourne in 1980. It is a senior synonym of Chavia. They are found in parts of India, China and Thailand.

== Species ==
As of September 2019 it contains four species, found in Asia:

- Indicoblemma cruxi Lin & Li, 2010 – China
- Indicoblemma lannaianum Burger, 2005 – Thailand
- Indicoblemma monticola (Lehtinen, 1981) – Thailand
- Indicoblemma sheari Bourne, 1980 (type) – India

== Description ==
They are yellow to brown, and have six eyes. The sternum has rough pits, that have fine setae at the points of fusion of these pits.
