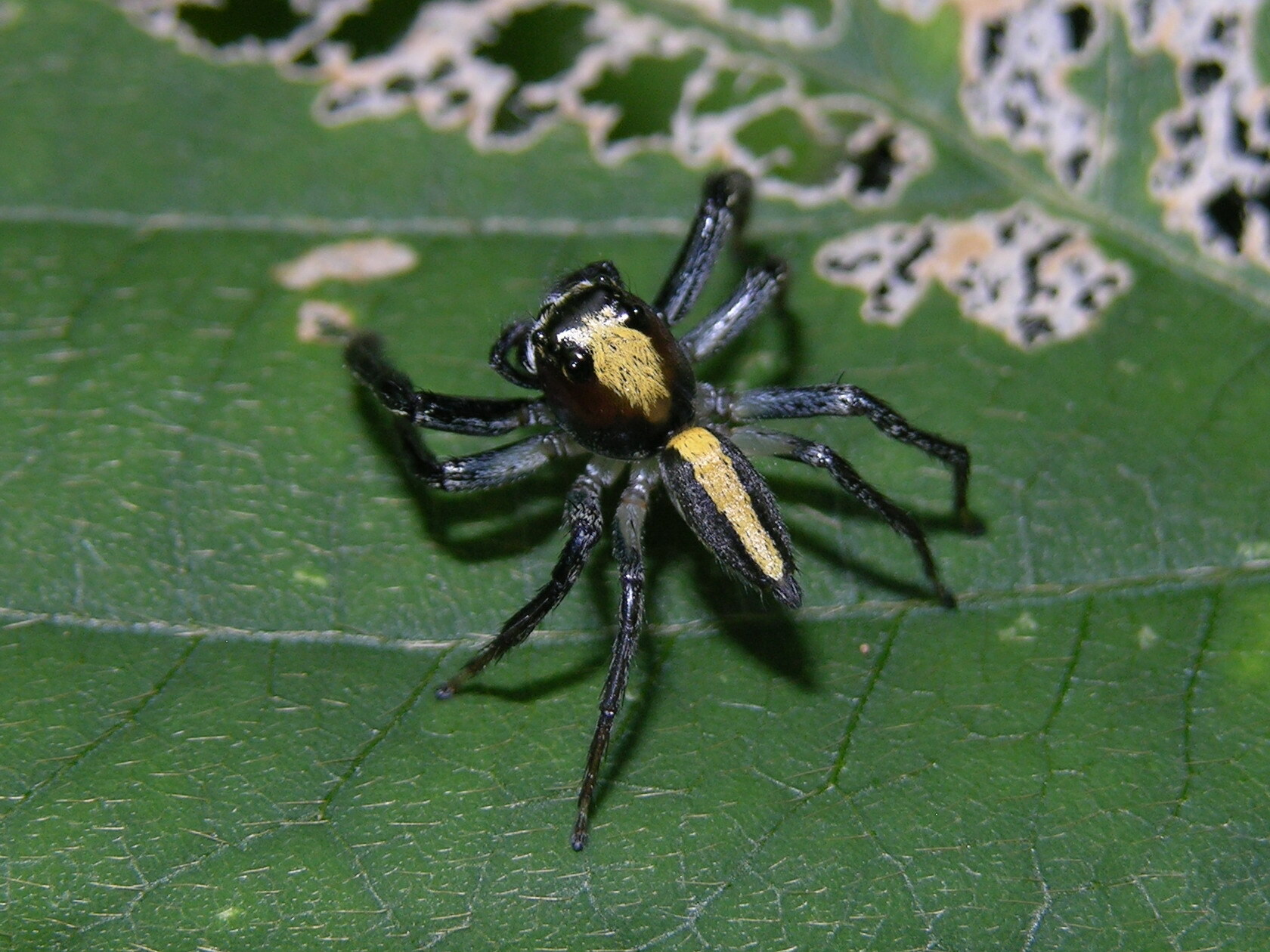
- male C. bilineatus from Thailand
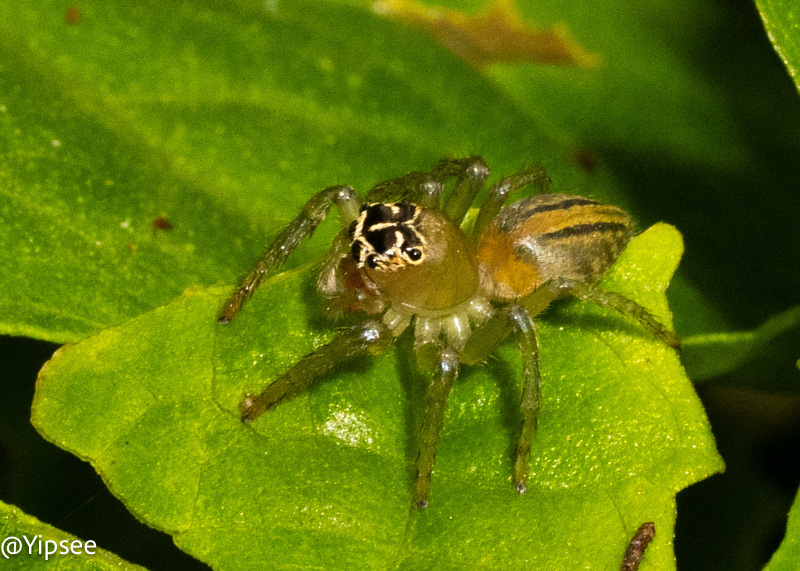
- female C. bilineatus from Thailand

Scientific classification
- Kingdom: Animalia
- Phylum: Arthropoda
- Subphylum: Chelicerata
- Class: Arachnida
- Order: Araneae
- Infraorder: Araneomorphae
- Family: Salticidae
- Subfamily: Salticinae
- Genus: Colyttus; Thorell, 1891

Type species
- C. bilineatus Thorell, 1891

Species
- 7, see text

Synonyms
- Donoessus Simon, 1902

= Colyttus =

Genus of spiders

Colyttus is a genus of Asian jumping spiders that was first described by Tamerlan Thorell in 1891. C. lehtinen is named in honor of Finnish arachnologist Pekka T. Lehtinen.

== Species ==
As of June 2019 it contains eight species, found only in Asia:

- Colyttus bilineatus Thorell, 1891 (type) – Indonesia (Sumatra, Moluccas)
- Colyttus kerinci (Prószyński & Deeleman-Reinhold, 2012) – Indonesia (Sumatra)
- Colyttus lehtineni Zabka, 1985 – China, Vietnam
- Colyttus nigriceps (Simon, 1899) – Indonesia (Sumatra)
- Colyttus proszynskii Caleb, Chatterjee, Tyagi, Kundu & Kumar, 2018 – India
- Colyttus robustus Zhang & Maddison, 2012 – Malaysia
- Colyttus striatus (Simon, 1902) – Borneo
- Colyttus yiwui Lin & Li, 2020 - China
