= Tetrablemma medioculatum =

Scientific classification
- Kingdom: Animalia
- Phylum: Arthropoda
- Subphylum: Chelicerata
- Class: Arachnida
- Order: Araneae
- Infraorder: Araneomorphae
- Family: Tetrablemmidae
- Genus: Tetrablemma
- Species: T. medioculatum

Binomial name
- Tetrablemma medioculatum O. Pickard-Cambridge, 1873

Species of spider

Tetrablemma medioculatum is a species of spider of the genus Tetrablemma. The nominate subspecies is endemic to Sri Lanka. Two other subspecies can be found, both of which are endemic to India.

== Subspecies ==
- Tetrablemma medioculatum cochinense Lehtinen, 1981 - India
- Tetrablemma medioculatum gangeticum Lehtinen, 1981 - India
- Tetrablemma medioculatum medioculatum - Sri Lanka
