= Pahanga =

Scientific classification
- Kingdom: Animalia
- Phylum: Arthropoda
- Subphylum: Chelicerata
- Class: Arachnida
- Order: Araneae
- Infraorder: Araneomorphae
- Family: Tetrablemmidae
- Genus: Pahanga; Shear, 1979

Type species
- P. dura Shear, 1979

Species
- 4, see text

Genus of spiders

Pahanga is a genus of Asian araneomorph spiders in the family Tetrablemmidae that was first described by W. A. Shear in 1979.

== Species ==
As of September 2019 it contains four species, found in Asia:

- Pahanga centenialis Lehtinen, 1981 – Malaysia
- Pahanga diyaluma Lehtinen, 1981 – Sri Lanka
- Pahanga dura Shear, 1979 (type) – Malaysia
- Pahanga lilisari Lehtinen, 1981 – Indonesia (Sumatra)
