= Borneomma =

Scientific classification
- Kingdom: Animalia
- Phylum: Arthropoda
- Subphylum: Chelicerata
- Class: Arachnida
- Order: Araneae
- Infraorder: Araneomorphae
- Family: Tetrablemmidae
- Genus: Borneomma; Deeleman-Reinhold, 1980

Type species
- B. roberti Deeleman-Reinhold, 1980

Species
- B. roberti Deeleman-Reinhold, 1980 – Borneo; B. yuata Lehtinen, 1981 – Borneo

Genus of spiders

Borneomma is a genus of Indonesian araneomorph spiders in the family Tetrablemmidae that was first described by Christa Laetitia Deeleman-Reinhold in 1980. As of September 2019, it contains two species, found on Borneo: B. roberti and B. yuata.
