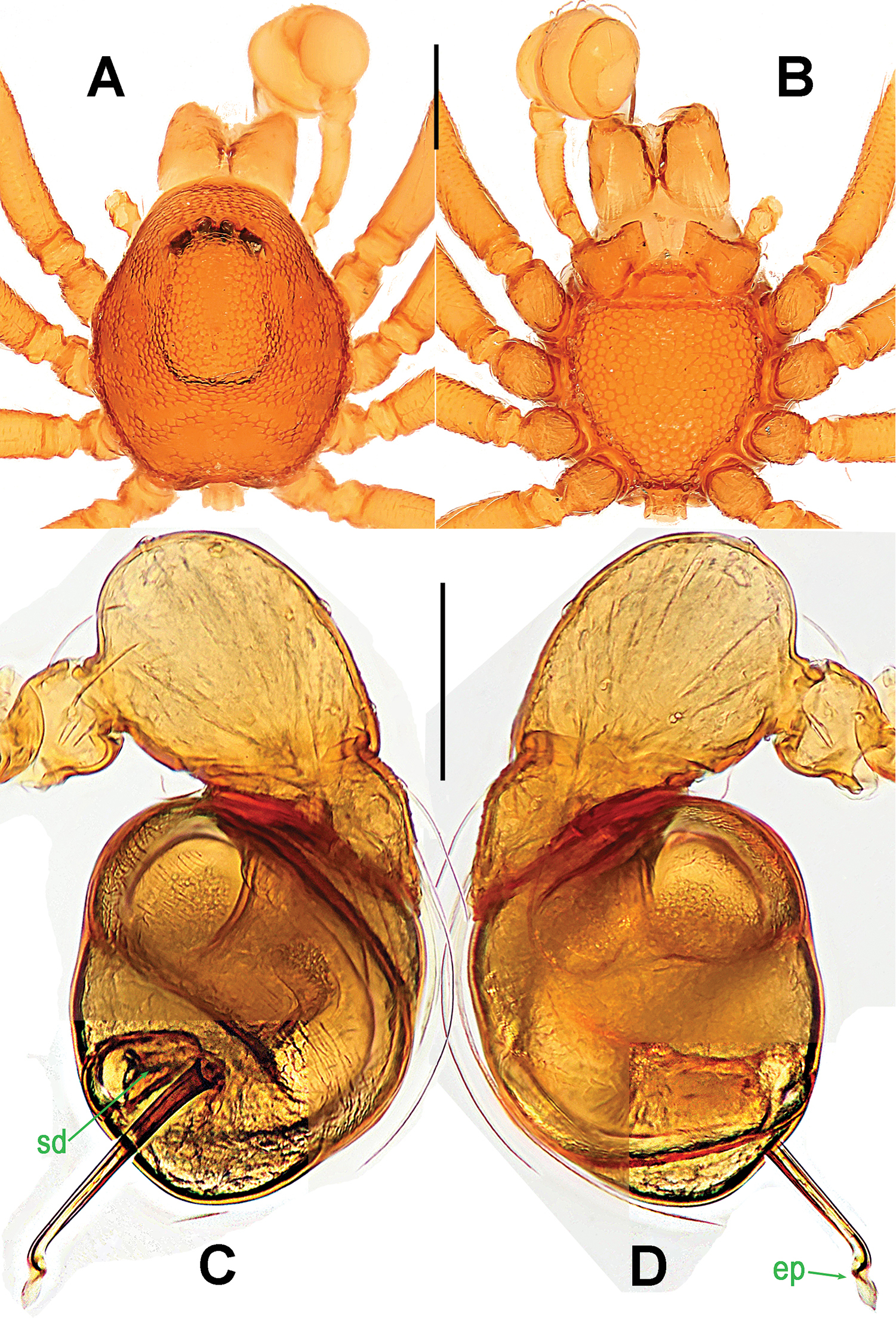
- Singaporemma halongense

Scientific classification
- Kingdom: Animalia
- Phylum: Arthropoda
- Subphylum: Chelicerata
- Class: Arachnida
- Order: Araneae
- Infraorder: Araneomorphae
- Family: Tetrablemmidae
- Genus: Singaporemma; Shear, 1978

Type species
- S. singulare Shear, 1978

Species
- 8, see text

= Singaporemma =

Genus of spiders

Singaporemma is a genus of Asian araneomorph spiders in the family Tetrablemmidae that was first described by W. A. Shear in 1978.

== Species ==
As of September 2019 it contains eight species, found in Asia:

- Singaporemma adjacens Lehtinen, 1981 – Vietnam
- Singaporemma banxiaoense Lin & Li, 2014 – China
- Singaporemma bifurcatum Lin & Li, 2010 – China
- Singaporemma halongense Lehtinen, 1981 – Vietnam
- Singaporemma lenachanae Lin & Li, 2017 – Singapore
- Singaporemma singulare Shear, 1978 (type) – Singapore
- Singaporemma takense Yan & Lin, 2018 – Thailand
- Singaporemma wulongense Lin & Li, 2014 – China
