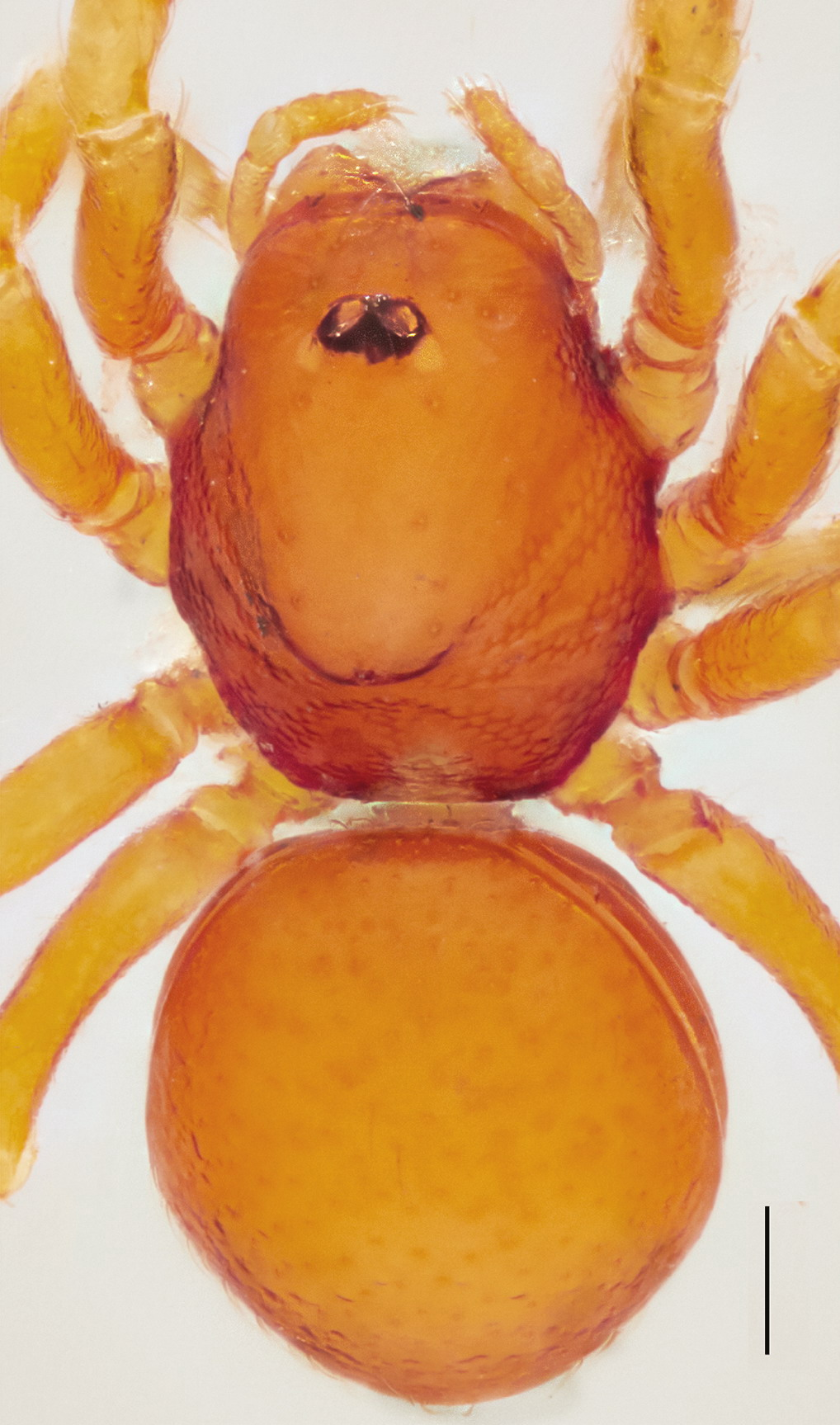
- A. contrita, female

Scientific classification
- Kingdom: Animalia
- Phylum: Arthropoda
- Subphylum: Chelicerata
- Class: Arachnida
- Order: Araneae
- Infraorder: Araneomorphae
- Family: Tetrablemmidae
- Genus: Ablemma; Roewer, 1963

Type species
- A. baso Roewer, 1963

Species
- 27, see text

= Ablemma =

Genus of spiders

Ablemma is a genus of araneomorph spiders in the family Tetrablemmidae that was first described by Carl Friedrich Roewer in 1963.

== Species ==
As of September 2019 it contains twenty-seven species and one subspecies, found in Asia, on the Solomon Islands, in Kiribati, and Papua New Guinea:

- Ablemma aiyura Shear, 1978 – New Guinea
- Ablemma andriana Fardiansah & Dupérré, 2019 – Indonesia (Sumatra)
- Ablemma baso Roewer, 1963 (type) – Indonesia (Sumatra)
- Ablemma berryi Shear, 1978 – Caroline Is.
- Ablemma circumspectans Deeleman-Reinhold, 1980 – Borneo
- Ablemma contrita Fardiansah & Dupérré, 2019 – Indonesia (Sumatra)
- Ablemma datahu Lehtinen, 1981 – Indonesia (Sulawesi)
- Ablemma erna Lehtinen, 1981 – Indonesia (Sumatra)
- Ablemma girinumu Lehtinen, 1981 – New Guinea
- Ablemma gombakense Wunderlich, 1995 – Malaysia
- Ablemma kaindi Lehtinen, 1981 – New Guinea
  - Ablemma k. avios Lehtinen, 1981 – New Guinea
- Ablemma kelinci Fardiansah & Dupérré, 2019 – Indonesia (Sumatra)
- Ablemma lempake Lehtinen, 1981 – Borneo
- Ablemma makiling Lehtinen, 1981 – Philippines
- Ablemma malacca Lin & Li, 2017 – Singapore
- Ablemma merotai Lehtinen, 1981 – Borneo
- Ablemma prominens Tong & Li, 2008 – China
- Ablemma pugnax (Brignoli, 1973) – New Guinea, Solomon Is.
- Ablemma rarosae Lehtinen, 1981 – Philippines
- Ablemma ruohomaekii Lehtinen, 1981 – Thailand
- Ablemma samarinda Lehtinen, 1981 – Borneo
- Ablemma sedgwicki Shear, 1978 – Borneo
- Ablemma shimojanai (Komatsu, 1968) – Japan (Ryukyu Is.)
- Ablemma singalang Lehtinen, 1981 – Indonesia (Sumatra)
- Ablemma sternofoveatum Lehtinen, 1981 – Borneo
- Ablemma syahdani Lehtinen, 1981 – Borneo
- Ablemma unicornis Burger, 2008 – Malaysia
