= Pahanga diyaluma =

Scientific classification
- Kingdom: Animalia
- Phylum: Arthropoda
- Subphylum: Chelicerata
- Class: Arachnida
- Order: Araneae
- Infraorder: Araneomorphae
- Family: Tetrablemmidae
- Genus: Pahanga
- Species: P. diyaluma

Binomial name
- Pahanga diyaluma Lehtinen, 1981

Species of spider

Pahanga diyaluma, is a species of spider of the genus Pahanga. It is endemic to Sri Lanka. It was first described from Diyaluma Falls area, hence the specific name.
