= Rhinoblemma =

Scientific classification
- Kingdom: Animalia
- Phylum: Arthropoda
- Subphylum: Chelicerata
- Class: Arachnida
- Order: Araneae
- Infraorder: Araneomorphae
- Family: Tetrablemmidae
- Genus: Rhinoblemma; Lehtinen, 1981
- Species: R. unicorne

Binomial name
- Rhinoblemma unicorne (Roewer, 1963)

Genus of spiders

Rhinoblemma is a monotypic genus of araneomorph spiders in the family Tetrablemmidae found on Caroline Island. It contains the single species, Rhinoblemma unicorne, first described in 1963 by Carl Friedrich Roewer under the name Tetrablemma unicornis. In 1981, Pekka T. Lehtinen transferred it to Rhinoblemma.

== See also ==
- Tetrablemma
