= Hexablemma =

Scientific classification
- Kingdom: Animalia
- Phylum: Arthropoda
- Subphylum: Chelicerata
- Class: Arachnida
- Order: Araneae
- Infraorder: Araneomorphae
- Family: Tetrablemmidae
- Genus: Hexablemma; Berland, 1920
- Species: H. cataphractum

Binomial name
- Hexablemma cataphractum Berland, 1920

Genus of spiders

Hexablemma is a monotypic genus of araneomorph spiders in the family Tetrablemmidae containing the single species, Hexablemma cataphractum. It was first described by Lucien Berland in 1920 from a female found in Kenya. It was separated from Tetrablemma in 1978 for this single species, because it does not belong there, but does not seem to belong anywhere else either.
