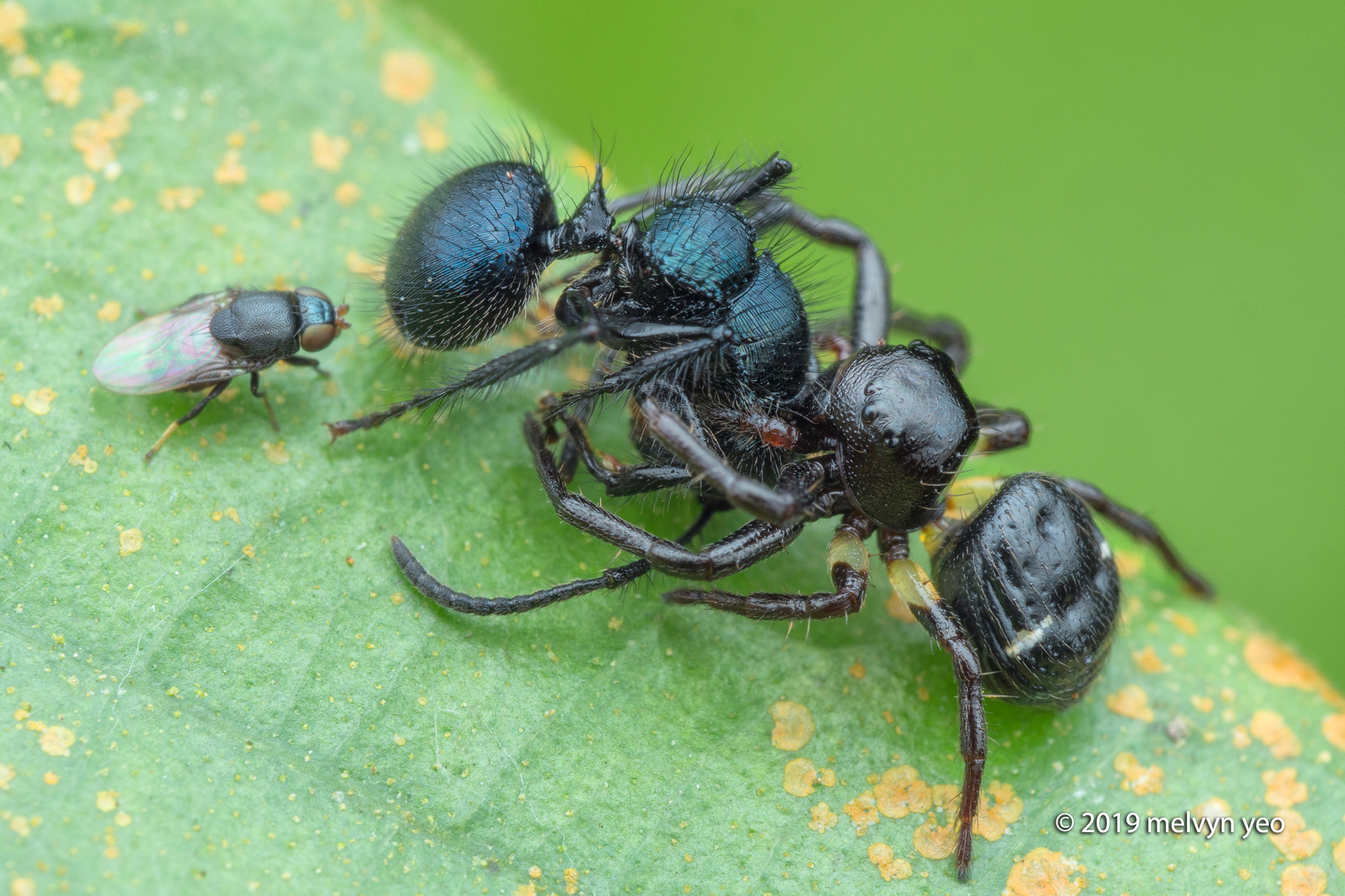
- N. bistriatus preying on ant

Scientific classification
- Kingdom: Animalia
- Phylum: Arthropoda
- Subphylum: Chelicerata
- Class: Arachnida
- Order: Araneae
- Infraorder: Araneomorphae
- Family: Thomisidae
- Genus: Nyctimus; Thorell, 1877

Type species
- N. bistriatus Thorell, 1877

Species
- Nyctimus bistriatus Thorell, 1877; Nyctimus trimeni (Simon, 1895)

Synonyms
- Zametopias

= Nyctimus (spider) =

Genus of spiders

Nyctimus is a genus of crab spiders first described by Tamerlan Thorell in 1877, ẃith two described species from South Africa and Indonesia.

== Life style ==
The life style of Nyctimus species remains unknown.

== Description ==
These are small spiders, known only from female specimens, which measure 4 mm in length. The cephalothorax is reddish-black in color and covered with small granules, while the mouthparts and sternum are smooth.

The abdomen is wider than it is long and has few scattered setae. The dorsal surface of the abdomen is dark with a median band, and the middle portion is decorated with white spots on both sides. The ventral surface is testaceous in color.

== Species ==
As of October 2025, this genus includes two species:

- Nyctimus bistriatus Thorell, 1877 – Indonesia (Sumatra, Sulawesi) (type species)
- Nyctimus trimeni (Simon, 1895) – South Africa
