= Fallablemma =

Scientific classification
- Kingdom: Animalia
- Phylum: Arthropoda
- Subphylum: Chelicerata
- Class: Arachnida
- Order: Araneae
- Infraorder: Araneomorphae
- Family: Tetrablemmidae
- Genus: Fallablemma; Shear, 1978

Type species
- F. castaneum (Marples, 1955)

Species
- F. castaneum (Marples, 1955) – Samoa; F. greenei Lehtinen, 1981 – Indonesia (Sulawesi)

Genus of spiders

Fallablemma is a genus of araneomorph spiders in the family Tetrablemmidae that was first described by W. A. Shear in 1978. As of September 2019 it contains two species, found on the Polynesian Islands and Sulawesi: F. castaneum and F. greenei.
