= Maijana =

Scientific classification
- Kingdom: Animalia
- Phylum: Arthropoda
- Subphylum: Chelicerata
- Class: Arachnida
- Order: Araneae
- Infraorder: Araneomorphae
- Family: Tetrablemmidae
- Genus: Maijana; Lehtinen, 1981
- Species: M. rackae

Binomial name
- Maijana rackae Lehtinen, 1981

Genus of spiders

Maijana is a monotypic genus of araneomorph spiders in the family Tetrablemmidae containing the single species, Maijana rackae. It was first described by Pekka T. Lehtinen in 1981 from a single female found in bat guano in a Javanese cave of the Bogor Regency. Though it looks similar to Tetrablemma species, the structural parts, namely the epigyne, are unique enough to differentiate them.

== See also ==
- Tetrablemma
