= Singalangia =

Scientific classification
- Kingdom: Animalia
- Phylum: Arthropoda
- Subphylum: Chelicerata
- Class: Arachnida
- Order: Araneae
- Infraorder: Araneomorphae
- Family: Tetrablemmidae
- Genus: Singalangia; Lehtinen, 1981
- Species: S. sternalis

Binomial name
- Singalangia sternalis Lehtinen, 1981

Genus of spiders

Singalangia is a monotypic genus of Sumatran araneomorph spiders in the family Tetrablemmidae containing the single species, Singalangia sternalis. It was first described by Pekka T. Lehtinen in 1981, and is found on Sumatra.
