= Choiroblemma =

Scientific classification
- Kingdom: Animalia
- Phylum: Arthropoda
- Subphylum: Chelicerata
- Class: Arachnida
- Order: Araneae
- Infraorder: Araneomorphae
- Family: Tetrablemmidae
- Genus: Choiroblemma; Bourne, 1980

Type species
- C. bengalense Bourne, 1980

Species
- C. bengalense Bourne, 1980 – India; C. rhinoxunum Bourne, 1980 – India

Genus of spiders

Choiroblemma is a genus of Indian araneomorph spiders in the family Tetrablemmidae that was first described by J. D. Bourne in 1980. As of September 2019 it contains two species, found in India: C. bengalense and C. rhinoxunum.
