= Afroblemma =

Scientific classification
- Kingdom: Animalia
- Phylum: Arthropoda
- Subphylum: Chelicerata
- Class: Arachnida
- Order: Araneae
- Infraorder: Araneomorphae
- Family: Tetrablemmidae
- Genus: Afroblemma; Lehtinen, 1981
- Species: A. thorelli

Binomial name
- Afroblemma thorelli (Brignoli, 1974)

Subspecies
- A. thorelli thorelli (Brignoli, 1974) – Angola, Tanzania; A. thorelli maniema Lehtinen, 1981 – Congo

Genus of spiders

Afroblemma is a monotypic genus of African araneomorph spiders in the family Tetrablemmidae containing the single species, Afroblemma thorelli. It was first described by Pekka T. Lehtinen in 1981, and is found in Africa.
