= Monoblemma =

Scientific classification
- Kingdom: Animalia
- Phylum: Arthropoda
- Subphylum: Chelicerata
- Class: Arachnida
- Order: Araneae
- Infraorder: Araneomorphae
- Family: Tetrablemmidae
- Genus: Monoblemma; Gertsch, 1941

Type species
- M. unicum Gertsch, 1941

Species
- 4, see text

Genus of spiders

Monoblemma is a genus of araneomorph spiders in the family Tetrablemmidae that was first described by Carl Eduard Adolph Gerstaecker in 1941.

== Species ==
As of September 2019 it contains four species, found in Brazil, Panama, on Madagascar, in Colombia, and on the Virgin Islands:

- Monoblemma becki Brignoli, 1978 – Brazil
- Monoblemma browni Shear, 1978 – Madagascar
- Monoblemma muchmorei Shear, 1978 – Virgin Is., Colombia
- Monoblemma unicum Gertsch, 1941 (type) – Panama
