= Sinamma =

Scientific classification
- Domain: Eukaryota
- Kingdom: Animalia
- Phylum: Arthropoda
- Subphylum: Chelicerata
- Class: Arachnida
- Order: Araneae
- Infraorder: Araneomorphae
- Family: Tetrablemmidae
- Genus: Sinamma; Lin & Li, 014

Species
- Sinamma oxycera Lin & Li, 2014

Genus of spiders

Sinamma is a genus of spiders in the family Tetrablemmidae. It was first described in 2014 by Lin & Li. As of January 2017, it contains only one Chinese species, Sinamma oxycera.
