= Anansia =

Scientific classification
- Kingdom: Animalia
- Phylum: Arthropoda
- Subphylum: Chelicerata
- Class: Arachnida
- Order: Araneae
- Infraorder: Araneomorphae
- Family: Tetrablemmidae
- Genus: Anansia; Lehtinen, 1981
- Species: A. astaroth

Binomial name
- Anansia astaroth (Brignoli, 1974)

Genus of spiders

Anansia is a monotypic genus of Angolan araneomorph spiders in the family Tetrablemmidae containing the single species, Anansia astaroth. It was first described by Pekka T. Lehtinen in 1981, and is found in Angola.
