= Mariblemma =

Scientific classification
- Kingdom: Animalia
- Phylum: Arthropoda
- Subphylum: Chelicerata
- Class: Arachnida
- Order: Araneae
- Infraorder: Araneomorphae
- Family: Tetrablemmidae
- Genus: Mariblemma; Lehtinen, 1981
- Species: M. pandani

Binomial name
- Mariblemma pandani (Brignoli, 1978)

Genus of spiders

Mariblemma is a monotypic genus of araneomorph spiders in the family Tetrablemmidae found on the Seychelles. It contains the single species, Mariblemma pandani, first described by Paolo Brignoli in 1978 and placed into Paculla. Pekka T. Lehtinen transferred it to Mariblemma in 1981, disagreeing with Brignoli's original placement.
