= Cuangoblemma =

Scientific classification
- Kingdom: Animalia
- Phylum: Arthropoda
- Subphylum: Chelicerata
- Class: Arachnida
- Order: Araneae
- Infraorder: Araneomorphae
- Family: Tetrablemmidae
- Genus: Cuangoblemma; Brignoli, 1974
- Species: C. machadoi

Binomial name
- Cuangoblemma machadoi Brignoli, 1974

Genus of spiders

Cuangoblemma is a monotypic genus of Angolan araneomorph spiders in the family Tetrablemmidae containing the single species, Cuangoblemma machadoi. It was first described by Paolo Marcello Brignoli in 1974, and is found in Angola.
