= Gunasekera =

- Gender: Unisex
- Language: Sinhala

Other names
- Variant forms: Goonasekera; Gunasekara; Gunesekera

Gunasekera or Gunasekara is a Sinhalese surname. Notable people with the surname include:

== People ==
- Abraham Mendis Gunasekera (1869–1931), Ceylonese writer
- Basil Gunasekara (born 1929), Sri Lankan navy officer
- C. I. Gunasekera (1920–2010), Sri Lankan cricketer
- Churchill Gunasekara (1894–1969), Ceylonese cricketer
- D. E. W. Gunasekera (born 1935), Sri Lankan politician
- Deepal Gunasekara, Sri Lankan politician
- Earl Gunasekara (born 1960), Sri Lankan politician
- Edward Gunasekara, Sri Lankan politician
- Frank Gunasekera, Ceylonese politician
- H. M. Gunasekera, Sri Lankan broadcaster
- Hemal Gunasekara (born 1959), Sri Lankan politician
- Kapila Gunasekara, Sri Lankan academic
- Maiya Gunasekara, Sri Lankan physician and rugby player
- Mandy Gunasekara, American Environmental Attorney and author
- Pasan Gunasekera (1964–1995), Sri Lankan soldier
- R. M. Padma Udhaya Shantha Gunasekera, Sri Lankan politician
- Romesh Gunesekera (born 1954), British author
- Ruvindu Gunasekera (born 1991), Sri Lankan cricketer
- Tudor Gunasekara (1935–2021), Sri Lankan politician and diplomat
- U. N. Gunasekera, Sri Lankan civil engineer
- Valentine Gunasekara (1931–2017), Sri Lankan architect
- Victor Gunasekara (1921–1993), Ceylonese civil servant
- Yohan Goonasekera (born 1957), Sri Lankan cricketer

== Other uses ==
- Gunasekara - a spider genus with single species endemic to Sri Lanka.
