= Synaphosus =

Scientific classification
- Kingdom: Animalia
- Phylum: Arthropoda
- Subphylum: Chelicerata
- Class: Arachnida
- Order: Araneae
- Infraorder: Araneomorphae
- Family: Gnaphosidae
- Genus: Synaphosus; Platnick & Shadab, 1980

Type species
- S. syntheticus (Chamberlin, 1924)

Species
- 32, see text

Genus of spiders

Synaphosus is a genus of ground spiders that was first described by Norman I. Platnick & M. U. Shadab in 1980.

== Species ==
As of May 2019 it contains thirty-two species:

- Synaphosus cangshanus Yang, Yang & Zhang, 2013 – China
- Synaphosus daweiensis Yin, Bao & Peng, 2002 – China
- Synaphosus dubius Marusik & Omelko, 2018 – Thailand
- Synaphosus evertsi Ovtsharenko, Levy & Platnick, 1994 – Ivory Coast, Indonesia (Bali), Philippines
- Synaphosus femininis Deeleman-Reinhold, 2001 – China, Laos, Indonesia (Java)
- Synaphosus gracillimus (O. Pickard-Cambridge, 1872) – Egypt, Israel
- Synaphosus intricatus (Denis, 1947) – Algeria, Egypt
- Synaphosus iunctus Sankaran & Sebastian, 2018 – India
- Synaphosus jaegeri Marusik & Omelko, 2018 – Laos
- Synaphosus kakamega Ovtsharenko, Levy & Platnick, 1994 – Kenya
- Synaphosus karakumensis Ovtsharenko, Levy & Platnick, 1994 – Turkmenistan
- Synaphosus khashm Ovtsharenko, Levy & Platnick, 1994 – Saudi Arabia
- Synaphosus lehtineni Marusik & Omelko, 2018 – Indonesia (Sulawesi)
- Synaphosus makhambetensis Ponomarev, 2008 – Kazakhstan
- Synaphosus minimus (Caporiacco, 1936) – Libya, Egypt
- Synaphosus mongolicus Marusik & Fomichev, 2016 – Mongolia
- Synaphosus nanus (O. Pickard-Cambridge, 1872) – Israel
- Synaphosus neali Ovtsharenko, Levy & Platnick, 1994 – Iran, Pakistan
- Synaphosus ovtsharenkoi Marusik & Fomichev, 2016 – Mongolia
- Synaphosus palearcticus Ovtsharenko, Levy & Platnick, 1994 – Greece, Turkey to Central Asia
- Synaphosus paludis (Chamberlin & Gertsch, 1940) – USA
- Synaphosus raveni Deeleman-Reinhold, 2001 – Thailand
- Synaphosus saidovi Marusik & Fomichev, 2016 – Tajikistan
- Synaphosus sauvage Ovtsharenko, Levy & Platnick, 1994 – Spain, France, Switzerland, Italy
- Synaphosus shirin Ovtsharenko, Levy & Platnick, 1994 – Cyprus, Iran
- Synaphosus shmakovi Marusik & Fomichev, 2016 – Mongolia
- Synaphosus soyunovi Ovtsharenko, Levy & Platnick, 1994 – Turkmenistan
- Synaphosus syntheticus (Chamberlin, 1924) (type) – Libya, Egypt, Israel, Saudi Arabia. Introduced to USA, Mexico
- Synaphosus taukum Ovtsharenko, Levy & Platnick, 1994 – Kazakhstan
- Synaphosus trichopus (Roewer, 1928) – Greece, Crete
- Synaphosus turanicus Ovtsharenko, Levy & Platnick, 1994 – Central Asia
- Synaphosus yatenga Ovtsharenko, Levy & Platnick, 1994 – Burkina Faso
