= Lehtinenia =

Scientific classification
- Kingdom: Animalia
- Phylum: Arthropoda
- Subphylum: Chelicerata
- Class: Arachnida
- Order: Araneae
- Infraorder: Araneomorphae
- Family: Tetrablemmidae
- Genus: Lehtinenia; Tong & Li, 2008

Type species
- L. bicornis Tong & Li, 2008

Species
- L. arcus Lin & Li, 2010 – China; L. bicornis Tong & Li, 2008 – China; L. bisulcus Lin, Pham & Li, 2009 – Vietnam

Genus of spiders

Lehtinenia is a genus of Asian araneomorph spiders in the family Tetrablemmidae that was first described by Y. F. Tong & S. Q. Li in 2008. As of September 2019 it contains three species, found in Asia: L. arcus, L. bicornis, and L. bisulcus. It is named in honor of Pekka T. Lehtinen.

== See also ==
- Pekka T. Lehtinen
