= Bacillemma =

Scientific classification
- Kingdom: Animalia
- Phylum: Arthropoda
- Subphylum: Chelicerata
- Class: Arachnida
- Order: Araneae
- Infraorder: Araneomorphae
- Family: Tetrablemmidae
- Genus: Bacillemma; Deeleman-Reinhold, 1993
- Species: B. leclerci

Binomial name
- Bacillemma leclerci Deeleman-Reinhold, 1993

Genus of spiders

Bacillemma is a monotypic genus of Thai araneomorph spiders in the family Tetrablemmidae containing the single species, Bacillemma leclerci. It was first described by Christa Laetitia Deeleman-Reinhold in 1993, and is found in Thailand.
