= Indophantes =

Scientific classification
- Kingdom: Animalia
- Phylum: Arthropoda
- Subphylum: Chelicerata
- Class: Arachnida
- Order: Araneae
- Infraorder: Araneomorphae
- Family: Linyphiidae
- Genus: Indophantes; Saaristo & Tanasevitch, 2003

Type species
- I. kalimantanus Saaristo & Tanasevitch, 2003

Species
- 12, see text

Genus of spiders

Indophantes is a genus of Asian dwarf spiders that was first described by Michael I. Saaristo & A. V. Tanasevitch in 2003.

== Species ==
As of May 2019 it contains twelve species, found in China, India, Indonesia, Nepal, and Pakistan:

- Indophantes agamus Tanasevitch & Saaristo, 2006 – Nepal
- Indophantes barat Saaristo & Tanasevitch, 2003 – Indonesia (Sumatra)
- Indophantes bengalensis Saaristo & Tanasevitch, 2003 – India
- Indophantes digitulus (Thaler, 1987) – India, Nepal, Pakistan
- Indophantes halonatus (Li & Zhu, 1995) – China
- Indophantes kalimantanus Saaristo & Tanasevitch, 2003 (type) – Borneo
- Indophantes kinabalu Saaristo & Tanasevitch, 2003 – Borneo
- Indophantes lehtineni Saaristo & Tanasevitch, 2003 – Borneo
- Indophantes pallidus Saaristo & Tanasevitch, 2003 – India
- Indophantes ramosus Tanasevitch, 2006 – China
- Indophantes sumatera Saaristo & Tanasevitch, 2003 – Indonesia (Sumatra)
- Indophantes tonglu Tanasevitch, 2011 – India
