= Matta (spider) =

Scientific classification
- Kingdom: Animalia
- Phylum: Arthropoda
- Subphylum: Chelicerata
- Class: Arachnida
- Order: Araneae
- Infraorder: Araneomorphae
- Family: Tetrablemmidae
- Genus: Matta; Crosby, 1934

Type species
- M. hambletoni Crosby, 1934

Species
- 10, see text

Genus of spiders

Matta is a genus of araneomorph spiders in the family Tetrablemmidae that was first described by C. R. Crosby in 1934.

== Species ==
As of September 2019 it contains ten species, found in Mexico and Brazil:

- Matta angelomachadoi Brescovit, 2005 – Brazil
- Matta cambito Brescovit & Cizauskas, 2019 – Brazil
- Matta hambletoni Crosby, 1934 (type) – Brazil
- Matta humhum Brescovit & Cizauskas, 2019 – Brazil
- Matta humrrum Brescovit & Cizauskas, 2019 – Brazil
- Matta mckenziei Shear, 1978 – Mexico
- Matta nuusga Brescovit & Cizauskas, 2019 – Brazil
- Matta pititinha Brescovit & Cizauskas, 2019 – Brazil
- Matta teteia Brescovit & Cizauskas, 2019 – Brazil
- Matta zuiuda Brescovit & Cizauskas, 2019 – Brazil
