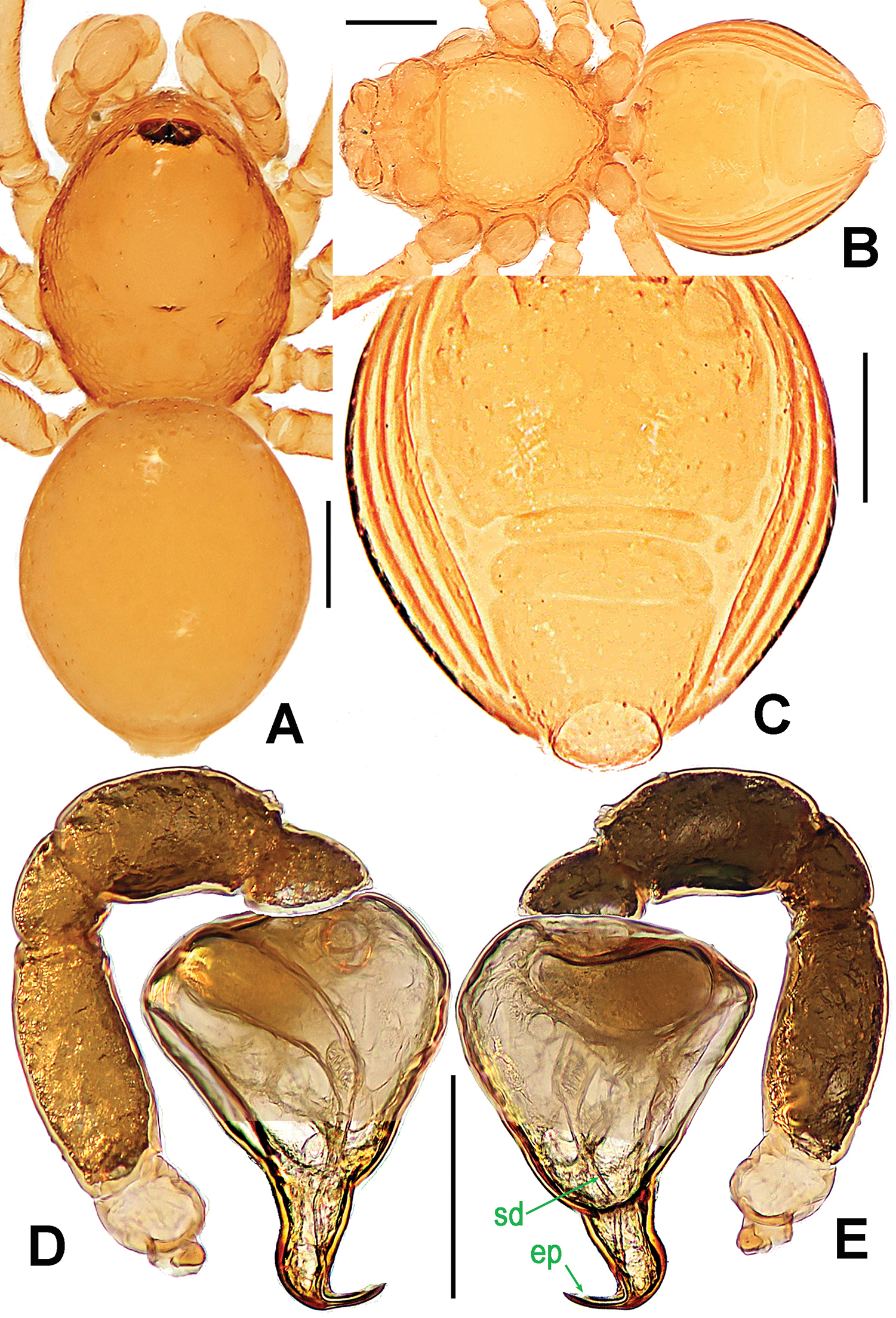
- Sulaimania vigelandi

Scientific classification
- Kingdom: Animalia
- Phylum: Arthropoda
- Subphylum: Chelicerata
- Class: Arachnida
- Order: Araneae
- Infraorder: Araneomorphae
- Family: Tetrablemmidae
- Genus: Sulaimania; Lehtinen, 1981

Type species
- S. vigelandi Lehtinen, 1981

Species
- S. brevis Lin & Li, 2017 – Singapore; S. vigelandi Lehtinen, 1981 – Malaysia

= Sulaimania (spider) =

Genus of spiders

Sulaimania is a genus of Southeast Asian araneomorph spiders in the family Tetrablemmidae that was first described by Pekka T. Lehtinen in 1981. As of September 2019 it contains two species, found in Malaysia and Singapore: S. brevis and S. vigelandi.
