= Caraimatta =

Scientific classification
- Kingdom: Animalia
- Phylum: Arthropoda
- Subphylum: Chelicerata
- Class: Arachnida
- Order: Araneae
- Infraorder: Araneomorphae
- Family: Tetrablemmidae
- Genus: Caraimatta; Lehtinen, 1981

Type species
- C. sbordonii (Brignoli, 1972)

Species
- 4, see text

Genus of spiders

Caraimatta is a genus of araneomorph spiders in the family Tetrablemmidae that was first described by Pekka T. Lehtinen in 1981.

== Species ==
As of September 2019 it contains four species, found in Central America, Jamaica, Cuba, Colombia, and Mexico:

- Caraimatta blandini Lehtinen, 1981 – Mexico
- Caraimatta brescoviti García, Martínez & Ahumada-C., 2019 – Colombia
- Caraimatta cambridgei (Bryant, 1940) – Cuba, Jamaica, Mexico to Panama
- Caraimatta sbordonii (Brignoli, 1972) (type) – Mexico, Guatemala
