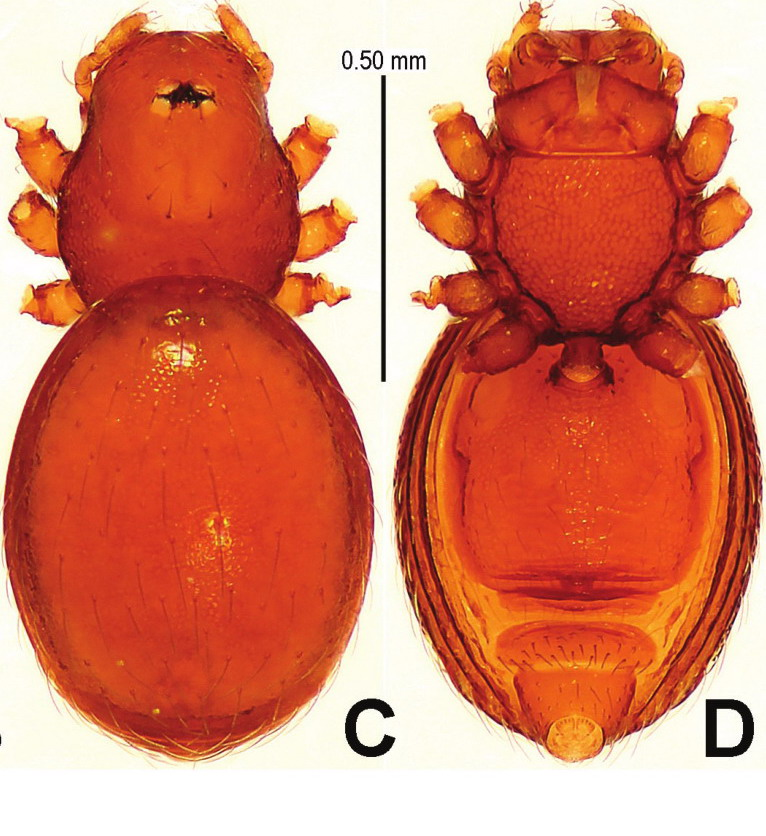
- Tetrablemma ziyaoensis, female

Scientific classification
- Kingdom: Animalia
- Phylum: Arthropoda
- Subphylum: Chelicerata
- Class: Arachnida
- Order: Araneae
- Infraorder: Araneomorphae
- Family: Tetrablemmidae; O. Pickard-Cambridge, 1873

Diversity
- 27 genera, 153 species
- blue: reported countries (WSC)

= Tetrablemmidae =

Tetrablemmidae Temporal range: Cenomanian–present

Family of spiders

Tetrablemmidae, sometimes called armored spiders, is a family of tropical araneomorph spiders first described by Octavius Pickard-Cambridge in 1873. It contains around 150 described species in 27 genera from southeast Asia, with a few that occur in Africa and Central and South America.

Pacullidae was incorporated into this family in 1981, but was later restored as a separate family in a 2016 phylogenetic study.

Most species have been collected from litter and soil, including that of epiphytes. Some live in caves and show typical adaptations of cave spiders, such as loss of eyes and weak sclerotization. Members of Tetrablemma only have four eyes, a trait in spiders only found in these and certain members of Caponiidae.

== Genera ==
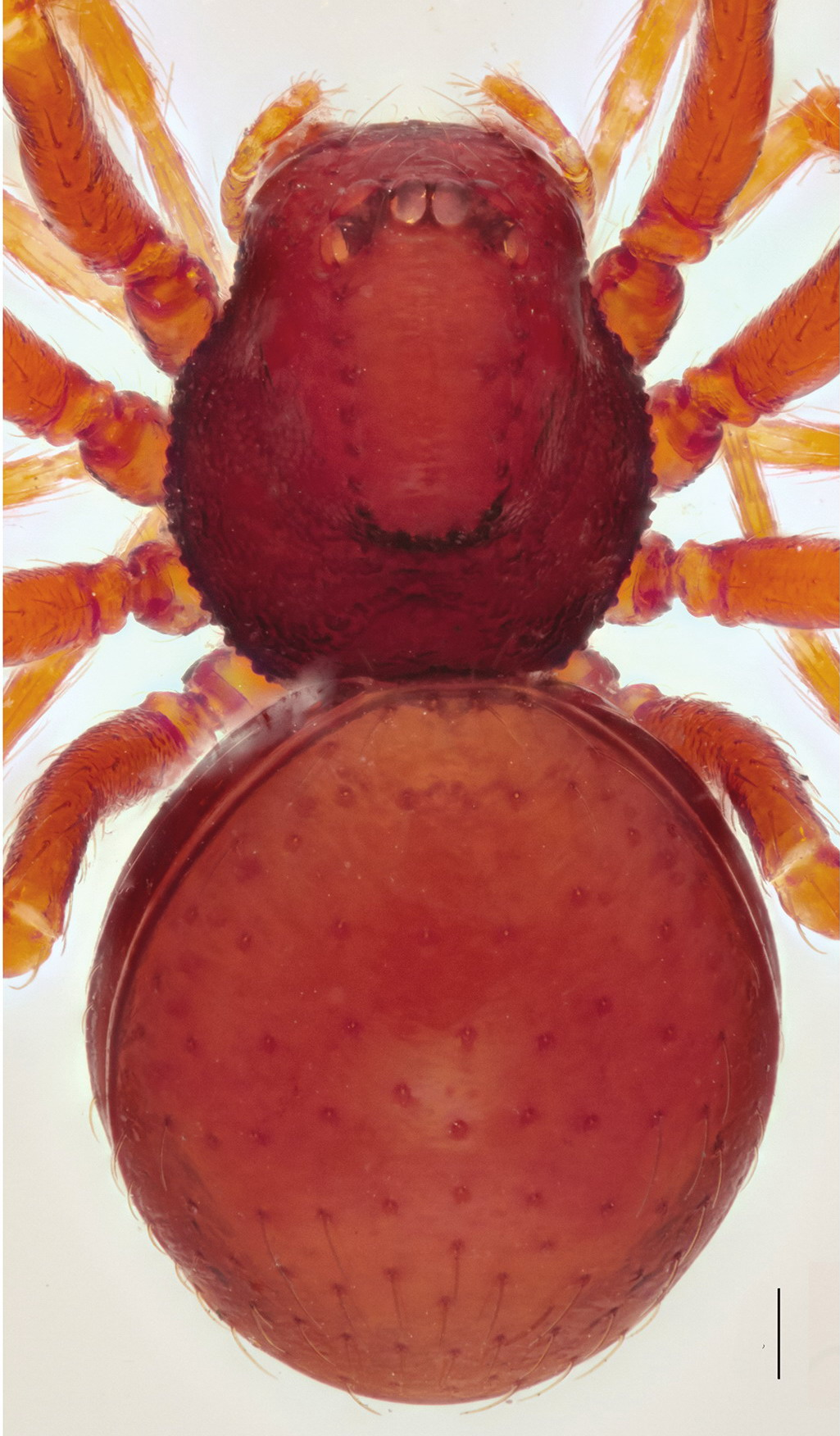
Brignoliella patmae

As of January 2026, this family includes 27 genera and 153 species:

- Ablemma Roewer, 1963 – Asia, Papua New Guinea, Solomon Islands, Caroline Islands
- Afroblemma Lehtinen, 1981 – Angola, DR Congo, Tanzania
- Anansia Lehtinen, 1981 – Angola
- Bacillemma Deeleman-Reinhold, 1993 – Thailand
- Borneomma Deeleman-Reinhold, 1980 – Indonesia, Malaysia
- Brignoliella Shear, 1978 – Asia, Fiji, New Caledonia, Papua New Guinea, Caroline Islands
- Caraimatta Lehtinen, 1981 – Guatemala, Mexico, Colombia
- Choiroblemma Bourne, 1980 – China, India
- Cuangoblemma Brignoli, 1974 – Angola
- Fallablemma Shear, 1978 – Indonesia, Samoa
- Gunasekara Lehtinen, 1981 – Sri Lanka
- Hexablemma Berland, 1920 – Kenya
- Indicoblemma Bourne, 1980 – China, Thailand, India
- Lehtinenia Tong & Li, 2008 – China, Vietnam
- Maijana Lehtinen, 1981 – Indonesia
- Mariblemma Lehtinen, 1981 – Seychelles
- Matta Crosby, 1934 – Mexico, Brazil
- Micromatta Lehtinen, 1981 – Belize
- Monoblemma Gertsch, 1941 – Cuba, Puerto Rico, Virgin Islands, Panama, Brazil, Colombia
- Pahanga Shear, 1979 – Indonesia, Malaysia, Sri Lanka
- Rhinoblemma Lehtinen, 1981 – Caroline Islands
- Shearella Lehtinen, 1981 – Madagascar, China, India, Sri Lanka
- Sinamma Lin & Li, 2014 – China
- Singalangia Lehtinen, 1981 – Indonesia
- Singaporemma Shear, 1978 – China, Singapore, Thailand, Vietnam
- Sulaimania Lehtinen, 1981 – Malaysia, Singapore
- Tetrablemma O. Pickard-Cambridge, 1873 – Angola, Seychelles, St. Helena, Asia, Trinidad, Australia, Samoa, Colombia, Venezuela

=== Extinct genera ===
- †Balticoblemma Wunderlich 2004 Bitterfeld, Baltic amber, Eocene
- †Bicornoculus Wunderlich 2015 Burmese amber, Myanmar, Cenomanian
- †Brignoliblemma Wunderlich 2017 Burmese amber, Myanmar, Cenomanian
- †Cymbioblemma Wunderlich 2017 Burmese amber, Myanmar, Cenomanian
- †Electroblemma Selden et al. 2016 Burmese amber, Myanmar, Cenomanian
- †Eogamasomorpha Wunderlich 2008 Burmese amber, Myanmar, Cenomanian
- †Longissithorax Wunderlich 2017 Burmese amber, Myanmar, Cenomanian
- †Longithorax Wunderlich 2017 Burmese amber, Myanmar, Cenomanian
- †Palpalpaculla Wunderlich 2017 Burmese amber, Myanmar, Cenomanian
- †Saetosoma Wunderlich 2012 Burmese amber, Myanmar, Cenomanian
- †Uniscutosoma Wunderlich 2015 Burmese amber, Myanmar, Cenomanian
