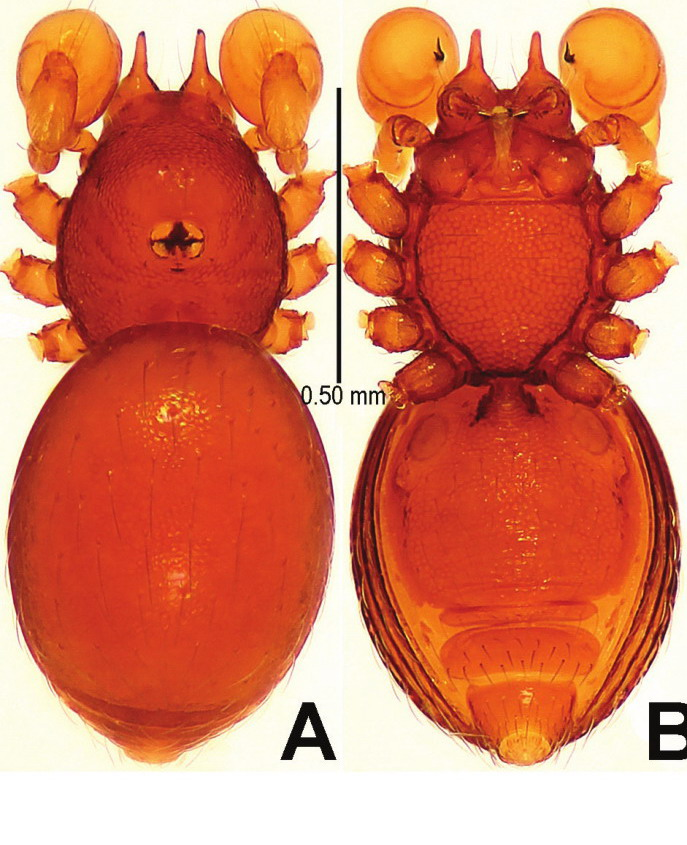
- T. ziyaoensis, male

Scientific classification
- Kingdom: Animalia
- Phylum: Arthropoda
- Subphylum: Chelicerata
- Class: Arachnida
- Order: Araneae
- Infraorder: Araneomorphae
- Family: Tetrablemmidae
- Genus: Tetrablemma; O. Pickard-Cambridge, 1873

Species
- See text

Synonyms
- Indonops

= Tetrablemma =

Genus of spiders

Tetrablemma is a widespread genus of armored spiders first described by Octavius Pickard-Cambridge in 1873. It contains 30 species found in tropical and subtropical regions primarily throughout Asia and Oceania, with one species, Tetrablemma rhinoceros, known from Angola. They are found in leaf litter, soil, and caves.

The genus contains some of the only species of spiders to have just four eyes along with some species of Caponiidae, to which they are not closely related. The eyes are large and unequal in size, closely grouped around the center of the cephalothorax, with the eye group tending to be set further back in males. The genus contains some variation in eye arrangement, as Tetrablemma alaus, a subterranean species, lacks eyes or any eye spots entirely. They have four closely positioned spinnerets enclosed in a corneous casing.

Lehtinen divided the genus into three subgenera in 1981: Kumaonia, Indonops, and Tetrablemma, although this subgeneric arrangement is not always followed by subsequent authors.

== Species ==
As of November 2024, the World Spider Catalog accepted the following species:

- Tetrablemma alaus Burger, Harvey & Stevens, 2010 – Australia (Western Australia)
- Tetrablemma alterum Roewer, 1963 – Micronesia
- Tetrablemma benoiti (Brignoli, 1978) – Seychelles
- Tetrablemma brevidens Tong & Li, 2008 – China
- Tetrablemma brignolii Lehtinen, 1981 – India
- Tetrablemma deccanense (Tikader, 1976) – India
- Tetrablemma extorre Shear, 1978 – Trinidad
- Tetrablemma gongshan Lin, 2021 – China
- Tetrablemma helenense Benoit, 1977 – St. Helena
- Tetrablemma kepense Lin, Li & Jäger, 2018 – Cambodia
- Tetrablemma loebli Bourne, 1980 – India
- Tetrablemma magister Burger, 2008 – Australia (Queensland)
- Tetrablemma manggarai Lehtinen, 1981 – Indonesia (Flores)
- Tetrablemma marawula Lehtinen, 1981 – Indonesia (Sulawesi)
- Tetrablemma mardionoi Lehtinen, 1981 – Indonesia (Sumatra)
- Tetrablemma medioculatum O. Pickard-Cambridge, 1873 (type species) – Sri Lanka
- Tetrablemma menglaense Lin & Li, 2014 – China
- Tetrablemma mochima Martínez, Flórez-Daza & Brescovit, 2020 – Venezuela
- Tetrablemma namkhan Lin, Li & Jäger, 2012 – Laos
- Tetrablemma nandan Lin & Li, 2010 – China
- Tetrablemma okei Butler, 1932 – Australia (Victoria)
- Tetrablemma phulchoki Lehtinen, 1981 – Nepal
- Tetrablemma rhinoceros (Brignoli, 1974) – Angola
- Tetrablemma samoense Marples, 1964 – Samoa
- Tetrablemma sokense Lin, Li & Jäger, 2018 – Cambodia
- Tetrablemma tatacoa Martínez, Flórez-Daza & Brescovit, 2020 – Colombia
- Tetrablemma thamin Labarque & Grismado, 2009 – Myanmar
- Tetrablemma viduum (Brignoli, 1974) – Angola
- Tetrablemma vietnamense Lehtinen, 1981 – Vietnam
- Tetrablemma ziyaoense Lin & Li, 2014 – China
