= Pekka T. Lehtinen =

Finnish arachnologist (born 1934)

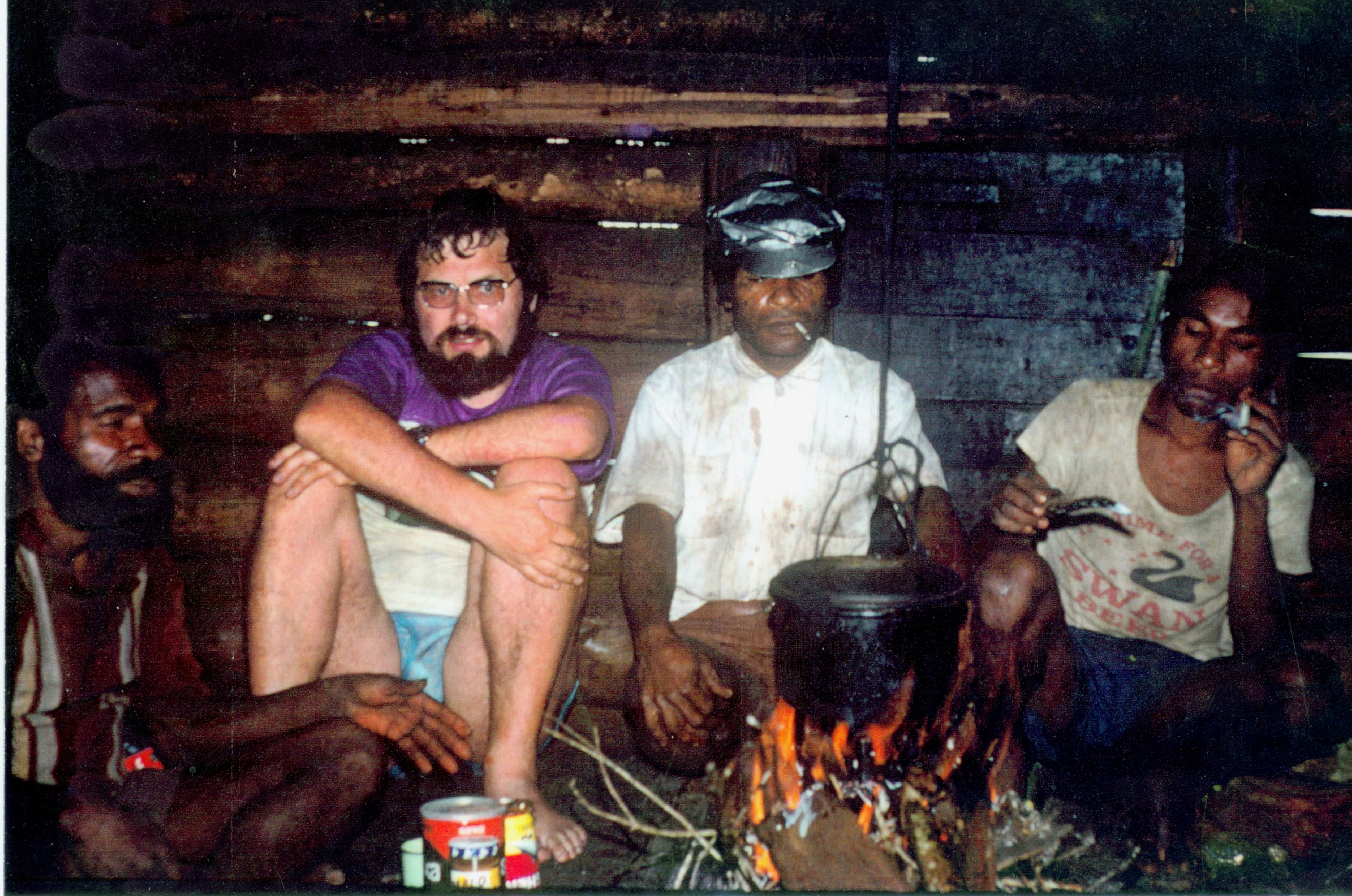
- Lehtinen (second from left) in Papua New Guinea
- Born: 5 April 1934 (age 92); Pargas, Finland
- Scientific career
- Fields: Arachnology
- Workplaces: University of Turku

Pekka T. Lehtinen (born 1934) is a Finnish arachnologist and taxonomist. He is known for his works in systematics and for the many expeditions in which he has participated.

== Biography ==
Lehtinen was born on 5 April 1934 in a small village, Pargas, in the archipelago of southwestern Finland. He graduated from a senior high school in Turku in 1952. In the same year he entered the University of Turku and was awarded an MSc degree in February 1955, two and a half years later.

After graduating he served in the military for one year, and was trained in the reserve officers' school, where he was given the rank of Second Lieutenant. He worked as an assistant lecturer in the Department of Zoology and in the Faculty of Medicine (preclinical courses) of the University of Turku from 1956 to 1967. After working for several years with a different theme for his PhD thesis, in 1967 Lehtinen published "Classification of the Cribellate spiders and some allied families, with notes on the evolution of the suborder Araneomorphae" and defended his submission for the degree of PhD in September. In January 1968 he was nominated as the Head Curator at the Zoological Museum of the University of Turku, where he stayed until his retirement in 1999. In 1968 he obtained the position of Docent of Zoology at the universities of Turku and Helsinki. He taught mainly in Helsinki, as there was no funding for separately budgeted advanced teaching in Turku.

== Scientific activities ==
The activity of Pekka Lehtinen has been dealt with briefly by Koponen [2011] and Marusik [2011], and more comprehensively by Marusik [2004, in Russian]. Pekka Lehtinen started his career as a malacologist; his MSc thesis dealt with terrestrial gastropods in the Finnish archipelago. In addition to gastropods, he also actively studied millipedes, centipedes, and terrestrial isopods of the SW-archipelago and worked for many years on a planned doctoral thesis concerning the colonization of this unique archipelago by terrestrial invertebrates.

He collected his first arachnological samples in 1957, and in 1962 Lehtinen published his first (faunistic) paper on spiders. Subsequently, he changed the theme of his PhD to the taxonomy of spiders, because he soon realized that there were a lot of unsolved large-scale problems. From the time Lehtinen started to work on his PhD thesis up until the present, he has visited almost all the leading museums in the world (he visited the MNHN in Paris 11 times) and/or loaned types and comparative material in order to study poorly available faunas collected from remote islands and territories.

To date he has visited over 60 museums. After gaining a permanent position at the University of Turku, Lehtinen started to carry out extensive expeditions world-wide, a practice which he has continued to the present. Since 1969 he has visited over 70 countries in search for spiders, mites, harvestmen, pseudoscorpions, terrestrial isopods, myriapods, molluscs and other invertebrates.

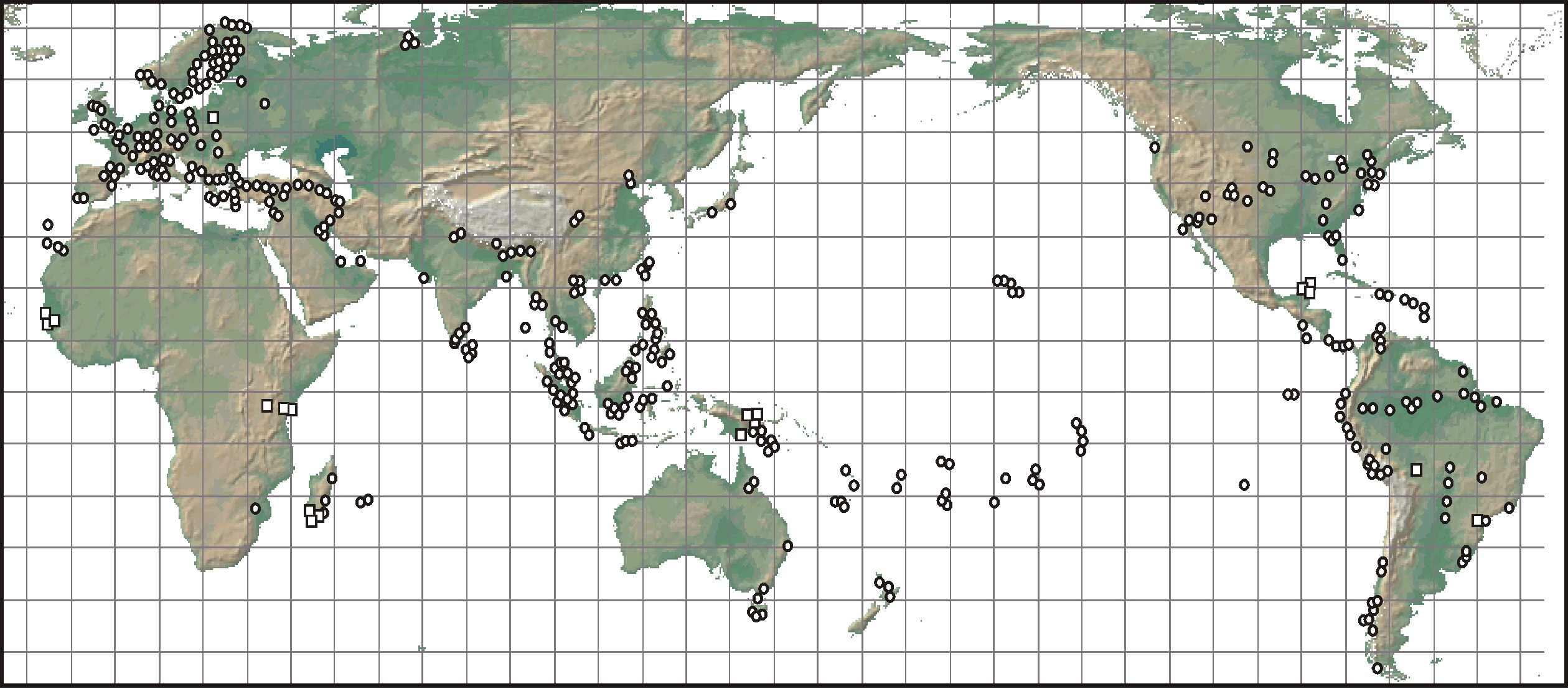
Excursions of Pekka T. Lehtinen

Some of the countries he visited four or even more times, such as India, Philippines, Sri Lanka, Thailand, Malaysia, Indonesia and French Polynesia. His first expedition to the Tropics was to Sri Lanka (1969) and his most recent expeditions were to Gambia-Senegal (2011), Kenya-Mauritius (2012) and Tahiti-Moorea (2013).

Most of the expeditions and congress trips have been done without any funding from his home country, mostly supported from his own pension. All materials collected during these expeditions (spiders and other invertebrates) were sorted and properly labelled by himself. All spiders were sorted to families, and most of them to genera. It seems that nobody in the history of arachnological studies can be compared with Lehtinen in respect to the number of expeditions, and their geography. Some arachnologists call Lehtinen an "illustrious Eugène Simon" (referring to the fact that Simon also traveled a lot, surveyed all spider families, although published rather few figures).

Pekka Lehtinen has participated in all international congresses of arachnology: the pre-CIDA Congress in Frankfurt am Main (1965), and then in Paris (1968), Brno (1971), Amsterdam (1974), Exeter, UK (1977, as an invited speaker), Vienna (1980), Panama (1983), Jaca, Spain (1986), Turku (1989), Brisbane (1992), Geneva (1995), Chicago (1998), Badplaas, South Africa (2001, as an invited speaker), Ghent, Belgium (2003), Saõ Pedro, Brazil (2007), Siedlce, Poland (2010) and Kenting, Taiwan (2013). He acted as the chairman of the Organizing Committee of the Turku Congress, 1989, and was one of the editors of its Proceedings. He has also attended two European Colloquia (Aarhus and St. Petersburg).

In 2001 during the ISA congress held in South Africa, he was elected as an Honorary Member of the International Society of Arachnology. In 2007 at another congress, Lehtinen was again elected as an Honorary Member. Currently he is only arachnologist who is a ‘twofold’ Honorary Member of the ISA. Since 1965, Lehtinen represented Finland in CIDA (Centre International de Documentation Arachnologique), until this organization was transformed to the ISA (International Society of Arachnology) in 1998.

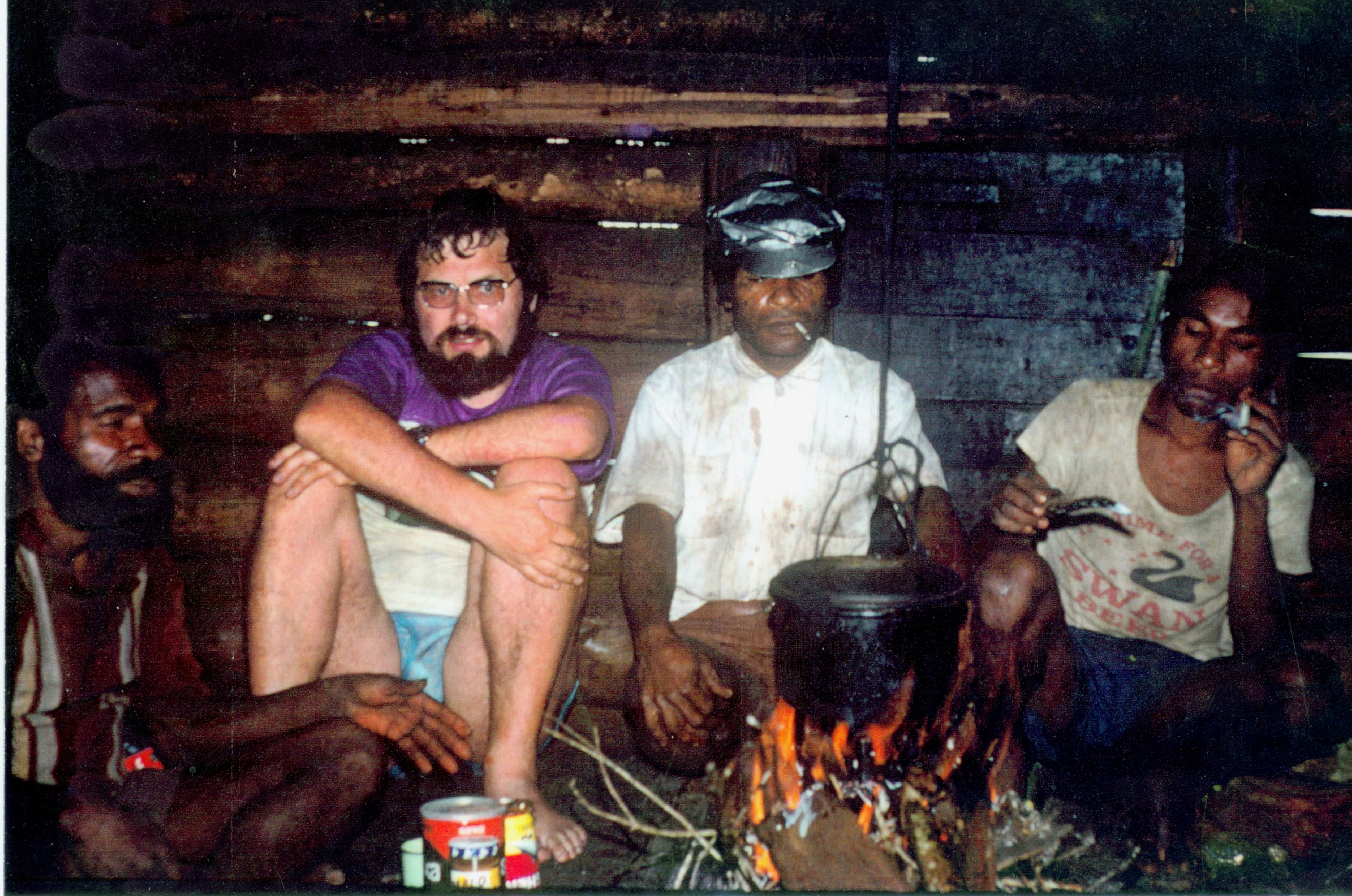
Pekka Lehtinen in Papua New Guinea

Lehtinen has always been active in nature conservation projects, both in field studies and (from 1983) as a member of different committees and working groups, for example, in compiling the Finnish Red Data Books. Ministers of the Environment in French Polynesia, the Cook Islands and Mauritius have also consulted him in matters of nature conservation. Part of his acarological studies have concerned national projects in medical acarology (mite allergy 1987-90 – the only totally funded project during his whole carrier) and borreliosis 1991–2009.

Lehtinen is well known not only amongst arachnologists, but also amongst the wider zoological community. Since August 1980 up until the Congress in Athens 2000 he was a member of the ICZN (International Commission on Zoological Nomenclature). In 1990 he became a council member and participated in preparing of the new Code. While working for the ICZN Committee he attended the following meetings: Ottawa 1982, Budapest 1985, Canberra 1988, Washington 1990 (special meeting for adoption of the new Code), Amsterdam 1991, Paris 1994, Taipei 1998 and Athens 2000. Lehtinen was active on the world forum several times, for example, as a member of the Organizing Committee of the ICSEB (International Congress of Systematic and Evolutionary Biology) held in 1990 in Washington, D.C., and in 1996 in Budapest, when he served as a member of the IOSEB Council (International Organization for Systematic and Evolutionary Biology). He has discovered the following spider and mite taxa:

Afroblemma	Anansia	Andoharano	Astavakra	Caraimatta
Carpathonesticus	Daramulunia	Gandanameno	Gunasekara	Kukulcania
Lamania	Maijana	Mariblemma	Micromatta	Neothyridae
Nesticella	Polenecia	Pritha	Purumitra	Rhinoblemma
Shearella	Singalangia	Sulaimania	Tangaroa
Wajane	Zaitunia

== Legacy ==
There are 28 taxa named in his honor:

- Lehtinenia Tong & Li, 2008
- Lehtineniana Sherwood, 2022
- Ajmonia lehtineni Marusik & Koponen, 1998
- Andoharano lehtineni Magalhaes & Grismado, 2019
- Atmetochilus lehtineni Zonstein & Marusik, 2016
- Colopea lehtineni Zheng, Marusik & Li, 2009
- Colyttus lehtineni Żabka, 1985
- Devade lehtineni Esyunin & Efimik, 2000
- Eupoa lehtineni Logunov & Marusik, 2014
- Filistata lehtineni Marusik & Zonstein, 2014
- Geraesta lehtineni Benjamin, 2011
- Hahnia lehtineni Brignoli, 1978
- Indophantes lehtineni Saaristo & Tanasevitch, 2003
- Lathys lehtineni Kovblyuk, Kastrygina & Omelko, 2014
- Lycosoides lehtineni Marusik & Guseinov, 2003 (Now Lycosoides coarctata (Dufour, 1831))
- Maro lehtineni Saaristo, 1971
- Miagrammopes lehtineni (Wunderlich, 1976)
- Nanometa lehtineni (Marusik & Omelko, 2017)
- Qiyunia lehtineni Song & Xu, 1989
- Spiracme lehtineni (Fomichev, Marusik & Koponen, 2014)
- Styloctetor lehtineni Marusik & Tanasevitch, 1998
- Synagelides lehtineni Logunov & Hereward, 2006
- Synaphosus lehtineni Marusik & Omelko, 2018
- Synaphris lehtineni Marusik, Gnelitsa & Kovblyuk, 2005
- Tegenaria lehtineni (Guseinov, Marusik & Koponen, 2005)
- Titanoeca lehtineni Fet, 1986
