= List of six-eyed spiders =

Six-eyed spiders are spiders that, unlike most spider species, lack the principal pair of eyes, leaving them with only six eyes instead of the usual eight.

== List ==
- Araneomorphae

- Haplogynae

- Scytodoidea—superfamily of six-eyed spiders

- Drymusidae
- Periegopidae
- Scytodes
- Sicariidae

- Leptonetoidea—superfamily of six-eyed spiders

- Leptonetidae
- Ochyroceratidae
- Telemidae—predominantly six-eyed, but some species with none.

- Pholcoidea

- Diguetidae—family of six-eyed spiders
- Pholcidae—predominantly eight-eyed, but some species with six.

- Pholcinae

- Belisana

- Belisana aliformis (at Wikispecies)
- Belisana huberi (at Wikispecies)
- Belisana lamellaris (at Wikispecies)
- Belisana zhangi (at Wikispecies)

- Khorata

- Khorata diaoluoshanensis (at Wikispecies)

- Caponioidea

- Caponiidae—family with species with 8, 6, 4 and 2 eyes and some with a variable number of eyes
- Tetrablemmidae

- Dysderoidea—superfamily of six-eyed spiders

- Dysderidae
- Oonopidae
- Orsolobidae
- Segestriidae
- Trogloraptoridae

- Entelegynae

- Archaeoidea

- Micropholcommatidae

- Micropholcommatinae

- Micropholcommatini

- Austropholcomma

- Austropholcomma walpole (at Wikispecies)

- Araneoidea

- Anapidae

- Comaroma

- Comaroma hatsushibai (at Wikispecies)

- Dictynoidea

- Cybaeidae

- Cybaeus

- Cybaeus yoshiakii (at Wikispecies)

- Dictynidae—predominantly eight-eyed, but some species with six.

== Bibliography ==
- Davidovici, Batya B.; Wolf, Ronni (2009). Jean Revuz; Jean-Claude Roujeau; Francisco Kerdel; Laurence Valeyrie-Allanore (eds.). "Noxious Spider Bites". Life-Threatening Dermatoses and Emergencies in Dermatology. Springer Science+Business Media: 215–222. doi:10.1007/978-3-540-79339-7_23. ISBN 978-3540793397.
- Deeleman-Reinhold, Christa L. (2001). Forest Spiders of South East Asia: With a Revision of the Sac and Ground Spiders. Brill Publishers. ISBN 978-9004119598.
- Eaton, Eric R.; Kaufman, Kenn (2007). Kaufman Field Guide to Insects of North America. Houghton Mifflin Harcourt. ISBN 978-0618153107.
- Filmer, Martin R. (1991). Southern African Spiders: An Identification Guide. Random House. ISBN 978-1868251889.
- Rix, Mihael G.; Harvey, Mark S. (2010). The Spider Family Micropholcommatidae (Arachnida: Araneae: Araneoidea): A Relimitation and Revision at the Generic Level. Pensoft Publishers. ISBN 978-9546425317.
