= List of Plectreuridae species =

This page lists all described species of the spider family Plectreuridae accepted by the World Spider Catalog as of December 2020:

== Kibramoa ==
Kibramoa Chamberlin, 1924

- K. guapa Gertsch, 1958 — USA, Mexico
- K. hermani Chamberlin & Ivie, 1935 — USA
- K. isolata Gertsch, 1958 — Mexico
- K. madrona Gertsch, 1958 — USA
- K. paiuta Gertsch, 1958 — USA
- K. suprenans (Chamberlin, 1919) (type) — USA
  - K. s. pima Gertsch, 1958 — USA
- K. yuma Gertsch, 1958 — USA

== † Palaeoplectreurys ==
† Palaeoplectreurys Wunderlich, 2004

- † P. baltica Wunderlich, 2004

== Plectreurys ==
Plectreurys

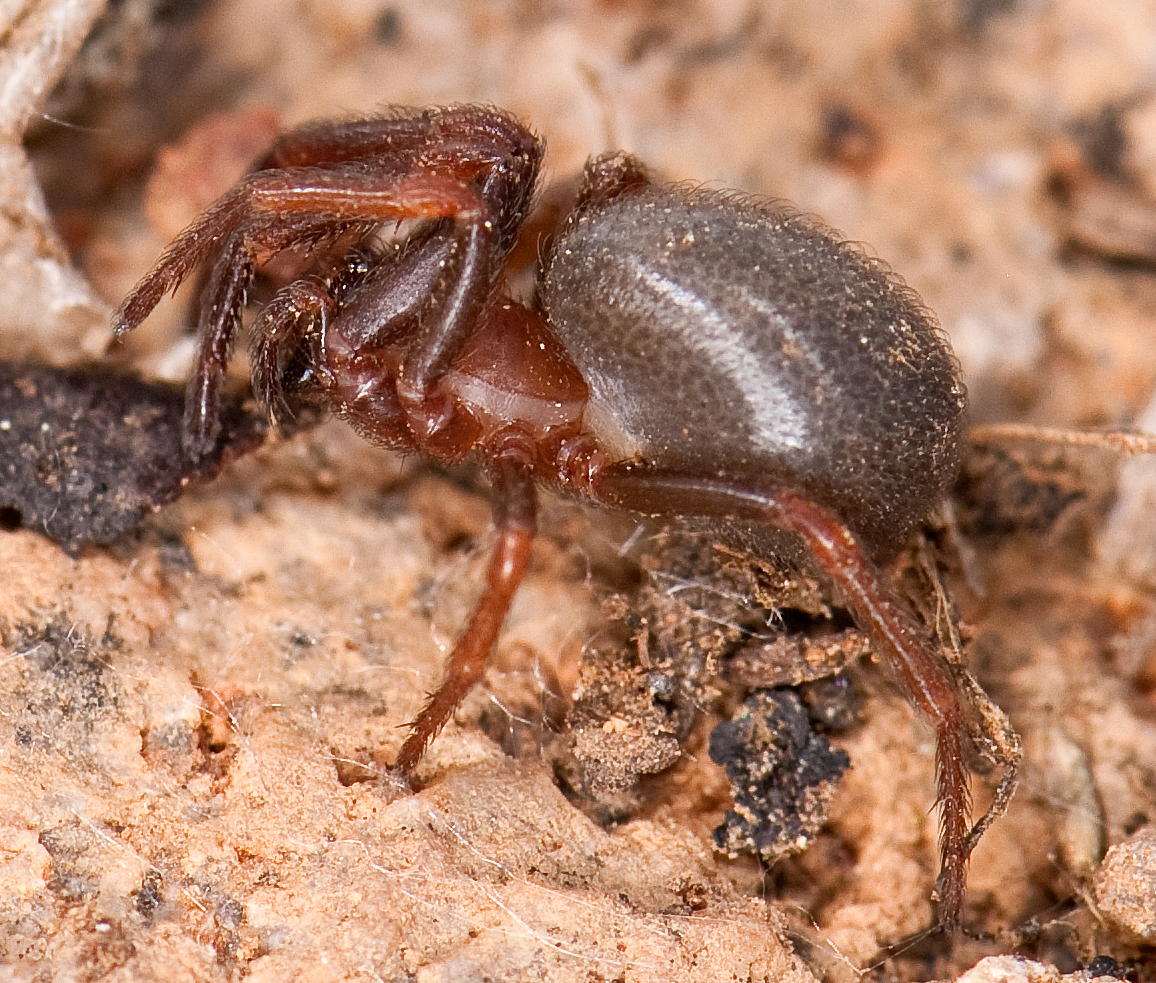
Plectreurys castanea

Plectreurys Simon, 1893

- P. angela Gertsch, 1958 — USA
- P. ardea Gertsch, 1958 — Mexico
- P. arida Gertsch, 1958 — Mexico
- P. bicolor Banks, 1898 — Mexico
- P. castanea Simon, 1893 — USA
- P. ceralbona Chamberlin, 1924 — Mexico
- P. conifera Gertsch, 1958 — USA
- P. deserta Gertsch, 1958 — USA
- P. globosa Franganillo, 1931 — Cuba
- P. hatibonico Alayón, 2003 — Cuba
- P. janzeni Alayón & Víquez, 2011 — Guatemala to Costa Rica
- P. misteca Gertsch, 1958 — Mexico
- P. mojavea Gertsch, 1958 — USA
- P. monterea Gertsch, 1958 — USA
- P. nahuana Gertsch, 1958 — Mexico
- P. oasa Gertsch, 1958 — USA
- P. paisana Gertsch, 1958 — Mexico
- P. schicki Gertsch, 1958 — USA
- P. tecate Gertsch, 1958 — Mexico
- P. tristis Simon, 1893 (type) — USA, Mexico
- P. valens Chamberlin, 1924 — Mexico
- P. vaquera Gertsch, 1958 — Mexico
- P. zacateca Gertsch, 1958 — Mexico
