= List of Diguetidae species =

This page lists all described species of the spider family Diguetidae accepted by the World Spider Catalog as of December 2020:

== Diguetia ==
Diguetia

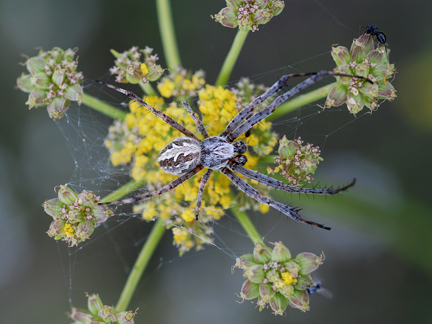
Desert bush spider
(Diguetia canities)

Diguetia Simon, 1895

- D. albolineata (O. Pickard-Cambridge, 1895) — USA, Mexico
- D. andersoni Gertsch, 1958 — USA
- D. canities (McCook, 1890) (type) — USA, Mexico
  - D. c. dialectica Chamberlin, 1924 — Mexico
  - D. c. mulaiki Gertsch, 1958 — USA
- D. catamarquensis (Mello-Leitão, 1941) — Argentina
- D. imperiosa Gertsch & Mulaik, 1940 — USA, Mexico
- D. mojavea Gertsch, 1958 — USA
- D. propinqua (O. Pickard-Cambridge, 1896) — Mexico
- D. signata Gertsch, 1958 — USA, Mexico
- D. stridulans Chamberlin, 1924 — Mexico

== Segestrioides ==
Segestrioides Keyserling, 1883

- S. badia (Simon, 1903) — Brazil
- S. bicolor Keyserling, 1883 (type) — Peru
- S. copiapo Platnick, 1989 — Chile
- S. tofo Platnick, 1989 — Chile
