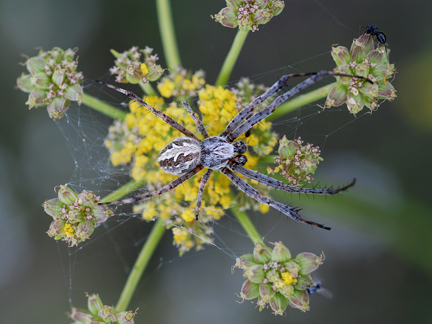
- D. canities

Scientific classification
- Kingdom: Animalia
- Phylum: Arthropoda
- Subphylum: Chelicerata
- Class: Arachnida
- Order: Araneae
- Infraorder: Araneomorphae
- Family: Diguetidae
- Genus: Diguetia; Simon, 1895

Type species
- D. canities (McCook, 1890)

Species
- 12, see text

= Diguetia =

Genus of spiders

Diguetia is a genus of coneweb spiders that was first described by Eugène Simon in 1895. Members of this genus are six-eyed spiders that are either white or patterned. They are common in the southwestern United States and Mexico, and one species is found in Argentina. In the United States, species have been found in Arizona, California, Nevada, New Mexico, and Texas. These spiders build a tubular retreat at the tip of their tent-like webs. Once an insect is caught in the web, the spider bites it and injects venom to stop its prey from moving, later wrapping it in silk. Both males and females use stridulation while mating, with females also stridulating when harassed. Two species of jumping spiders feed on its eggs. There are eleven Diguetia species.

== Identification ==
The species in the genus are haplogynes that have flat oval carapaces and six eyes which are arranged into three groups of two, known as dyads. The abdomen is either white or has patterns, with some species having bands on their legs. Diguetia species have three tarsal claws. Although all spiders may have such features, only spiders of this genus have a combination of those features.

== Habitat and diet ==
The genus is common in the southwestern United States and Mexico, with the exception of one Argentinian species. In the United States, species have been found in Arizona, California, Nevada, New Mexico, and Texas. The most common species in the U.S. are D. canities and the smaller D. albolineata. These spiders build an unusual tent-like web, often between cacti, that somewhat resembles the webs of Linyphiidae. They build a tubular retreat at the tip, camouflaged with leaf litter or similar substances, where thin egg sacs are positioned. The retreat is built in the center out of dead plant material, parts of insects, and insect exoskeleton remains. A horizontal piece of web stretches from the entrance and the spider uses it as platform to move from the bottom. Surrounding the web and retreat are threads which are connected to vegetation. Its web is able to survive strong winds.

Once an insect is caught in the web, the spider bites it and injects venom to stop its prey from moving. The spider later wraps silk around its prey to hold it still or to bring the insect's wings together by its body. The feeding of the genus is believed to be close to that of earlier discovered spiders of webs that are suspended in the air due to them evolving from only using venom to capture prey, to using both venom and web. This form of capture allows the spider to bite the insect several times.

== Reproduction ==
Not much is known about its reproduction cycle, but it is known that both males and females use stridulation while mating; if a female is harassed, it stridulates for a short period, making a loud enough noise for humans to hear.

The females become mature during the beginning of summer and they produce their first egg sacs in August, continuing to produce them through September. The egg sacs are shaped like a discus and are stacked together. As many as 10 egg sacs are produced per female, each egg sac holding 150 to 250 eggs, for a total of over a thousand eggs. Less than 1% of the eggs will survive to maturity. The female will at first protect her eggs from predators, such as from the jumping spiders Metaphidippus manni and Habronattus tranquillus. However, when she dies, the jumping spiders will invade and lay their eggs in the retreat. The eggs of the jumping spiders hatch first, and both their offspring and the adults will feed on the Diguetia eggs and juveniles. Larva of the clerid beetle Phyllobaenus discoideus is also a potential predator of Diguetia eggs.

== Species ==
As of October 2025, this genus includes eleven species and one subspecies:

- Diguetia albolineata (O. Pickard-Cambridge, 1895) – United States, Mexico
- Diguetia andersoni Gertsch, 1958 – United States
- Diguetia balandra Jiménez, Cardiel & Chamé-Vázquez, 2022 – Mexico
- Diguetia canities (McCook, 1890) – United States, Mexico (type species)
  - D. c. mulaiki Gertsch, 1958 – United States
- Diguetia catamarquensis (Mello-Leitão, 1941) – Argentina
- Diguetia dialectica Chamberlin, 1924 – Mexico
- Diguetia imperiosa Gertsch & Mulaik, 1940 – United States, Mexico
- Diguetia mojavea Gertsch, 1958 – United States
- Diguetia propinqua (O. Pickard-Cambridge, 1896) – Mexico
- Diguetia signata Gertsch, 1958 – United States, Mexico
- Diguetia stridulans Chamberlin, 1924 – Mexico
