= Eoplectreurys =

Eoplectreurys Temporal range: Middle or Late Jurassic, 164 Ma

Scientific classification
- Kingdom: Animalia
- Phylum: Arthropoda
- Subphylum: Chelicerata
- Class: Arachnida
- Order: Araneae
- Infraorder: Araneomorphae
- Family: Plectreuridae
- Genus: †Eoplectreurys; Selden & Huang, 2010

Type species
- †Eoplectreurys gertschi Selden & Huang, 2010

Extinct genus of spiders

Eoplectreurys is an extinct monotypic genus of spider from the family Plectreuridae, with a sole species, Eoplectreurys gertschi. The fossils of Eoplectreurys were recovered from the ~164 Ma old Middle Jurassic Daohugou formation tuffs in Inner Mongolia, China.

== History and classification ==
The type specimens are deposited in the Nanjing Institute of Geology and Palaeontology with the genus being described from a total of seven adult spiders. Eoplectreurys was first studied and described by Drs Paul Selden and Diying Huang, who published their type description in the journal Naturwissenschaften in 2010. The genus name is a combination of the Greek word eos, which means "dawn", and Plectreurys the name of the modern genus which the fossils closely resemble.

Eoplectreurys is considered the oldest described spider genus of the Haplogynae series, predating the described Haplogynae spiders from Cretaceous ambers in Jordan and Lebanon, and is the oldest member of Plectreuridae. The two other Plectreuridae species described from fossils are both known from specimens preserved in amber with Palaeoplectreurys baltica from Eocene Baltic amber and Plectreurys pittfieldi from early Miocene Dominican amber. The modern distribution of Plectreuridae is restricted to Southwestern North America, Central America, and parts of the Greater Antilles. The current restricted range of the family may be due to either the severe cooling at the Eocene–Oligocene transition or the Pliocene–Pleistocene ice age.

== Description ==
The specimens of Eoplectreurys are preserved as compression fossils in the fine-grained lacustrian rocks and thus have been flattened from their dimensions in life. Due to the lack of exterior genitalia on females, it is very difficult to identify possible Eoplectreurys females from among the number of Haplogynae spiders found in the Daohugou formation. Only one specimen is a possible match, having a carapace that is round as in the Eoplectreurys males, while the other known Haplogynae female specimens possess elongated carapaces. Only one other family of spiders, Segestriidae, is similar to the fossils. However the legs of Segestriidae have more spines than the fossils and the overall carapace shape of Segestriids is elongated, with maxillae that do not meet in front of the labium. On average Eoplectreurys was a small spider with the average body length, not including legs, being 3 millimetres (0.30 cm). The fossils display fused chelicerae, distinctly short legs, and are ecribellate, that is, without the silk spinning organ called a cribellum. The number of eyes is not distinguishable in the fossils and the stridulating file on the pedipalps are not apparent or not present. Eoplectreurys is most similar in structure to the P. tristis group of Plectreurys.

The species lived around a lake in a volcanically active area and was found in fine-grained volcanic ash lacustrine (lake-bed) deposits, the ash helping to preserve the specimens.
