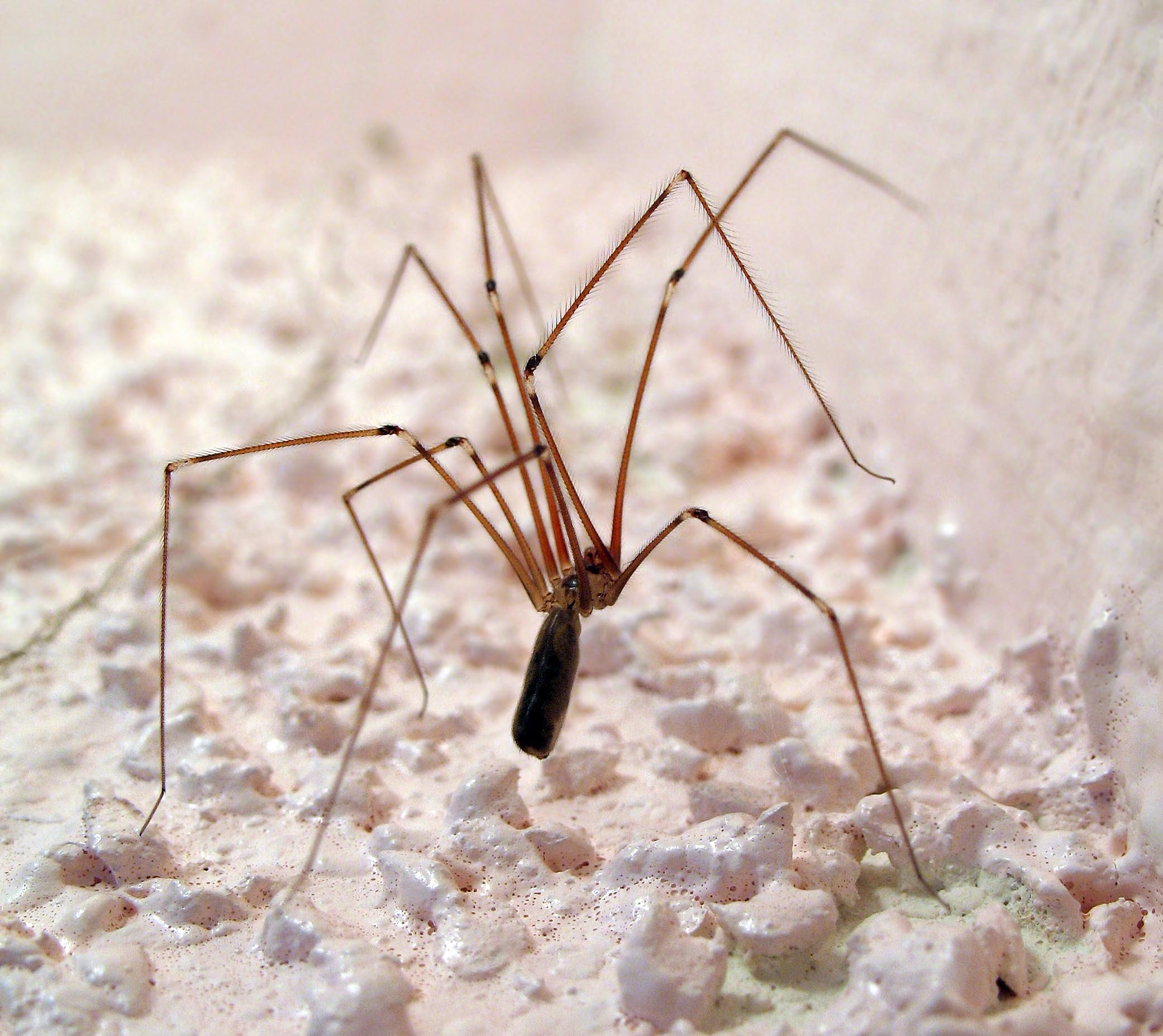
- Pholcus sp., Pholcidae

Scientific classification
- Kingdom: Animalia
- Phylum: Arthropoda
- Subphylum: Chelicerata
- Class: Arachnida
- Order: Araneae
- Infraorder: Araneomorphae
- Superfamily: Pholcoidea; C.L. Koch, 1851

Families
- See text.

= Pholcoidea =

Pholcoidea Temporal range: Middle Jurassic - Holocene, 164–0 Ma

Superfamily of spiders

The Pholcoidea or pholcoids are a superfamily of araneomorph spiders. The group has been circumscribed to contain the following three families:

- Diguetidae
- Pholcidae
- Plectreuridae

== Phylogeny ==
A phylogenetic study based on morphology has shown weak support for the monophyly of the group, as opposed to an earlier hypothesis that two of the families, Diguetidae and Plectreuridae, should be separated from the third in a larger superfamily, Sicarioidea. Pholcoid families are placed in the Haplogynae, spiders with simpler copulatory structures than other araneomorphs. The internal phylogeny of the group is shown in the following cladogram:

- - Pholcidae
  - - Diguetidae
    - Plectreuridae
