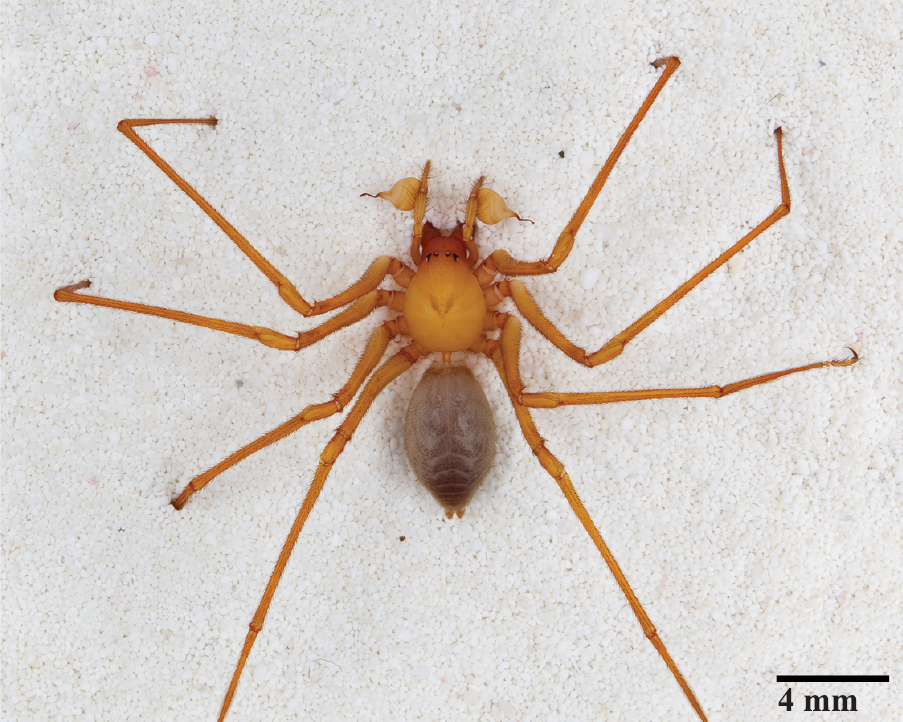
- Male Trogloraptor marchingtoni
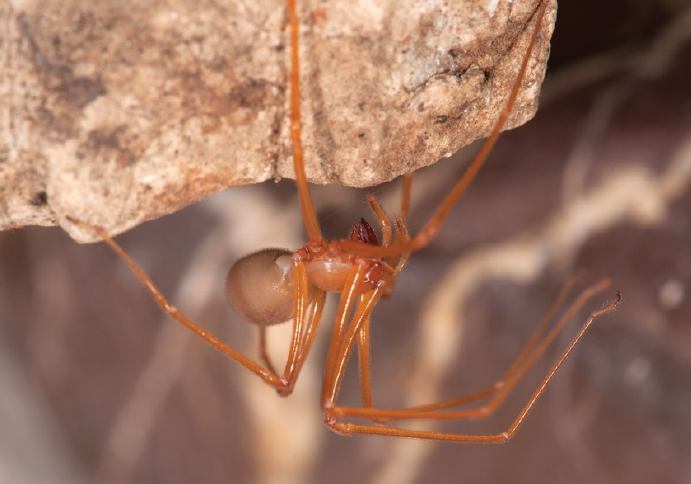
- Female

Scientific classification
- Kingdom: Animalia
- Phylum: Arthropoda
- Subphylum: Chelicerata
- Class: Arachnida
- Order: Araneae
- Infraorder: Araneomorphae
- Family: Trogloraptoridae; Griswold, Audisio & Ledford, 2012
- Genus: Trogloraptor; Griswold, Audisio & Ledford, 2012

= Trogloraptor =

Genus of spiders

Trogloraptor is a genus of large spiders found in the caves of southwestern Oregon. It is the only genus in the family Trogloraptoridae, and includes only two species, Trogloraptor marchingtoni and Trogloraptor tulishpun. They are remarkable for having hook-like claws on the raptorial last segments of their legs.

Trogloraptor belongs to one of only three new spider families described since 1990. The specific name of the first described species is in honor of the amateur cave biologist and deputy sheriff Neil Marchington.

== Discovery ==
Spiders placed in the genus Trogloraptor were first collected in 2010 by Geo Graening, Neil Marchington, Ron Davis and Daniel Snyder, cave conservationists from the Western Cave Conservancy. They were described in 2012 by a research team consisting of arachnologists Charles Griswold, Tracy Audisio and Joel Ledford of the California Academy of Sciences, who placed them in the new species Trogloraptor marchingtoni. The male holotype of this species was recovered from the M2 cave near Grants Pass, Oregon, on July 29, 2010. The female holotype was recovered from a cave in Josephine County, Oregon, on September 16, 2010.

Lead researcher Griswold claimed that Trogloraptor might explain the legends of giant cave spiders in the area. The discovery is also notable because only two other new spider families have been described since 1990. The American arachnologist Norman I. Platnick commented that it was "...as fascinating to arachnologists as the discovery of a new dinosaur is to paleontologists."

== Taxonomy ==
Trogloraptor is the only genus in the monotypic family Trogloraptoridae. It was initially suggested that Trogloraptor was a primitive member of the six-eyed spider superfamily Dysderoidea. However, Trogloraptor exhibits several unique features, including primitive respiratory systems, that justify its assignment to a separate family. The family probably diverged from other spiders about 130 million years ago, which would make it another notable relict taxon from North America. A 2014 study based on ribosomal DNA found that Trogloraptor fell outside the Dysderoidea and concluded that it should not be included in this clade.

The specific name of the first described species is in honor of Neil Marchington. The generic name Trogloraptor means "cave robber", in reference to the spider's habitat and hooked raptorial tarsi.

A second species, Trogloraptor tulishpun was described in 2026.

== Distribution ==
Additional live specimens of Trogloraptor marchingtoni recovered in 2010 and 2011 from Oregon were all found deep inside caves. Except for a single juvenile specimen recovered from the understory debris of old growth redwood forests of northwest California, none have been found outside the caves. This specimen has different markings than T. marchingtoni and may represent a new undescribed species.

Trogloraptor tulishpun was discovered in lava tubes and shallow caves in four localities in the Columbia River Gorge in northwestern Oregon.

The family Trogloraptoridae may have had a wider distribution given that redwood forests encompassed a far greater area in North America during the Pliocene (about 5 mya). Other species may still be present in other caves.

== Description ==
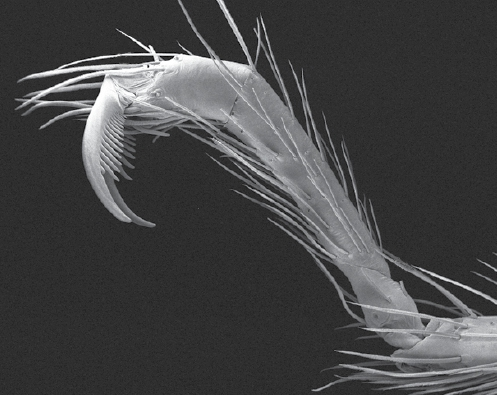
Hook-like claws on the raptorial tarsus IV of a female specimen

Adults of Trogloraptor marchingtoni have six eyes and a body length of about 7 to 10 mm (0.28 to 0.39 in) in males and 8 to 10 mm (0.31 to 0.39 in) in females. With its legs outstretched, the spider can reach up to 3 in (7.6 cm) in length.

The entire body is yellow-brown, except for a dark brown V-shaped mark on the cephalothorax, the orange-brown chelicerae, and the purple-brown abdomen (opisthosoma) with a series of faint light-colored chevron markings. The carapace is pear-shaped with a heart-shaped sternum. The abdomen is oval and sparsely covered with small bristles (setae). The males possess enlarged piriform pedipalps.

The spiders are unique in the flexible and teethed hook-like claws on the last segments (tarsus) of their legs. These elongated claws resemble those of spiders in the family Gradungulidae of Australia and New Zealand, but the two families are only distantly related. Hooked tarsal claws are also present to a lesser extent in the unrelated genera Doryonychus of Tetragnathidae, Hetrogriffus of Thomisidae and Celaenia of Araneidae.

Trogloraptor tulishpun has the same distinctive tarsi, but can be distinguished from T. marchingtoni by its different color pattern and the height of the clypeus, as well as different vulvar structures in the female and palpal bulbs in the male.

== Ecology ==
Trogloraptor marchingtoni spins simple webs with only a few strands, hung from the roofs of caves. Griswold et al. stated that the claws may have a significant function in capturing prey. Similar to the Nelson cave spider of New Zealand (Spelungula cavernicola, a gradungulid), Trogloraptor probably dangle upside down from their webs, snatching at passing flying insects with their claws. However their exact prey remains unknown. Captured live specimens were raised in climate-controlled laboratory conditions in an effort to find out. These specimens were offered moths, crickets and other spiders as food; but these were declined and the specimens starved after two weeks. This may indicate a preference for very specific prey.

Trogloraptor tulishpun has been seen to eat arachnids and moths. It appears to be one of the top predators in the limited environments in which it occurs.

Like most spiders, Trogloraptor possess venom glands. However, the venom is not known to be harmful to humans. The spiders themselves are very shy and unaggressive. Trogloraptor marchingtoni immediately flees illumination.

== See also ==
- Troglobite, cave-dwelling animals
- List of troglobites
- Cave conservation
- Tayshaneta myopica, the tooth cave spider of Texas
- Meta menardi, the European cave spider
- Tartarus, a genus of ancient cave spiders from Australia
- Dysderidae, woodlouse hunters
- Segestriidae, tube-dwelling spiders
- Cryptomaster behemoth, arachnid discovered in southwest Oregon
