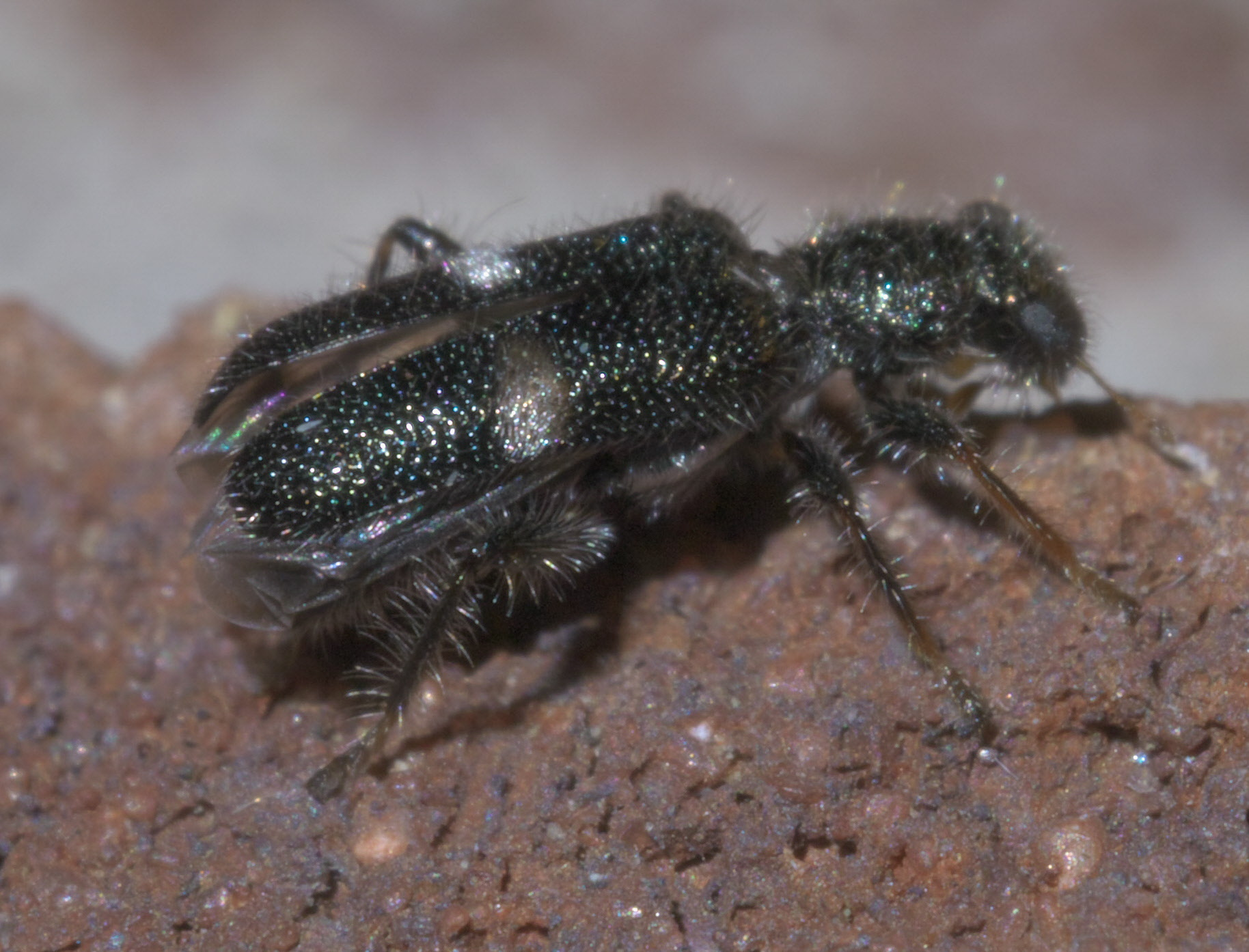

Scientific classification
- Domain: Eukaryota
- Kingdom: Animalia
- Phylum: Arthropoda
- Class: Insecta
- Order: Coleoptera
- Suborder: Polyphaga
- Infraorder: Cucujiformia
- Family: Cleridae
- Genus: Phyllobaenus
- Species: P. unifasciatus

Binomial name
- Phyllobaenus unifasciatus (Say, 1825)

= Phyllobaenus unifasciatus =

Species of beetle

Phyllobaenus unifasciatus is a species of checkered beetle in the family Cleridae. It is found in North America.

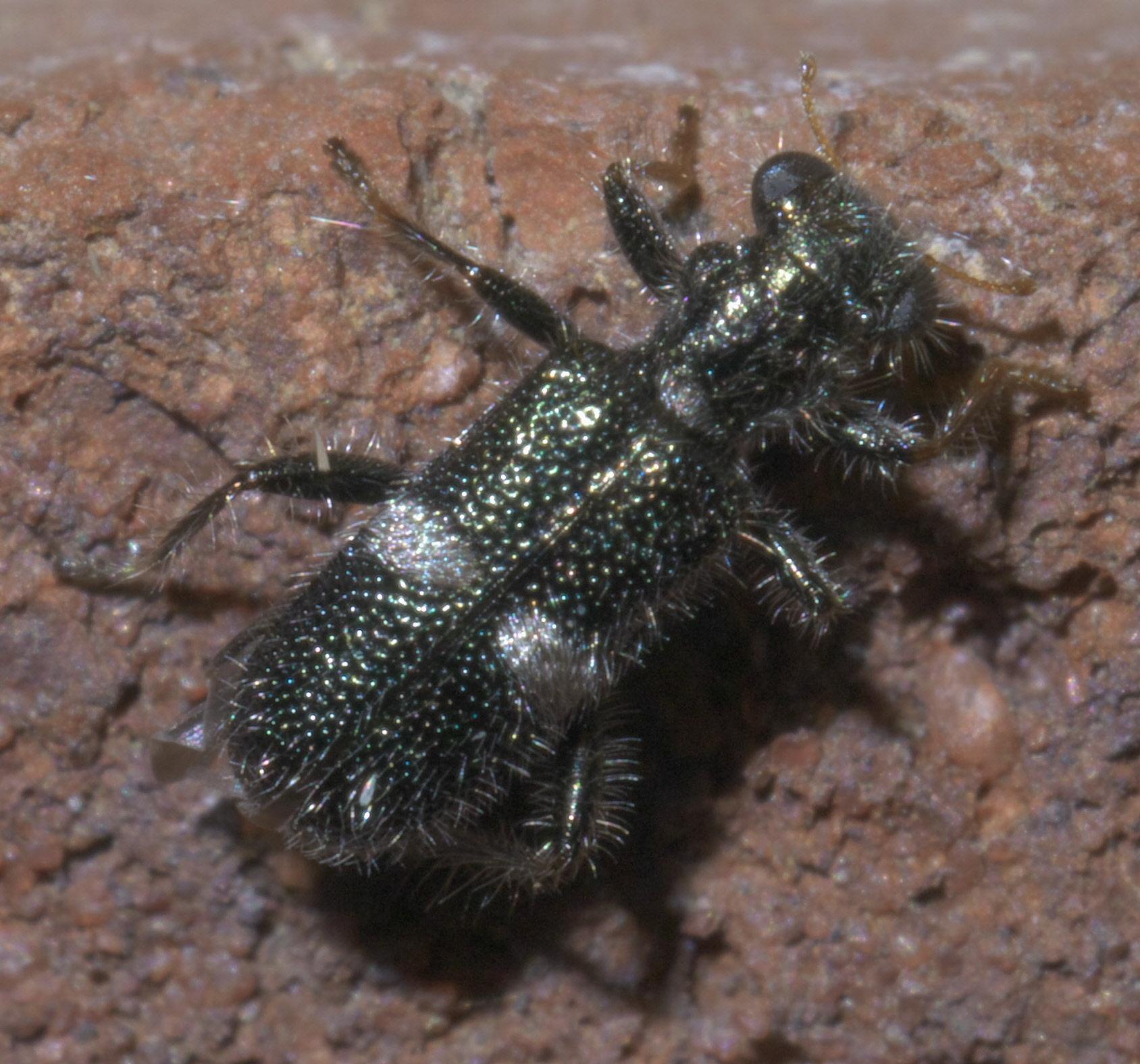
