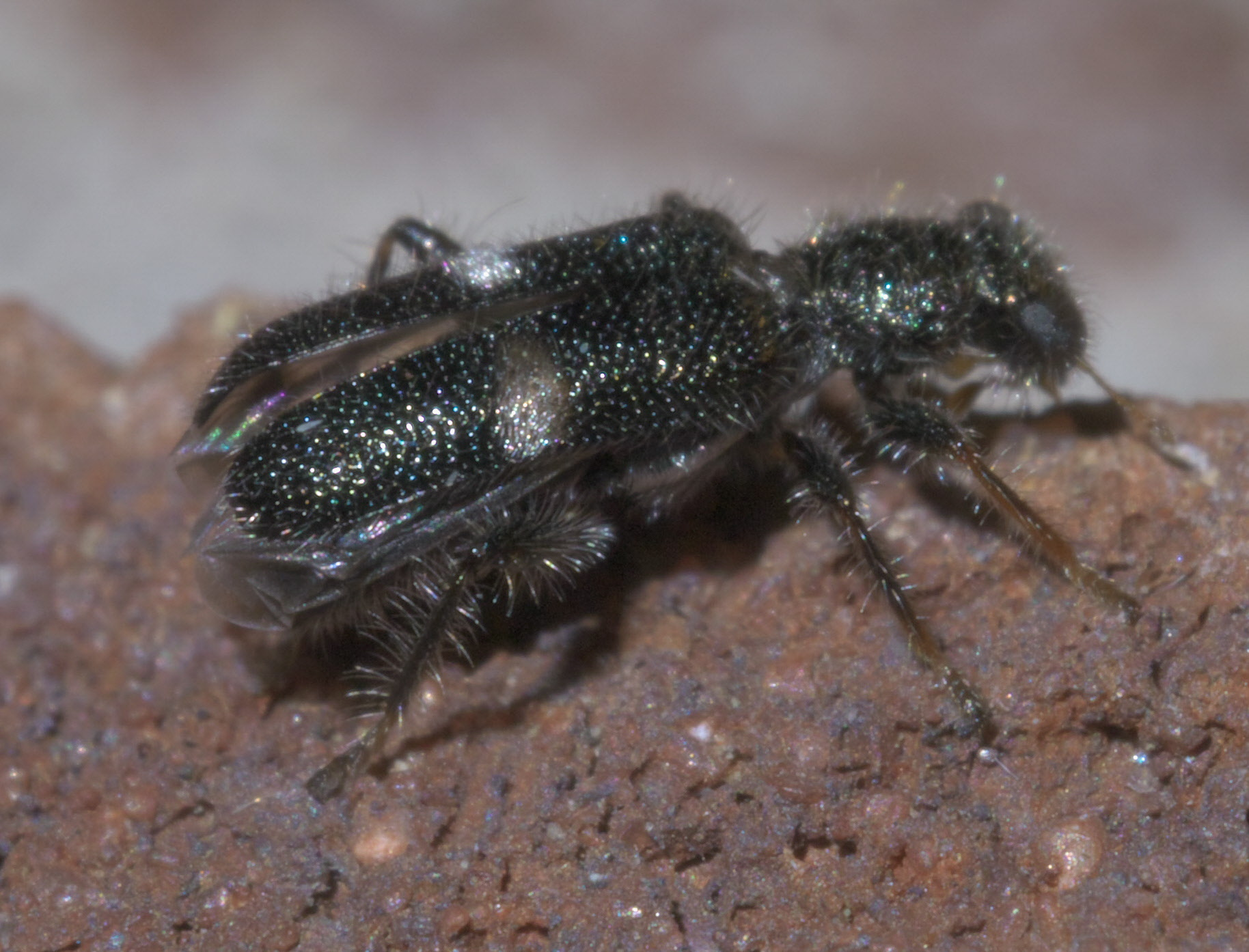
- Phyllobaenus unifasciatus

Scientific classification
- Kingdom: Animalia
- Phylum: Arthropoda
- Class: Insecta
- Order: Coleoptera
- Suborder: Polyphaga
- Infraorder: Cucujiformia
- Family: Cleridae
- Subfamily: Hydnocerinae
- Genus: Phyllobaenus; Dejean, 1837

Synonyms
- Hydnocera Newman, 1838

= Phyllobaenus =

Genus of beetles

Phyllobaenus is a genus of checkered beetles in the family Cleridae. There are at least 60 described species in Phyllobaenus.

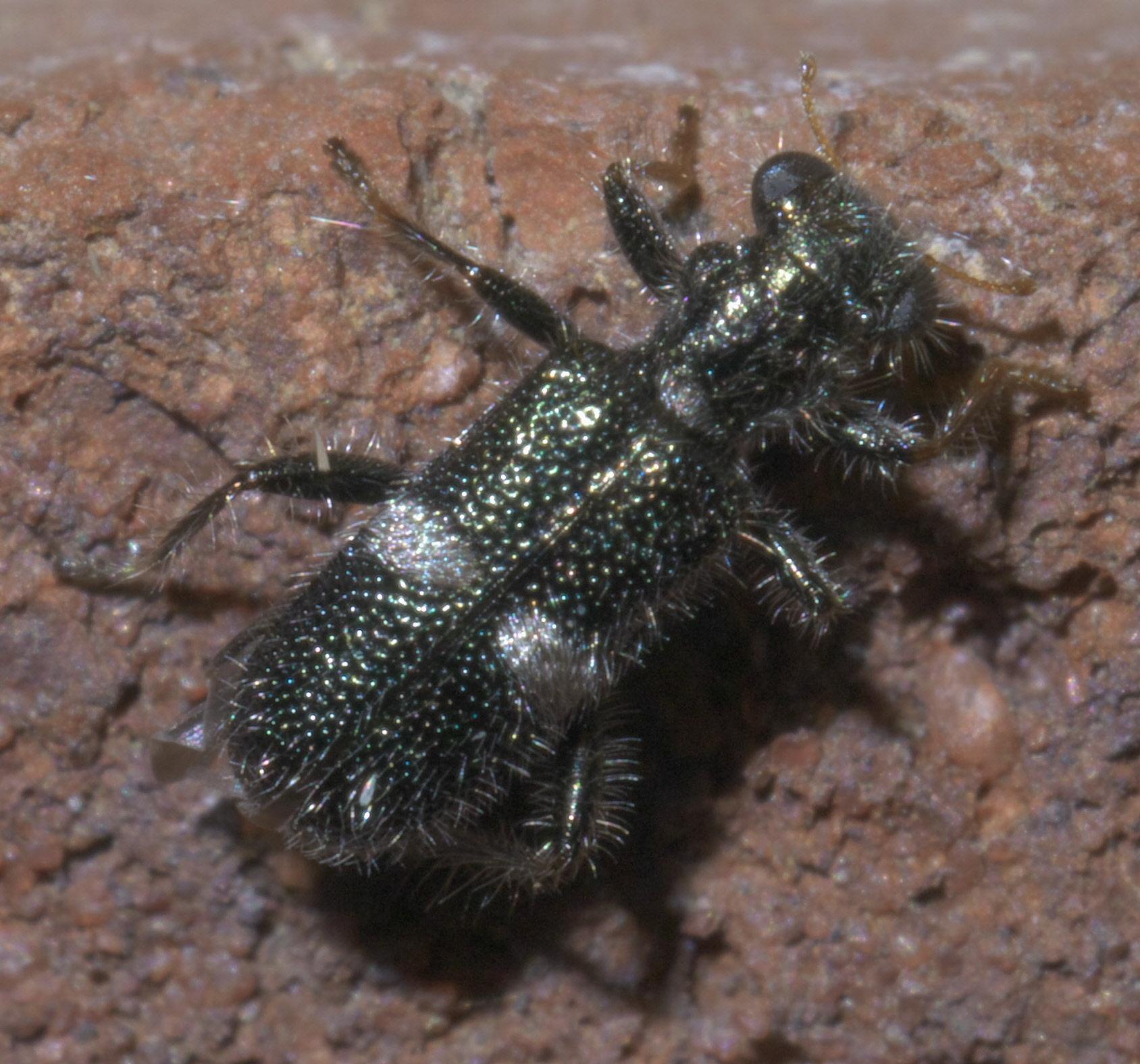
Phyllobaenus unifasciatus

== Species ==
These 62 species belong to the genus Phyllobaenus:

- Phyllobaenus affiliatus (Fall, 1906)
- Phyllobaenus arizonicus (Schaeffer, 1908)
- Phyllobaenus atriplexus Foster, 1981
- Phyllobaenus bicolor (LeConte, 1852)
- Phyllobaenus bimaculatus (Wolcott, 1908)
- Phyllobaenus binotatus (Chapin, 1918)
- Phyllobaenus blanchardi (Wolcott, 1928)
- Phyllobaenus chapini (Wolcott, 1927)
- Phyllobaenus cinctus (Spinola, 1844)
- Phyllobaenus cobaltinus (Chapin, 1922)
- Phyllobaenus coeruleipennis (Wolcott, 1908)
- Phyllobaenus commixtus (Chapin, 1922)
- Phyllobaenus corticinus
- Phyllobaenus cribripennis (Fall, 1906)
- Phyllobaenus cuneiformis (Wolcott, 1928)
- Phyllobaenus cyanitinctus (Fall, 1906)
- Phyllobaenus discoideus (LeConte, 1852)
- Phyllobaenus dubius (Wolcott, 1912)
- Phyllobaenus fallax (Wolcott, 1908)
- Phyllobaenus fuchsi (Schaeffer, 1908)
- Phyllobaenus gahani (Wolcott, 1910)
- Phyllobaenus hamatus (LeConte, 1876)
- Phyllobaenus humeralis (Say, 1823)
- Phyllobaenus iowensis (Chapin, 1922)
- Phyllobaenus knausi (Wickham, 1905)
- Phyllobaenus knausii
- Phyllobaenus lautus Barr, 1960
- Phyllobaenus lecontei (Wolcott, 1912)
- Phyllobaenus longus (LeConte, 1884)
- Phyllobaenus maritimus (Wolcott, 1910)
- Phyllobaenus mirus (Wolcott, 1928)
- Phyllobaenus nigrescens (Schaeffer, 1909)
- Phyllobaenus niveifascia (Schaeffer, 1905)
- Phyllobaenus niveifascius
- Phyllobaenus obscurus
- Phyllobaenus occidentalis (Chapin, 1922)
- Phyllobaenus omoger (Horn, 1894)
- Phyllobaenus pallipennis (Say, 1825)
- Phyllobaenus picipennis (Chapin, 1922)
- Phyllobaenus plagifer (Fall, 1906)
- Phyllobaenus pubescens (LeConte, 1849)
- Phyllobaenus pulcher (Chapin, 1922)
- Phyllobaenus puritanus (Wolcott, 1928)
- Phyllobaenus pygmaeus (Wolcott, 1912)
- Phyllobaenus robustus (Horn, 1868)
- Phyllobaenus rufipes (Newman, 1840)
- Phyllobaenus scaber (LeConte, 1852)
- Phyllobaenus simulans (Schaeffer, 1908)
- Phyllobaenus singularis (Wolcott, 1912)
- Phyllobaenus stupkai Knull, 1949
- Phyllobaenus subaeneus (Spinola, 1844)
- Phyllobaenus subfasciatus (LeConte, 1866)
- Phyllobaenus suturalis (Klug, 1842)
- Phyllobaenus tibialis (Wolcott, 1910)
- Phyllobaenus tricolor (Schaeffer, 1904)
- Phyllobaenus tristis (Schaeffer, 1909)
- Phyllobaenus unifasciatus (Say, 1825)
- Phyllobaenus vandykei Corporaal, 1950
- Phyllobaenus varipunctatus Knull, 1949
- Phyllobaenus verticalis (Say, 1835)
- Phyllobaenus vicinus (Chapin, 1922)
- Phyllobaenus wickhami (Wolcott, 1908)
