= Plectreurys tristis =

Scientific classification
- Kingdom: Animalia
- Phylum: Arthropoda
- Subphylum: Chelicerata
- Class: Arachnida
- Order: Araneae
- Infraorder: Araneomorphae
- Family: Plectreuridae
- Genus: Plectreurys
- Species: P. tristis

Binomial name
- Plectreurys tristis Simon, 1893

Species of spider

Plectreurys tristis (synonym Plectreurys bispinosus Chamberlin) is a species of venomous spiders commonly known as primitive hunting spiders belonging to a family of plectreurid spiders. They produce a venom that contains a group of insecticidal peptides called plectoxins. They are found in western North America, Central America and Mexico.

== Description ==
Plectreurys tristis are large spiders. The adult male can be 12 mm long on its main body, and about 25 mm with legs stretched. The females are still larger in all proportions. The cephalothorax and legs are dark-brown in colour, and have no markings. Unlike other closely related species, the legs are stout and densely hairy, but devoid of the long spines. The body covering, carapace is rough (granulated) and lacks setae. The abdomen is almost rounded and yellowish-grey in colour. The abdominal setae are also similarly coloured. They have eight eyes arranged in two rows.

== Ecology and behavior ==
Plectreurys tristis are the inhabitants of arid and semi-arid regions of south-western North America including California, Nevada, Idaho, Arizona and Utah. Some are also reported from Central America and Mexico. They are found in deserts, dry woodlands, and coniferous forests up to 2,000 m. They make webs under rocks, woods and other materials available on the dry lands of their natural habitats. They also spread to urban areas building webs at all convenient places. Generally, only females and immature ones remain in the web, and adult males wander around especially at night. The spiders are quite visually weak even during hunting, but the venom is powerful for killing or paralysing other arachnids.

== Venom ==
The venom of Plectreurys tristis contains a number of complex compounds. The venom is a calcium channel blocker, specifically inhibiting N-type Ca^{2+} channels, and other unidentified calcium channels. The first novel compound detected was N, N'-bis(4-guanidinobutyl)oxalamide, the major component, but of unknown effects. In addition, there are about 50 different peptide toxins. The most biologically active peptides are collectively called plectoxins, and they show high insecticidal activities on lepidopteran insects.

=== Clinical case ===
The first clinical case of P. tristis bite was reported in 1991. A 15-year-old boy was bitten on the calf of the leg in Kern County, California. He initially experienced severe pain, oedema, and pallor at the site of the wound. After 15 to 30 minutes, his leg became numb which lasted for about an hour. Then the numbness gradually subsided. After 2 hours, all symptoms were gone without any medical intervention.
