= Phyllobaenus scaber =

Scientific classification
- Domain: Eukaryota
- Kingdom: Animalia
- Phylum: Arthropoda
- Class: Insecta
- Order: Coleoptera
- Suborder: Polyphaga
- Infraorder: Cucujiformia
- Family: Cleridae
- Genus: Phyllobaenus
- Species: P. scaber

Binomial name
- Phyllobaenus scaber (LeConte, 1852)

Species of beetle

Phyllobaenus scaber is a species of checkered beetle in the family Cleridae. It is found in North America.
