= Phyllobaenus subfasciatus =

Scientific classification
- Domain: Eukaryota
- Kingdom: Animalia
- Phylum: Arthropoda
- Class: Insecta
- Order: Coleoptera
- Suborder: Polyphaga
- Infraorder: Cucujiformia
- Family: Cleridae
- Genus: Phyllobaenus
- Species: P. subfasciatus

Binomial name
- Phyllobaenus subfasciatus (LeConte, 1866)

Species of beetle

Phyllobaenus subfasciatus is a species of checkered beetle in the family Cleridae. It is found in North America.
