= Phyllobaenus arizonicus =

Scientific classification
- Domain: Eukaryota
- Kingdom: Animalia
- Phylum: Arthropoda
- Class: Insecta
- Order: Coleoptera
- Suborder: Polyphaga
- Infraorder: Cucujiformia
- Family: Cleridae
- Genus: Phyllobaenus
- Species: P. arizonicus

Binomial name
- Phyllobaenus arizonicus (Schaeffer, 1908)

Species of beetle

Phyllobaenus arizonicus is a species of checkered beetle in the family Cleridae.
