= Khorata bangkok =

Scientific classification
- Kingdom: Animalia
- Phylum: Arthropoda
- Subphylum: Chelicerata
- Class: Arachnida
- Order: Araneae
- Infraorder: Araneomorphae
- Family: Pholcidae
- Genus: Khorata
- Species: K. bangkok

Binomial name
- Khorata bangkok Huber, 2005

Species of spider

Khorata bangkok is a species of Araneomorph spider in the family Pholcidae.

== Distribution ==
This species is found in Bangkok, Thailand.

== Description ==
The male holotype measures 2.25 mm (2.30 mm with clypeus).
