= Phyllobaenus verticalis =

Scientific classification
- Kingdom: Animalia
- Phylum: Arthropoda
- Clade: Pancrustacea
- Class: Insecta
- Order: Coleoptera
- Suborder: Polyphaga
- Infraorder: Cucujiformia
- Family: Cleridae
- Genus: Phyllobaenus
- Species: P. verticalis

Binomial name
- Phyllobaenus verticalis (Say, 1835)

Species of beetle

Phyllobaenus verticalis is a species of checkered beetle in the family Cleridae. It is found in North America. Larvae develop within and prey upon wood-boring beetles, and thus can be found in dead hardwood.
