= Diguetia signata =

Scientific classification
- Domain: Eukaryota
- Kingdom: Animalia
- Phylum: Arthropoda
- Subphylum: Chelicerata
- Class: Arachnida
- Order: Araneae
- Infraorder: Araneomorphae
- Family: Diguetidae
- Genus: Diguetia
- Species: D. signata

Binomial name
- Diguetia signata Gertsch, 1958

Species of spider

Diguetia signata is a species of desert shrub spider in the family Diguetidae. It is found in the United States and Mexico.
