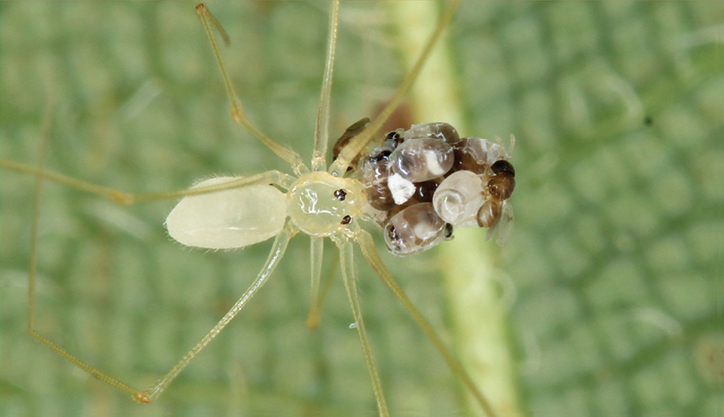

Scientific classification
- Kingdom: Animalia
- Phylum: Arthropoda
- Subphylum: Chelicerata
- Class: Arachnida
- Order: Araneae
- Infraorder: Araneomorphae
- Family: Pholcidae
- Genus: Belisana
- Species: B. khaosok

Binomial name
- Belisana khaosok Huber, 2005

= Belisana khaosok =

Species of spider

Belisana khaosok is a species of cellar spider in the family Pholcidae. B. khaosok is found in Thailand.
