= Dc1a =

Dc1a (β-diguetoxin or DTX9.2) is a potent insect-selective poisonous 57-residue peptide that is produced by the desert bush spider (Diguetia canities). It promotes the opening of voltage-gated Na channels (Na_{v}) in German cockroach German cockroach (Blattella germanica) by interacting with the paddle motif in domain II.

== Etymology and chemical structure ==
Dc1a contains two β-sheets and one β-hairpin loop whereas the sheets are held together by four disulfide bonds. Three of these four disulfide bonds form a classical cysteine knot region (ICK). ICK region is common in spider toxins and provides chemical, thermal and biological stability to the protein. Although this region is evolutionary conserved in the spiders family, it has remarkable differences with other ICK-like proteins. One of the special characteristics is that Dc1a contains an additional disulfide bond that links cysteine 42 with cysteine 45 and stabilizes the serine-rich hairpin loop. Another feature is a unique three-standard antiparallel β-sheet in the amino-terminal region which is formed by an unusually large loop between cysteine 26 and cysteine 40. This difference in structure creates a spatial separation between the ICK domain and the rest of the protein, leaving the charged residues more exposed. However, clusters of hydrophobic residues that could potentially interact with lipid bilayers have not been found.

== Target and mode of action ==
In 1996, Bloomquist et al. conducted experiments to investigate the action mechanisms of Dc1a on flesh fly (Sarcophaga bullata) and housefly (Musca domestica) larvae. They observed that Dc1a injection caused hyperexcitability in both neuromuscular junction and sensory cells and elevated spike charges.

Recent studies have shown that the toxin has only lethal effects on German cockroach (B. germanica) and not on American cockroach (Periplaneta americana). Dc1a acts as a gating modifier. It shifts the voltage dependent activation to more negative values by interacting with domain II in the paddle motifs of the voltage sensing area of Na_{v} channels. As a consequence, Na channels will already open at more negative potentials. Although German and American cockroaches are closely related, they have different kinds of domain II: serine 1 and 2 in Na_{v} channels of the German cockroach form a more accessible angle for the toxin to interact with the channel.

No effects have been found on vertebrate Na_{v} channels, which might be useful in the production of new insecticides.

== Toxicity ==
American cockroach (P.americana) Na_{v} channels are resistant to the toxin's effects because of the different structure in domain II on its Na_{v} channels. Even with relevantly high doses of Dc1a, P.americana has minor contractions in abdominal muscles and reversible reduced motor activity. On the other hand, Dc1a is lethal for the German cockroach (B.germanica) and it induces dose-dependent paralysis 8 hours after injection. KD_{50} value of Dc1a is 3.0 ± 1.2 nmol/g and LD_{50} value of Dc1a is 4.2 ± 3.4 nmol/g for B.germanica.

Human Na_{v} channels are insensitive to Dc1a.
