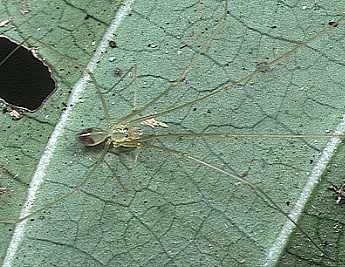
- Male specimen

Scientific classification
- Kingdom: Animalia
- Phylum: Arthropoda
- Subphylum: Chelicerata
- Class: Arachnida
- Order: Araneae
- Infraorder: Araneomorphae
- Family: Pholcidae
- Genus: Belisana
- Species: B. junkoae

Binomial name
- Belisana junkoae Irie, 1997

= Belisana junkoae =

Species of spider

Belisana junkoae is a species of spider in the genus Belisana in the family Pholcidae. It is found in Taiwan and Japan.
