= Belisana keyti =

Scientific classification
- Kingdom: Animalia
- Phylum: Arthropoda
- Subphylum: Chelicerata
- Class: Arachnida
- Order: Araneae
- Infraorder: Araneomorphae
- Family: Pholcidae
- Genus: Belisana
- Species: B. keyti

Binomial name
- Belisana keyti Huber, 2005

Species of spider

Belisana keyti is a species of spider of the genus Belisana. It is endemic to Sri Lanka.

== See also ==
- List of Pholcidae species
