= Speleomaster =

Scientific classification
- Kingdom: Animalia
- Phylum: Arthropoda
- Subphylum: Chelicerata
- Class: Arachnida
- Order: Opiliones
- Family: Cryptomastridae
- Genus: Speleomaster; Briggs, 1974

Genus of harvestmen/daddy longlegs

Speleomaster is a genus of armoured harvestmen in the family Cryptomastridae. There are at least two described species in Speleomaster, both found in lava tubes of the Snake River Plain in southern Idaho.

== Species ==
These two species belong to the genus Speleomaster:

- Speleomaster lexi Briggs, 1974
- Speleomaster pecki Briggs, 1974
