= Khorata qianlei =

Scientific classification
- Kingdom: Animalia
- Phylum: Arthropoda
- Subphylum: Chelicerata
- Class: Arachnida
- Order: Araneae
- Infraorder: Araneomorphae
- Family: Pholcidae
- Genus: Khorata
- Species: K. qianlei

Binomial name
- Khorata qianlei Li, Zhang, Li & Yao, 2025

Species of spider

Khorata qianlei is a species of cellar spider in the family Pholcidae, endemic to Guangxi, China. It was described in 2025 by Chinese arachnologists Jinglin Li, Baisensen Zhang, Shuqiang Li, and Zhiyuan Yao.

== Discovery ==
The species was discovered in 2023 in Duqiaoshan Forest Park, Guangxi, southern China, at an elevation of 187 meters. It inhabits webs constructed between rocks within primary forest environments.

== Description ==
Khorata qianlei is a small spider, with males measuring about 2.3 mm in body length and females approximately 3.1 mm. The body is predominantly yellowish with dark brown markings on the sides and back. The legs are long and slender, typical of cellar spiders.

This species is distinguished from its closest relatives by the shape of its reproductive organs, which are key to identifying spiders. In males, a small structure near the mouthparts called the palp—used to transfer sperm to the female—has a distinctive forked (bifurcated) projection not seen in other species. In females, the internal reproductive system includes tiny plates with openings called pore plates, which are nearly triangular in shape in Khorata qianlei, whereas in related species these plates are more rounded or elliptical.

== Taxonomic significance ==
Khorata qianlei belongs to the digitata group within the genus Khorata. This group includes species that share a distinctive feature in the male reproductive organ: a set of five specific projections or extensions on a structure called the procursus, which is part of the male's sperm-transferring organ (the palp). These projections, shaped like tiny spines or hooks, resemble small fingers. Because of this finger-like appearance, the group was named digitata, derived from the Latin word digitus , meaning "finger". This anatomical trait sets the digitata group apart from other species in the genus, which have different arrangements or numbers of such structures. The group currently includes four species: K. digitata, K. qian, K. qianlei, and K. yuhaoi. The discovery of K. qianlei contributed to a broader taxonomic revision of Khorata, leading researchers to propose nine species groups to better classify the genus's growing diversity.

== Etymology ==
The species was named in honor of Qianle Lu, a Chinese field collector and photographer who has contributed specimens and images to multiple arachnological studies in southern China.
