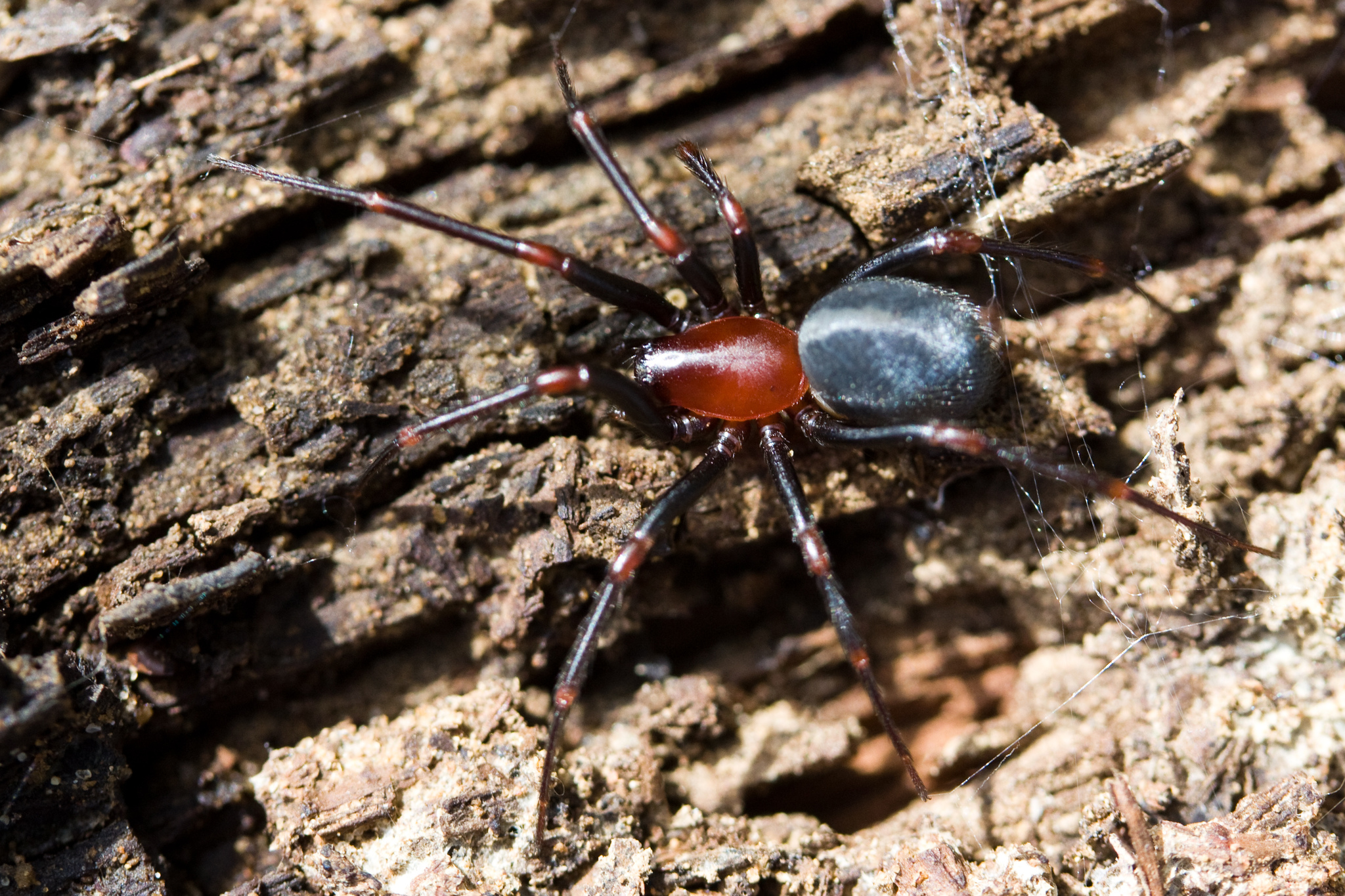

Scientific classification
- Domain: Eukaryota
- Kingdom: Animalia
- Phylum: Arthropoda
- Subphylum: Chelicerata
- Class: Arachnida
- Order: Araneae
- Infraorder: Araneomorphae
- Family: Plectreuridae
- Genus: Kibramoa
- Species: K. madrona

Binomial name
- Kibramoa madrona Gertsch, 1958

= Kibramoa madrona =

Species of spider

Kibramoa madrona is a species of true spider in the family Plectreuridae. It is found in the United States.
