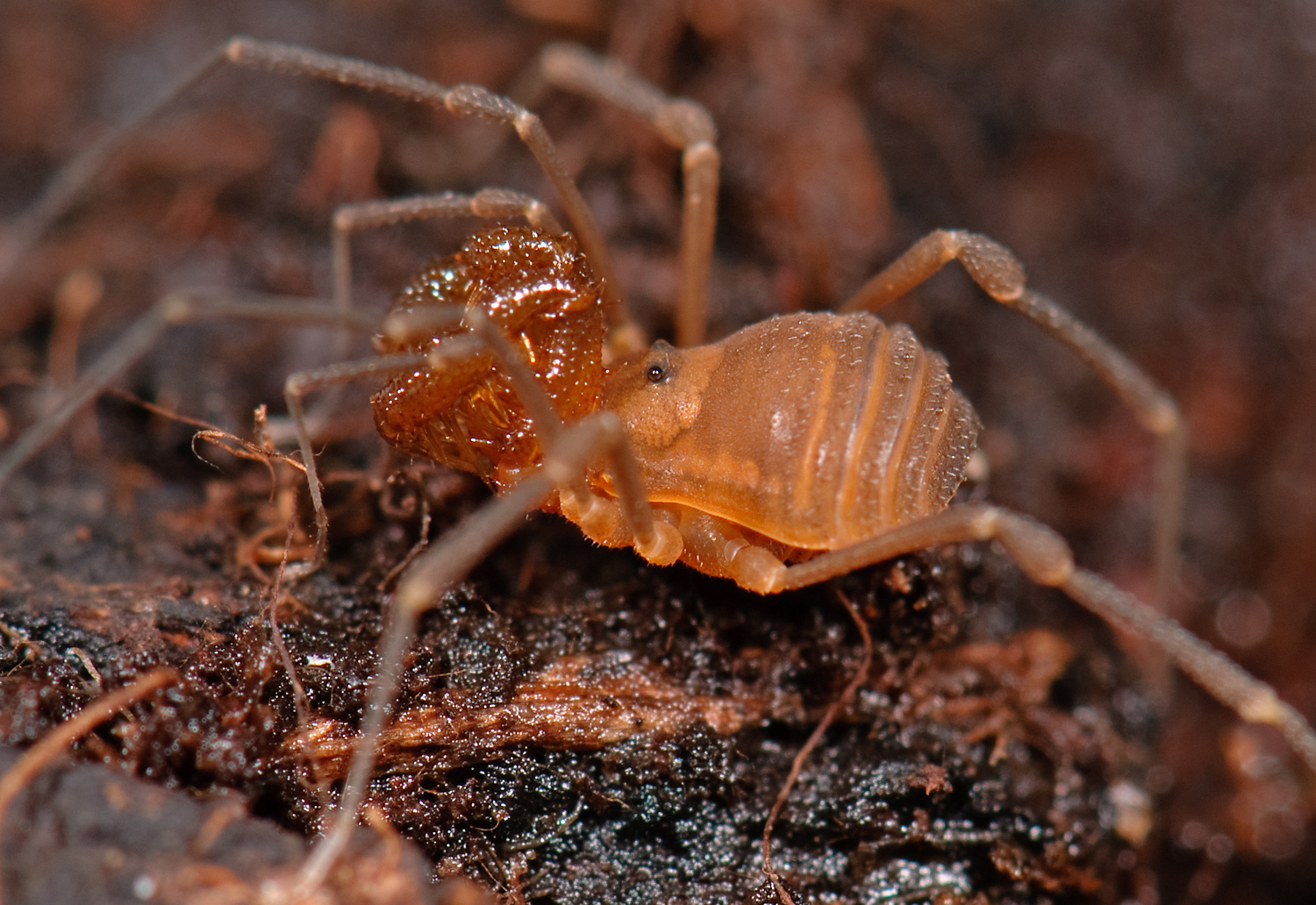

Scientific classification
- Kingdom: Animalia
- Phylum: Arthropoda
- Subphylum: Chelicerata
- Class: Arachnida
- Order: Opiliones
- Family: Cryptomastridae
- Genus: Cryptomaster
- Species: C. leviathan

Binomial name
- Cryptomaster leviathan Briggs, 1969

= Cryptomaster leviathan =

Species of harvestman/daddy longlegs

Cryptomaster leviathan is an opilionid arachnid known from southeastern Oregon. It is named after the Leviathan of the Book of Job in the Hebrew Bible due to its large body size compared to most travunioid Laniatores.

Like its relative C. behemoth, it is found in mature coniferous or mixed coniferous and hardwood forests. However, it has also been found in disturbed forests and forests with few conifers. It is often found under decaying logs and stumps and in the leaf litter of maple trees and Polystichum ferns.
