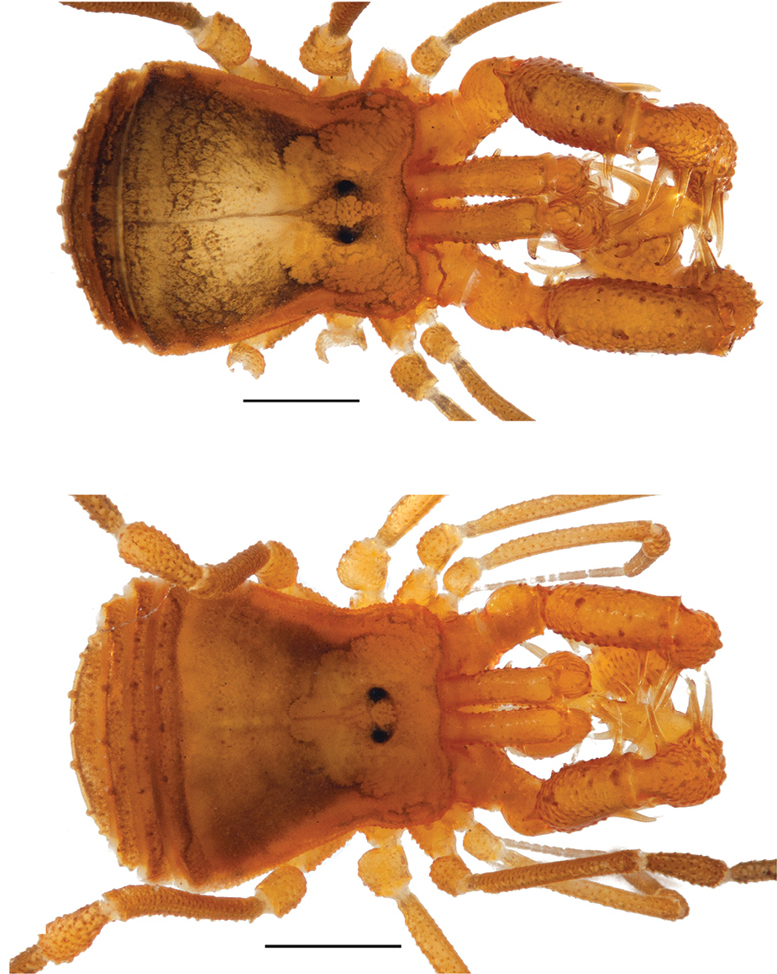
- Male (top) and female

Scientific classification
- Domain: Eukaryota
- Kingdom: Animalia
- Phylum: Arthropoda
- Subphylum: Chelicerata
- Class: Arachnida
- Order: Opiliones
- Family: Cryptomastridae
- Genus: Cryptomaster
- Species: C. behemoth

Binomial name
- Cryptomaster behemoth Starrett & Derkarabetian, 2016

= Cryptomaster behemoth =

Species of harvestman/daddy longlegs

Cryptomaster behemoth is an opilionid arachnid inhabiting large woody debris and bark microhabitat in mature coniferous or mixed coniferous and hardwood forests of the central Cascade Mountains of Oregon, with all initially discovered localities in Lane County.

As with the species name of the other species in the genus, C. leviathan, the specific epithet "behemoth" is derived from the name in the Hebrew language of a large beast mentioned in the Biblical Book of Job, referencing C. behemoth's large body size compared to most travunioid Laniatores. Even though of relatively large size, Cryptomaster species are difficult to find, hence the genus name suggesting that they are masters at staying hidden.
