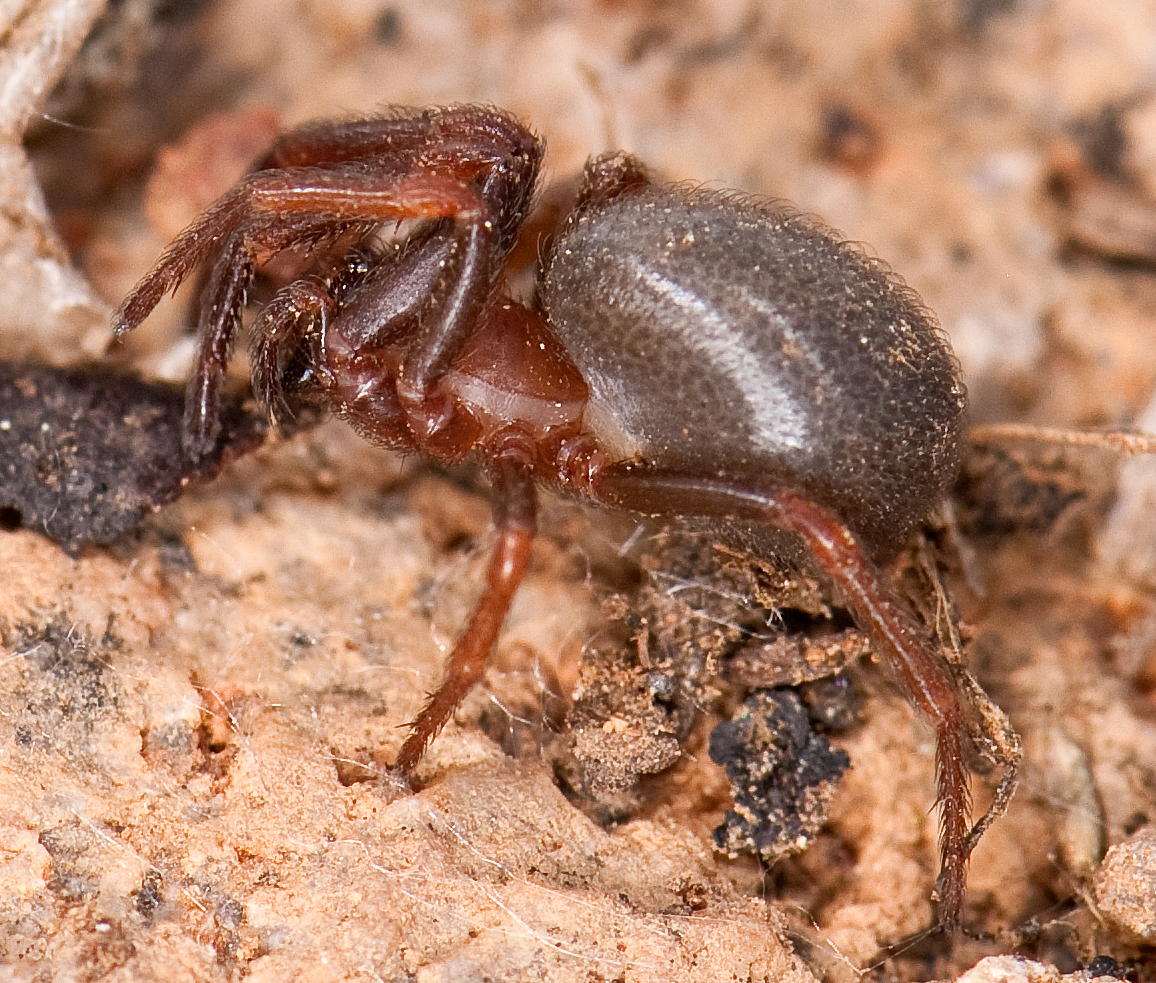
- Female

Scientific classification
- Kingdom: Animalia
- Phylum: Arthropoda
- Subphylum: Chelicerata
- Class: Arachnida
- Order: Araneae
- Infraorder: Araneomorphae
- Family: Plectreuridae
- Genus: Plectreurys
- Species: P. castanea

Binomial name
- Plectreurys castanea Simon, 1893

= Plectreurys castanea =

Species of spider

Plectreurys castanea is a species of spider. They are found in the United States (southern California).
