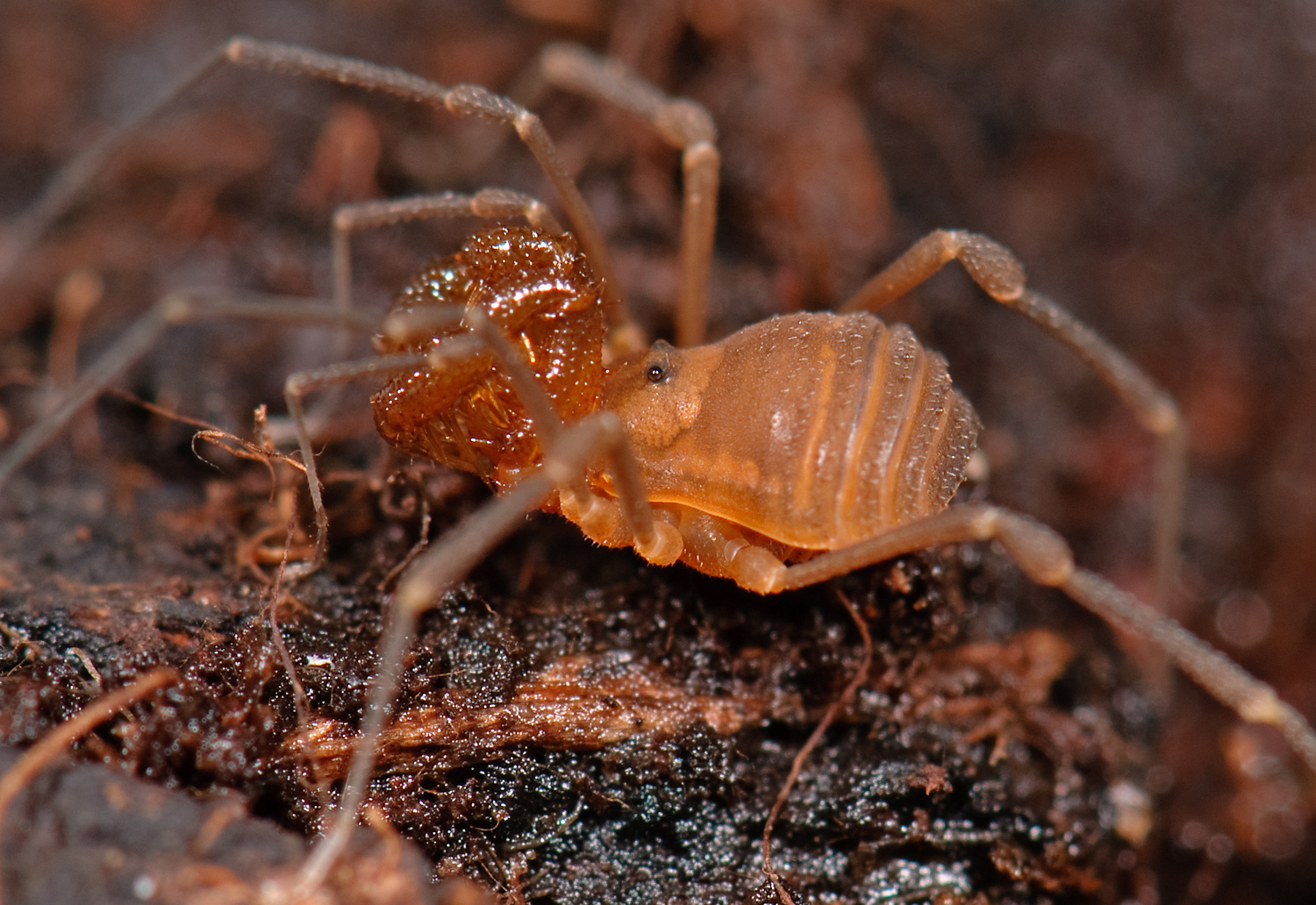
- Cryptomaster leviathan

Scientific classification
- Kingdom: Animalia
- Phylum: Arthropoda
- Subphylum: Chelicerata
- Class: Arachnida
- Order: Opiliones
- Infraorder: Insidiatores
- Superfamily: Travunioidea
- Family: Cryptomastridae
- Genus: Cryptomaster; Briggs, 1969

= Cryptomaster =

Genus of harvestmen/daddy longlegs

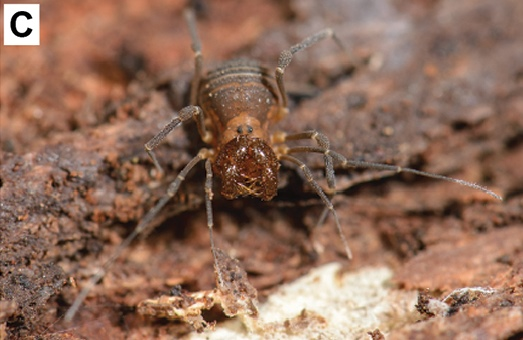
Cryptomaster leviathan

Cryptomaster is a genus of armoured harvestmen in the family Cryptomastridae. There are two described species in Cryptomaster, both found in Oregon.

== Species ==
These two species belong to the genus Cryptomaster:

- Cryptomaster behemoth Starrett & Derkarabetian, 2016
- Cryptomaster leviathan Briggs, 1969
