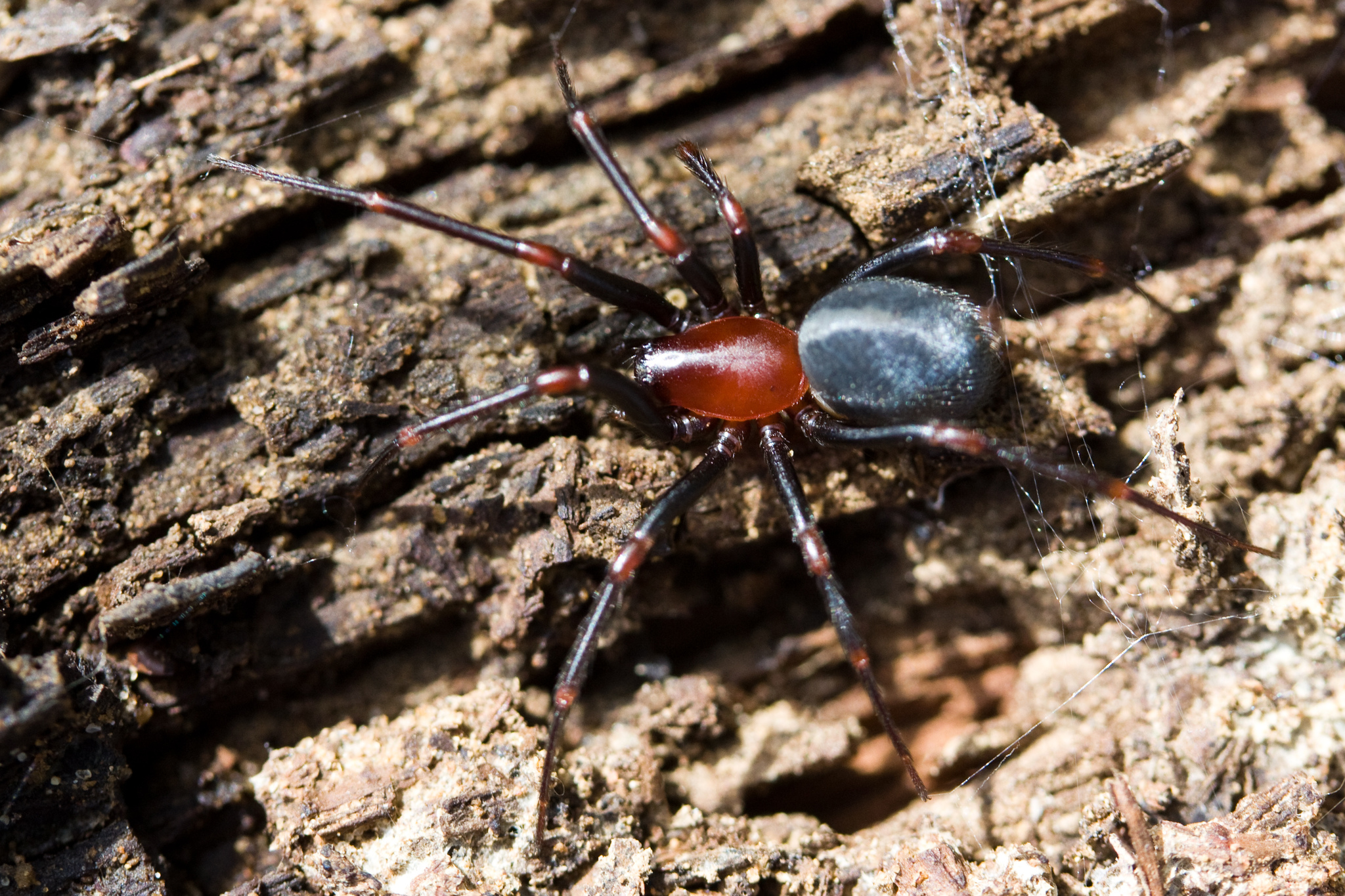
- Kibramoa madrona

Scientific classification
- Kingdom: Animalia
- Phylum: Arthropoda
- Subphylum: Chelicerata
- Class: Arachnida
- Order: Araneae
- Infraorder: Araneomorphae
- Family: Plectreuridae
- Genus: Kibramoa; Chamberlin, 1924

Type species
- K. suprenans (Chamberlin, 1919)

Species
- 7, see text

= Kibramoa =

Genus of spiders

Kibramoa is a genus of North American plectreurid spiders that was first described by Ralph Vary Chamberlin in 1924.

== Species ==
As of June 2019 it contains seven species and one subspecies, found only in Mexico and the United States:

- Kibramoa guapa Gertsch, 1958 – USA, Mexico
- Kibramoa hermani Chamberlin & Ivie, 1935 – USA
- Kibramoa isolata Gertsch, 1958 – Mexico
- Kibramoa madrona Gertsch, 1958 – USA
- Kibramoa paiuta Gertsch, 1958 – USA
- Kibramoa suprenans (Chamberlin, 1919) (type) – USA
  - Kibramoa s. pima Gertsch, 1958 – USA
- Kibramoa yuma Gertsch, 1958 – USA
