= Caponioidea =

Group of spiders

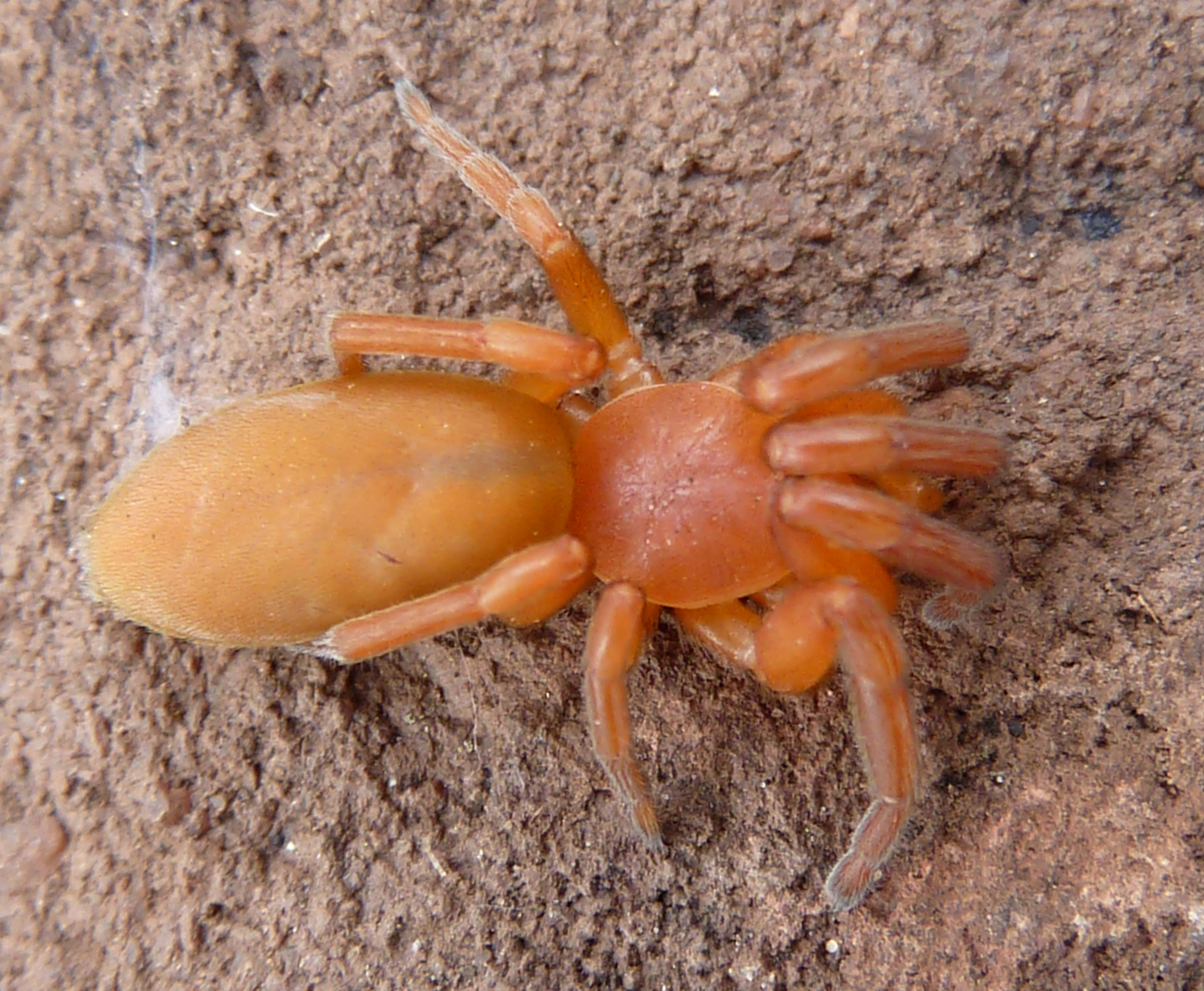
Caponia species

The Caponioidea or caponioids are a group of haplogyne araneomorph spiders that have been treated as superfamily with two members, the families Caponiidae and Tetrablemmidae. Phylogenetic studies from 1991 onwards have shown that the group is not monophyletic, being composed of two basal members of a larger clade. The precise members of that clade differ from study to study; one hypothesis is shown below.

- - Caponiidae
  - - Tetrablemmidae
    - - Segestriidae
      - - Dysderidae
        - - Orsolobidae
          - Oonopidae
