= Segestrioides =

Scientific classification
- Kingdom: Animalia
- Phylum: Arthropoda
- Subphylum: Chelicerata
- Class: Arachnida
- Order: Araneae
- Infraorder: Araneomorphae
- Family: Diguetidae
- Genus: Segestrioides; Keyserling, 1883

Type species
- S. bicolor Keyserling, 1883

Species
- 4, see text

Synonyms
- Pertica Simon, 1903

Genus of spiders

Segestrioides is a genus of South American coneweb spiders that was first described by Eugen von Keyserling in 1883. Originally placed with the recluse spiders, it was moved to the coneweb spiders in 1983.

== Species ==
As of October 2025, this genus includes four species:

- Segestrioides badia (Simon, 1903) – Brazil
- Segestrioides bicolor Keyserling, 1883 – Peru (type species)
- Segestrioides copiapo Platnick, 1989 – Chile
- Segestrioides tofo Platnick, 1989 – Chile
