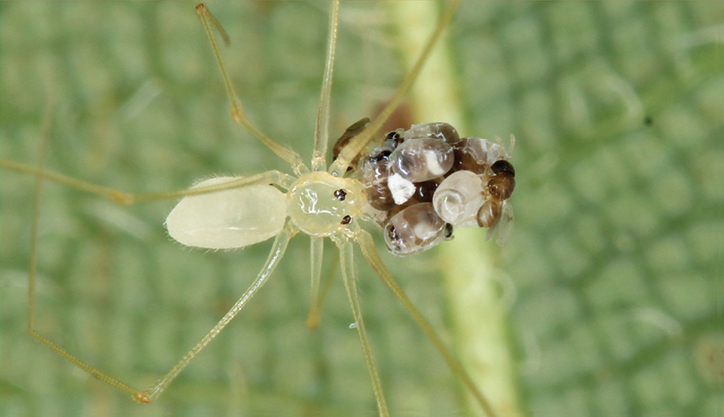
- Belisana khaosok

Scientific classification
- Kingdom: Animalia
- Phylum: Arthropoda
- Subphylum: Chelicerata
- Class: Arachnida
- Order: Araneae
- Infraorder: Araneomorphae
- Family: Pholcidae
- Genus: Belisana; Thorell, 1898

Type species
- B. tauricornis Thorell, 1898

Species
- 143, see text

= Belisana (spider) =

Genus of spiders

Belisana is a genus of cellar spiders that was first described by Tamerlan Thorell in 1898.

== Species ==
As of April 2021 it contains 143 species, found in Asia, Papua New Guinea, on Fiji, in Australia, and Kiribati:

- B. airai Huber, 2005 – Caroline Is.
- B. akebona (Komatsu, 1961) – Japan
- B. aliformis Tong & Li, 2008 – China
- B. amabilis (Paik, 1978) – Korea
- B. ambengan Huber, 2005 – Bali
- B. anhuiensis (Xu & Wang, 1984) – China
- B. aninaj Huber, 2005 – Thailand
- B. apo Huber, 2005 – Philippines
- B. australis Huber, 2001 – Indonesia (Moluccas), Australia (Northern Territory, Queensland)
- B. babensis Yao, Pham & Li, 2015 – Vietnam
- B. bachma Zhu & Li, 2021 – Vietnam
- B. badulla Huber, 2019 – Sri Lanka
- B. banlakwo Huber, 2005 – Thailand
- B. bantham Huber, 2005 – Thailand
- B. bawangensis Zhang & Peng, 2011 – China
- B. benjamini Huber, 2005 – Sri Lanka
- B. bohorok Huber, 2005 – Malaysia, Indonesia (Sumatra, Borneo)
- B. bubeng Zhu & Li, 2021 – China
- B. cas Yao & Li, 2018 – China
- B. champasakensis Yao & Li, 2013 – Laos
- B. chaoanensis Zhang & Peng, 2011 – China
- B. cheni Yao, Pham & Li, 2015 – Vietnam
- B. chenjini Yao & Li, 2018 – China
- B. clavata Yao, Pham & Li, 2015 – Vietnam
- B. coblynau Huber & Clark, 2023 – Australia
- B. colubrina Zhang & Peng, 2011 – China
- B. crystallina Yao & Li, 2013 – Laos
- B. cucphuong Zhu & Li, 2021 – Vietnam
- B. curva Yao, Pham & Li, 2015 – Vietnam
- B. daji Chen, Zhang & Zhu, 2009 – China
- B. davao Huber, 2005 – Philippines, Indonesia (Borneo)
- B. decora Yao, Pham & Li, 2015 – Vietnam
- B. denticulata Pham, 2015 – Vietnam
- B. desciscens Tong & Li, 2009 – China
- B. dian Yao & Li, 2018 – China
- B. diaoluoensis Zhang & Peng, 2011 – China
- B. dodabetta Huber, 2005 – India
- B. doloduo Huber, 2005 – Indonesia (Sulawesi)
- B. douqing Chen, Zhang & Zhu, 2009 – China
- B. erawan Huber, 2005 – Thailand
- B. erromena Zhang & Peng, 2011 – China
- B. exian Tong & Li, 2009 – China
- B. fiji Huber, 2005 – Fiji
- B. floreni Huber, 2005 – Borneo
- B. flores Huber, 2005 – Indonesia
- B. forcipata (Tu, 1994) – China
- B. fraser Huber, 2005 – Malaysia
- B. freyae Huber, 2005 – Indonesia (Sumatra)
- B. galeiformis Zhang & Peng, 2011 – China
- B. gedeh Huber, 2005 – Indonesia (Java)
- B. gigantea Yao & Li, 2013 – Laos
- B. gowindahela Huber, 2019 – Sri Lanka
- B. guilin Yao & Li, 2020 – China
- B. gupian Yao & Li, 2018 – China
- B. gyirong Zhang, Zhu & Song, 2006 – China
- B. halongensis Yao, Pham & Li, 2015 – Vietnam
- B. hormigai Huber, 2005 – Thailand
- B. huberi Tong & Li, 2008 – China
- B. inthanon Huber, 2005 – Thailand
- B. jaegeri Zhu & Li, 2021 – Malaysia (peninsula)
- B. jimi Huber, 2005 – New Guinea
- B. junkoae (Irie, 1997) – Taiwan, Japan
- B. kachin Zhu & Li, 2021 – Myanmar
- B. kaharian Huber, 2005 – Borneo
- B. kendari Huber, 2005 – Indonesia (Sulawesi)
- B. ketambe Huber, 2005 – Thailand, Indonesia (Sumatra)
- B. keyti Huber, 2005 – Sri Lanka
- B. khanensis Yao & Li, 2013 – Laos
- B. khaosok Huber, 2005 – Thailand
- B. khaoyai Huber, 2005 – Thailand
- B. khieo Huber, 2005 – Thailand
- B. kinabalu Huber, 2005 – Borneo
- B. lamellaris Tong & Li, 2008 – China
- B. lancea Yao & Li, 2013 – Laos
- B. lata Zhang & Peng, 2011 – China
- B. leclerci Huber, 2005 – Thailand
- B. leumas Huber, 2005 – Thailand
- B. leuser Huber, 2005 – Thailand, Malaysia, Indonesia (Sumatra, Borneo)
- B. lii Chen, Yu & Guo, 2016 – China
- B. limpida (Simon, 1909) – Vietnam
- B. longinqua Zhang & Peng, 2011 – China
- B. mainling Zhang, Zhu & Song, 2006 – China
- B. maoer Yao & Li, 2020 – China
- B. maogan Tong & Li, 2009 – China
- B. marena Huber, 2005 – Indonesia (Sulawesi)
- B. martensi Yao & Li, 2013 – Laos
- B. marusiki Huber, 2005 – India
- B. medog Yao & Li, 2020 – China
- B. menghai Yao & Li, 2019 – China
- B. mengla Yao & Li, 2020 – China
- B. menglun Yao & Li, 2020 – China
- B. mengyang Yao & Li, 2020 – China
- B. minneriya Huber, 2019 – Sri Lanka
- B. muruo Yao & Li, 2020 – China
- B. nahtanoj Huber, 2005 – Indonesia (Sulawesi)
- B. naling Yao & Li, 2020 – China
- B. nomis Huber, 2005 – Malaysia, Singapore
- B. nujiang Huber, 2005 – China
- B. parallelica Zhang & Peng, 2011 – China
- B. phungae Yao, Pham & Li, 2015 – Vietnam
- B. phurua Huber, 2005 – Thailand
- B. pianma Huber, 2005 – China
- B. pisinna Yao, Pham & Li, 2015 – Vietnam
- B. pranburi Huber, 2005 – Thailand
- B. protumida Yao, Li & Jäger, 2014 – Malaysia
- B. putao Yao & Li, 2020 – Myanmar
- B. ranong Huber, 2005 – Thailand
- B. ratnapura Huber, 2005 – Sri Lanka
- B. rollofoliolata (Wang, 1983) – China
- B. sabah Huber, 2005 – Borneo
- B. sandakan Huber, 2005 – Malaysia, Indonesia (Sumatra, Borneo)
- B. sarika Huber, 2005 – Thailand
- B. scharffi Huber, 2005 – Thailand
- B. schwendingeri Huber, 2005 – China, Thailand, Vietnam
- B. sepaku Huber, 2005 – Vietnam, Indonesia (Borneo)
- B. strinatii Huber, 2005 – Malaysia
- B. sumba Huber, 2005 – Indonesia
- B. tadetuensis Yao & Li, 2013 – Laos
- B. tambligan Huber, 2005 – Indonesia (Java, Bali)
- B. tarang Zhu & Li, 2021 – Indonesia (Sumatra)
- B. tauricornis Thorell, 1898 (type) – Myanmar
- B. tianlinensis Zhang & Peng, 2011 – China
- B. tongle Zhang, Chen & Zhu, 2008 – China
- B. triangula Yao, Pham & Li, 2015 – Vietnam
- B. vietnamensis Yao, Pham & Li, 2015 – Vietnam
- B. wau Huber, 2005 – New Guinea
- B. xiangensis Yao & Li, 2013 – Laos
- B. xiaolongha Zhu & Li, 2021 – China
- B. xigaze Zhu & Li, 2021 – China
- B. xishuangbanna Yao & Li, 2019 – China
- B. xishui Chen, Zhang & Zhu, 2009 – China
- B. xiyuan Yao & Li, 2020 – China
- B. xuanguan Yao & Li, 2020 – China
- B. yadongensis (Hu, 1985) – China
- B. yalong Tong & Li, 2009 – China
- B. yanbaruensis (Irie, 2002) – Japan
- B. yangi Zhang & Peng, 2011 – China
- B. yangxiaodongi Yao & Li, 2018 – China
- B. yanhe Chen, Zhang & Zhu, 2009 – China
- B. yap Huber, 2005 – Caroline Is.
- B. yuexiu Yao & Li, 2020 – China
- B. zham Yao & Li, 2020 – China
- B. zhangi Tong & Li, 2007 – China
- B. zhengi Yao, Pham & Li, 2015 – China, Vietnam

== See also ==
- List of Pholcidae species
