= Khorata =

Scientific classification
- Kingdom: Animalia
- Phylum: Arthropoda
- Subphylum: Chelicerata
- Class: Arachnida
- Order: Araneae
- Infraorder: Araneomorphae
- Family: Pholcidae
- Genus: Khorata; Huber, 2005

Type species
- K. khammouan Huber, 2005

Species
- 51, see text

Genus of spiders

Khorata is a genus of Asian cellar spiders that was first described by B. A. Huber in 2005.

== Species ==
As of August 2025, the genus includes 55 species:

- Khorata bachma Yao & Li, 2018 – Vietnam
- Khorata bangkok Huber, 2005 – Thailand, Laos
- Khorata bayeri Yao, Li & Jäger, 2014 – Thailand
- Khorata circularis Yao & Li, 2013 – Laos
- Khorata cucphuong Yao & Li, 2018 – Vietnam
- Khorata dangi Yao, Pham & Li, 2015 – Vietnam
- Khorata danxia Sheng & Xu, 2021 – China
- Khorata dawei Yao & Li, 2019 – China
- Khorata diaoluoshanensis Tong & Li, 2008 – China
- Khorata digitata Yao & Li, 2010 – China, Vietnam
- Khorata dongkou Yao & Li, 2010 – China
- Khorata dupla Yao & Li, 2013 – Laos
- Khorata epunctata Yao & Li, 2010 – China
- Khorata flabelliformis Yao & Li, 2010 – China
- Khorata fusui Zhang & Zhu, 2009 – China
- Khorata guiensis Yao & Li, 2010 – China
- Khorata huberi Yao, Pham & Li, 2015 – Vietnam
- Khorata jaegeri Huber, 2005 – Laos
- Khorata kep Lan, Jäger & Li, 2021 – Cambodia
- Khorata khammouan Huber, 2005 (type) – Laos
- Khorata libo Yao & Li, 2019 – China
- Khorata liuzhouensis Yao & Li, 2010 – China
- Khorata luojinensis Yao & Li, 2010 – China
- Khorata luoping Yao & Li, 2019 – China
- Khorata macilenta Yao & Li, 2010 – China
- Khorata matang Yao & Li, 2019 – China
- Khorata miaoshanensis Yao & Li, 2010 – China
- Khorata musee Lan & Li, 2021 – Thailand
- Khorata nani Xu, Zheng & Yao, 2020 – China
- Khorata nanningensis Yao & Li, 2010 – China
- Khorata ningming Zhang & Zhu, 2009 – China
- Khorata ningyuan Wei & Xu, 2014 – China
- Khorata ninhbinh Zhang, Li & Yao, 2024 - Vietnam
- Khorata palace Yao & Li, 2018 – Vietnam
- Khorata paquini Yao & Li, 2010 – China
- Khorata protumida Yao, Pham & Li, 2015 – Vietnam
- Khorata qian Yao & Li, 2019 – China
- Khorata quangbinh Yao & Li, 2018 – Vietnam
- Khorata robertmurphyi Yao & Li, 2010 – China
- Khorata rongshuiensis Yao & Li, 2010 – China
- Khorata sancai Wei & Xu, 2014 – China
- Khorata schwendingeri Huber, 2005 – Thailand, Laos
- Khorata shao Yao & Li, 2010 – China
- Khorata suwei Yao & Li, 2019 – China
- Khorata triangula Yao & Li, 2010 – China
- Khorata vinhphuc Yao & Li, 2018 – Vietnam
- Khorata wangae Yao & Li, 2010 – China
- Khorata wenshan Yao & Li, 2019 – China
- Khorata xingyi Chen, Zhang & Zhu, 2009 – China
- Khorata yangchun Yao & Li, 2019 – China
- Khorata yuhaoi Xu, Zheng & Yao, 2020 – China
- Khorata zhui Zhang & Zhang, 2008 – China
- Khorata qianlei – Li, Li & Yao, 2025 China
- Khorata qunzhen Yao & Liu, 2025

== See also ==
- List of Pholcidae species

== Recent taxonomic advances ==
In 2025, scientists from China described a new species of Khorata, named Khorata qianlei, discovered in Guangxi province. This brought the total number of known species in the genus to 54. In the same study, the researchers proposed dividing the genus into nine species groups, to better organize the diversity of forms observed within Khorata.

These groups were created based on the shape and arrangement of certain body parts involved in reproduction, which differ slightly between species. For example, some species have unique spines, hooks, or plates on their reproductive organs, which help distinguish them from others. This new classification helps scientists better understand the evolutionary relationships between species in Khorata and improves the tools for identifying them, which is important for studying biodiversity in Asia's forests and cave.
