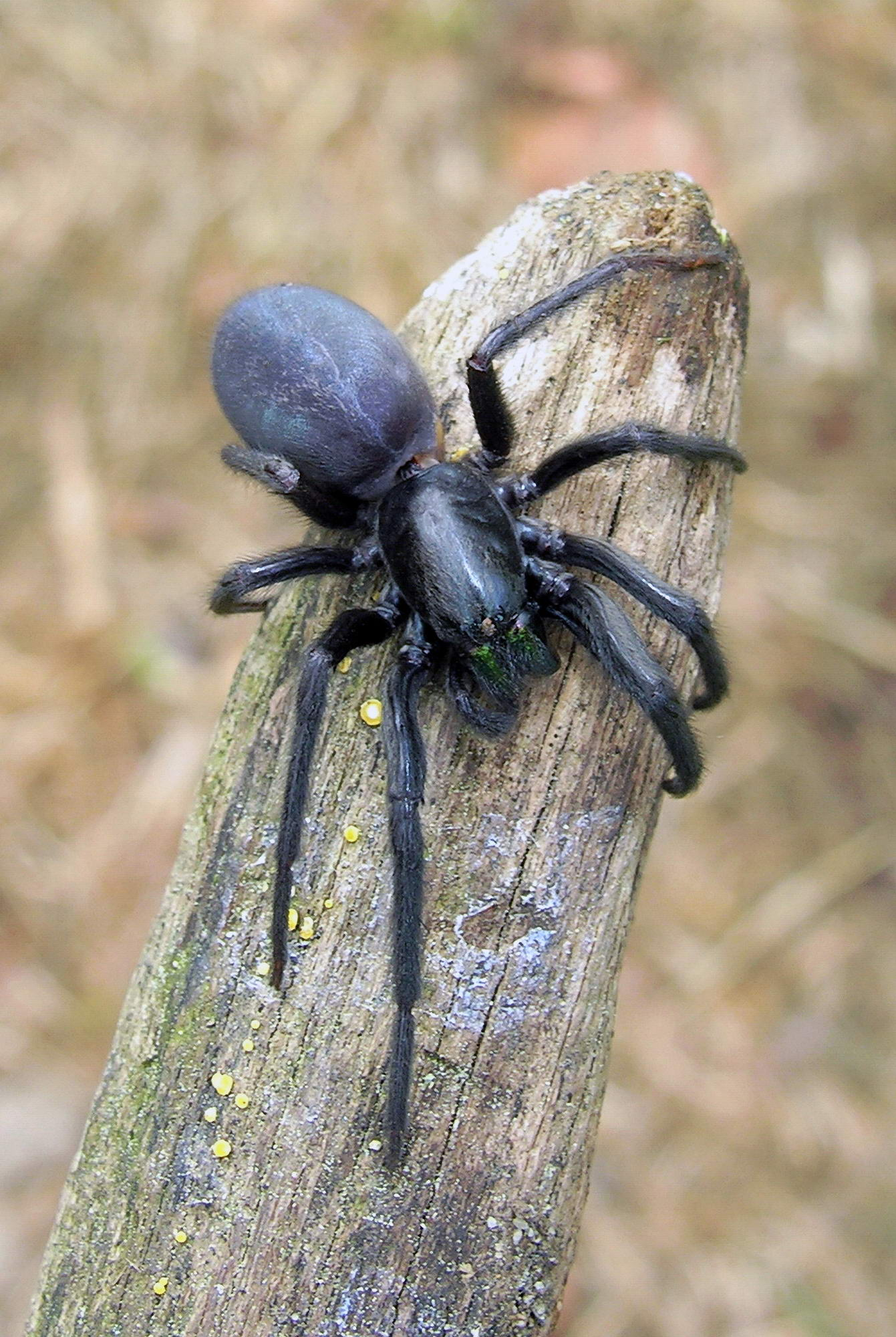
- Segestria florentina (Segestriidae)

Scientific classification
- Kingdom: Animalia
- Phylum: Arthropoda
- Subphylum: Chelicerata
- Class: Arachnida
- Order: Araneae
- Infraorder: Araneomorphae
- Superfamily: Dysderoidea

Families
- Dysderidae; Oonopidae; Orsolobidae; †Plumorsolidae; Segestriidae; ?Trogloraptoridae

Diversity
- 4 or 5 families

= Dysderoidea =

Dysderoidea Temporal range: Cretaceous–present

Superfamily of spiders

The Dysderoidea are a clade or superfamily of araneomorph spiders. The monophyly of the group, initially consisting of the four families Dysderidae, Oonopidae, Orsolobidae and Segestriidae, has consistently been recovered in phylogenetic studies. In 2014, a new family, Trogloraptoridae, was created for a recently discovered species Trogloraptor marchingtoni. It was suggested that Trogloraptoridae may be sister to the remaining members of the Dysderoidea clade. However, a later study found that Trogloraptoridae was placed outside the Dysderoidea and concluded that it was not part of this clade.

== Phylogeny ==
Dysderoidea are members of the Haplogynae clade: spiders with simpler copulatory organs (palpal bulbs and epigynes) than other araneomorphs. One hypothesis for relationships within the Haplogynae is shown below. The status of the Trogloraptoridae is unclear. The family was not included in one study which otherwise found the same topography, but it was placed outside even the Filistatidae in a 2014 study based on ribosomal DNA.

- Haplogynae
  - ?
    Trogloraptoridae
  - - Filistatidae
    - - remaining haplogynes
      - - Caponiidae
        - - Tetrablemmidae
          - Dysderoidea
            - ?
              Trogloraptoridae
            - - Segestriidae
              - - Dysderidae
                - - Oonopidae
                  - Orsolobidae

Other studies have suggested that Caponiidae rather than Tetrablemmidae are the sister of Dysderoidea.
