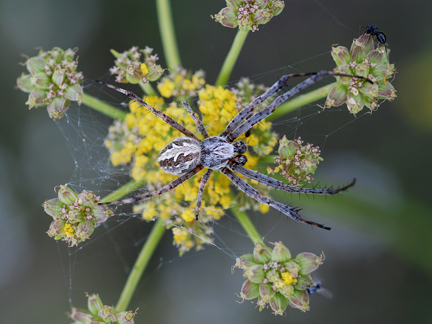

Scientific classification
- Kingdom: Animalia
- Phylum: Arthropoda
- Subphylum: Chelicerata
- Class: Arachnida
- Order: Araneae
- Infraorder: Araneomorphae
- Family: Diguetidae
- Genus: Diguetia
- Species: D. canities

Binomial name
- Diguetia canities (McCook, 1899)

Synonyms
- Segestria canities Digueta canities

= Diguetia canities =

Species of spider

Diguetia canities, commonly called the desert bush spider, is a species of coneweb spider found in desert and semidesert habitats in the United States from California eastward to Oklahoma and Texas.

This rather hairy spider has a body length of around 9 mm. The rather elongated cephalothorax is orange-brown and covered in short white hairs. The brown abdomen has dark, leaf-like markings bordered with white. The legs are yellow-brown. The sexes are generally similar. As with other members of this family, this spider constructs an elaborate and distinctive web with a domed sheet topped by a tubular retreat which has plant material incorporated. This retreat is used by the female spider to conceal its egg sac. The web is placed up to 60 cm above the ground, often in a bush (hence the common name).

The desert bush spider produces Dc1a, a potent insect-selective poisonous 57-residue peptide, which is lethal to the German cockroach (B. germanica).
