= Archaeoidea =

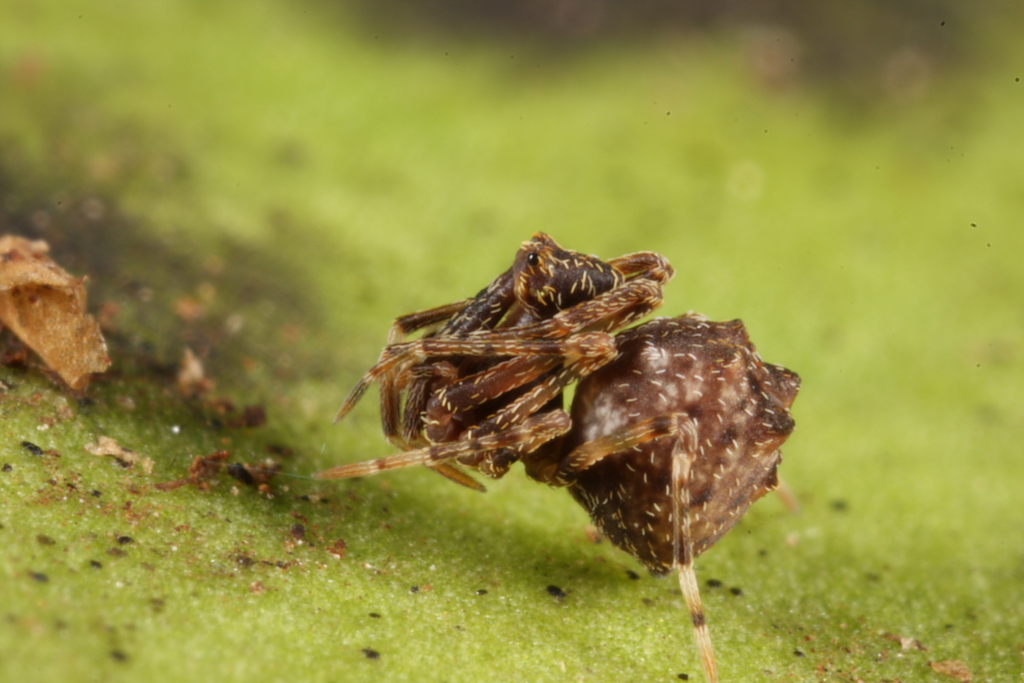
Austrarchaea, in Australia

The Archaeoidea or archaeoids are a group of araneomorph spiders, formerly treated as a superfamily. The unity of the group is rejected as of October 2015, with former members being placed in the Araneoidea and Palpimanoidea.

In 1984, Forster and Platnick reviewed spiders related to the archaeids. They created two new families, the Holarchaeidae and Pararchaeidae, which they grouped together with the Archaeidae and Mecysmaucheniidae, without giving them a formal name. One feature linking the four families is the way in which the front margin of the carapace is extended to encircle the base of the chelicerae. Forster and Platnick further suggested that all the "archaeid families" should be placed in the Palpimanoidea, rather than grouped with the araneoids as previously. Later phylogenetic studies have modified this proposal. The Archaeidae and Mecysmaucheniidae are retained in a more narrowly defined Palpimanoidea, the Holarchaeidae and Pararchaeidae being placed in Araneoidea.

Families that have been part of the defunct Archaeoidea are now placed as follows:

- Archaeidae → Palpimanoidea
- Holarchaeidae → Araneoidea
- Mecysmaucheniidae → Palpimanoidea
- Micropholcommatidae → Araneoidea
- Pararchaeidae → Araneoidea
