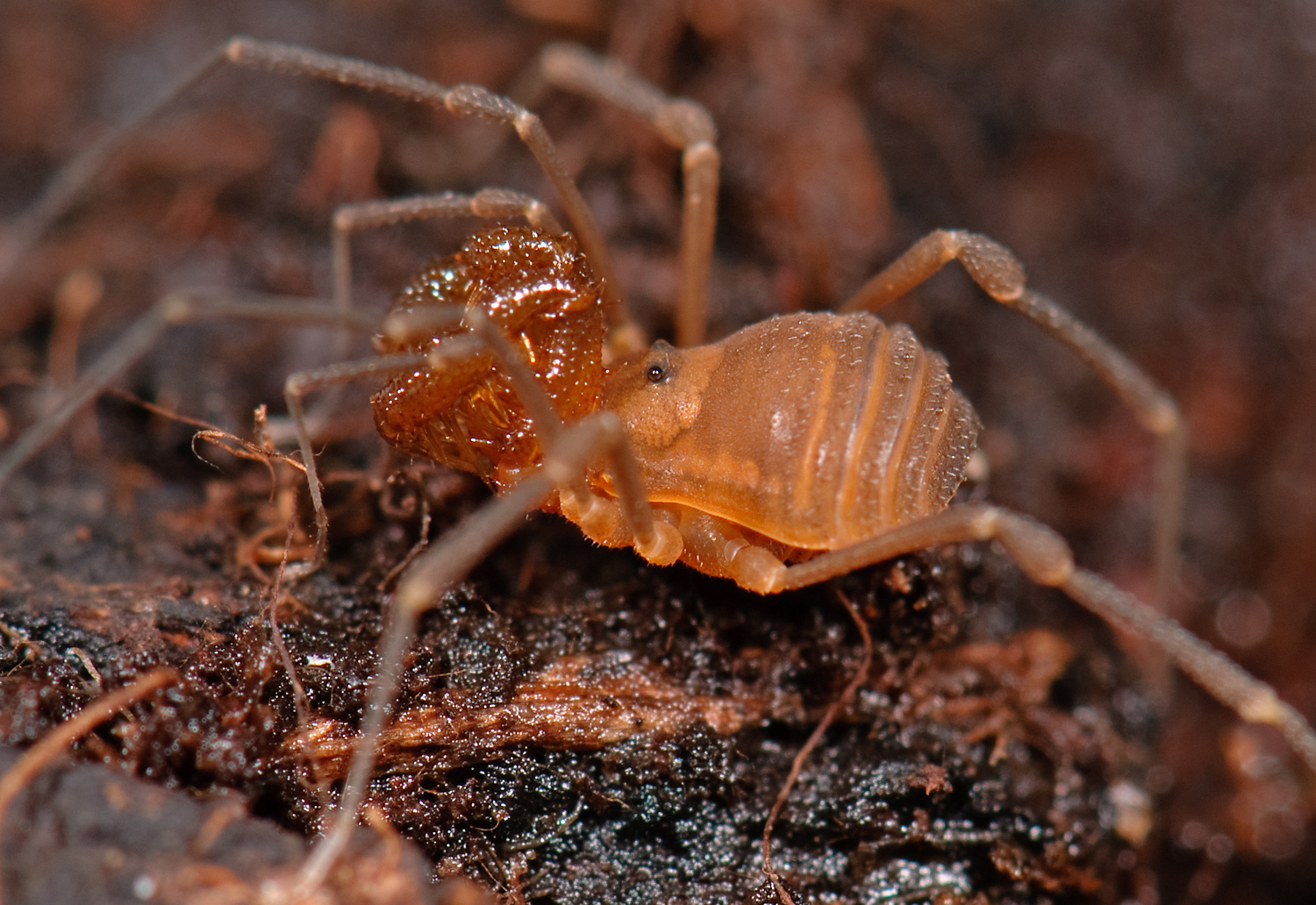
- Cryptomaster leviathan

Scientific classification
- Kingdom: Animalia
- Phylum: Arthropoda
- Subphylum: Chelicerata
- Class: Arachnida
- Order: Opiliones
- Infraorder: Insidiatores
- Superfamily: Travunioidea
- Family: Cryptomastridae; Derkarabetian & Hedin, 2018

= Cryptomastridae =

Family of harvestmen/daddy longlegs

Cryptomastridae is a family of armoured harvestmen in the order Opiliones. There are two genera and four described species in Cryptomastridae, found in Oregon and Idaho.

The members of Cryptomastridae were formerly members of the family Cladonychiidae.

== Genera ==
These two genera belong to the family Cryptomastridae:

- Cryptomaster Briggs, 1969
- Speleomaster Briggs, 1974
