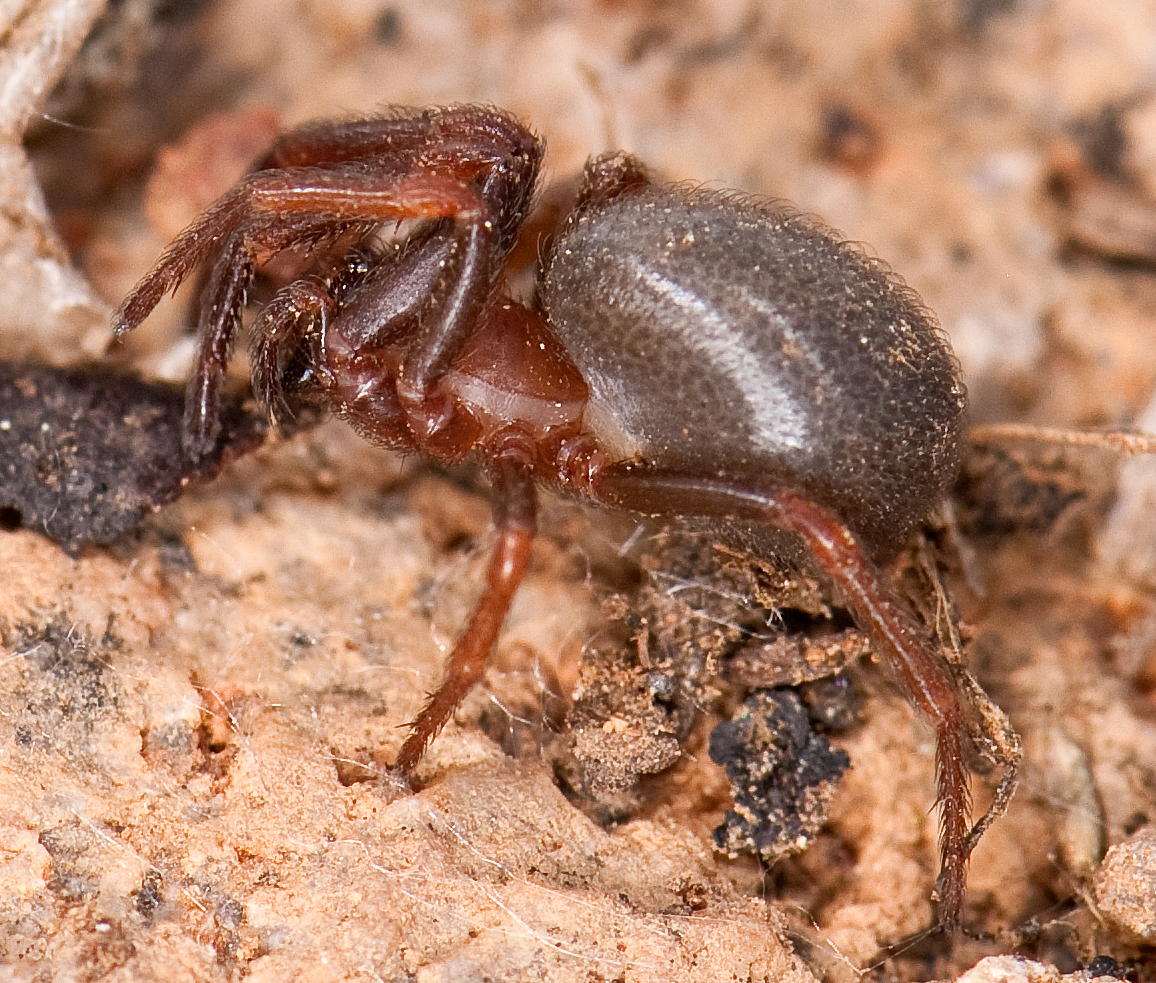
- P. castanea, female

Scientific classification
- Kingdom: Animalia
- Phylum: Arthropoda
- Subphylum: Chelicerata
- Class: Arachnida
- Order: Araneae
- Infraorder: Araneomorphae
- Family: Plectreuridae
- Genus: Plectreurys; Simon, 1893

Type species
- P. tristis Simon, 1893

Species
- 23, see text

= Plectreurys =

Plectreurys Temporal range: Neogene– Present

Genus of spiders

Plectreurys is a genus of plectreurid spiders that was first described by Eugène Louis Simon in 1893. It is one of only two genera in its family.

== Species ==
As of June 2019 it contains twenty-three species, found in Costa Rica, Guatemala, Mexico, the United States, and on the Greater Antilles:

- Plectreurys angela Gertsch, 1958 – USA
- Plectreurys ardea Gertsch, 1958 – Mexico
- Plectreurys arida Gertsch, 1958 – Mexico
- Plectreurys bicolor Banks, 1898 – Mexico
- Plectreurys castanea Simon, 1893 – USA
- Plectreurys ceralbona Chamberlin, 1924 – Mexico
- Plectreurys conifera Gertsch, 1958 – USA
- Plectreurys deserta Gertsch, 1958 – USA
- Plectreurys globosa Franganillo, 1931 – Cuba
- Plectreurys hatibonico Alayón, 2003 – Cuba
- Plectreurys janzeni Alayón & Víquez, 2011 – Guatemala to Costa Rica
- Plectreurys misteca Gertsch, 1958 – Mexico
- Plectreurys mojavea Gertsch, 1958 – USA
- Plectreurys monterea Gertsch, 1958 – USA
- Plectreurys nahuana Gertsch, 1958 – Mexico
- Plectreurys oasa Gertsch, 1958 – USA
- Plectreurys paisana Gertsch, 1958 – Mexico
- Plectreurys schicki Gertsch, 1958 – USA
- Plectreurys tecate Gertsch, 1958 – Mexico
- Plectreurys tristis Simon, 1893 (type) – USA, Mexico
- Plectreurys valens Chamberlin, 1924 – Mexico
- Plectreurys vaquera Gertsch, 1958 – Mexico
- Plectreurys zacateca Gertsch, 1958 – Mexico
