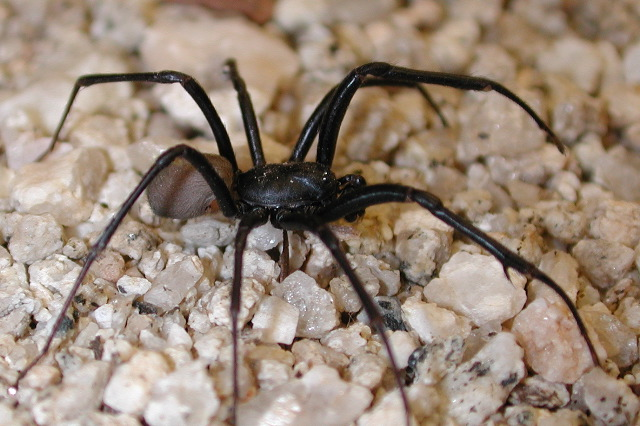
- Male plectreurid

Scientific classification
- Kingdom: Animalia
- Phylum: Arthropoda
- Subphylum: Chelicerata
- Class: Arachnida
- Order: Araneae
- Infraorder: Araneomorphae
- Family: Plectreuridae; Simon, 1893

Genera
- Kibramoa Chamberlin, 1924; Plectreurys Simon, 1893; †Eoplectreurys

Diversity
- 2 genera, 32 species
- blue: reported countries (WSC)

= Plectreuridae =

Plectreurid spiders Temporal range: Middle Jurassic - Holocene, 164–0 Ma

Family of spiders

Plectreuridae, also called plectreurid spiders, is a small spider family confined to the Southwestern United States, Mexico, and the Caribbean. Only two living genera are known—the nominate genus Plectreurys and Kibramoa.

In the past, the family was more widespread, with the Jurassic genus Eoplectreurys known from China, the Eocene Palaeoplectreurys baltica from Baltic amber and the Miocene Plectreurys pittfieldi from Dominican amber.

== Lifestyle ==
These ecribellate, haplogyne spiders build haphazard webs under rocks and dead cacti. Adult males can be found wandering at night. Relatively little is known of their biology.

== Description ==
Unlike the sicariids, scytodids, diguetids, and segestriids, to which they are most closely related, they have eight eyes.

In appearance, females of Plectreurys resemble those of the larger filistatids. They differ in their eye arrangement and in having the femurs on the first pair of legs bowed. Along with Filistatidae, they have the largest venom glands of all spiders relative to body size.

== Genera ==
As of January 2026, this family includes two genera and 32 species:

- Kibramoa Chamberlin, 1924 – Mexico, United States
- Plectreurys Simon, 1893 – Cuba, Mexico, United States

=== Extinct genera ===
- †Eoplectreurys Selden & Huang, 2010
- †Palaeoplectreurys Wunderlich, 2004
