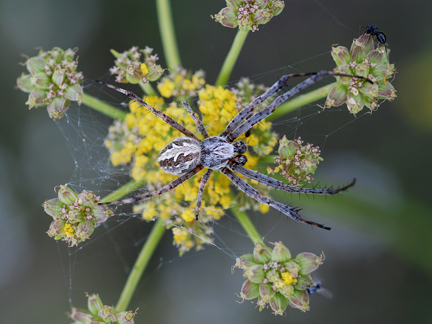
- Diguetia canities

Scientific classification
- Kingdom: Animalia
- Phylum: Arthropoda
- Subphylum: Chelicerata
- Class: Arachnida
- Order: Araneae
- Infraorder: Araneomorphae
- Family: Diguetidae; F. O. Pickard-Cambridge, 1899

Genera
- Diguetia Simon, 1895; Segestrioides Keyserling, 1883

Diversity
- 2 genera, 16 species
- blue: reported countries (WSC)

= Coneweb spider =

Coneweb spiders

Family of spiders

Coneweb spiders (Diguetidae) are six-eyed haplogyne spiders that live in tangled space webs, fashioning a cone-like central retreat where they hide and lay eggs. It is a small family, containing only two genera split between a range in the Southwestern United States and Mexico and a range in South America. Members of the genus Diguetia usually build their webs in shrubs or between cactus pads. They have the same eye arrangement as the venomous recluse spiders (family Sicariidae).

== Taxonomy ==
The group was first created by F. O. Pickard-Cambridge in 1899 as the subfamily Diguetiinae of the family Scytodidae. It was raised to the rank of family by Willis J. Gertsch using the spelling "Diguetidae". Pickard-Cambridge's use of double "i" is correct according to Article 29.3 of the International Code of Zoological Nomenclature, since the name is based on the genus Diguetia. In 2004, Jörg Wunderlich suggested reducing it again to a subfamily, this time of Plectreuridae. However, it is still sometimes considered a subfamily of the Plectreuridae.

== Genera ==
As of January 2026, this family includes two genera and sixteen species:

- Diguetia Simon, 1895 – Mexico, United States, Argentina
- Segestrioides Keyserling, 1883 – Brazil, Chile, Peru
