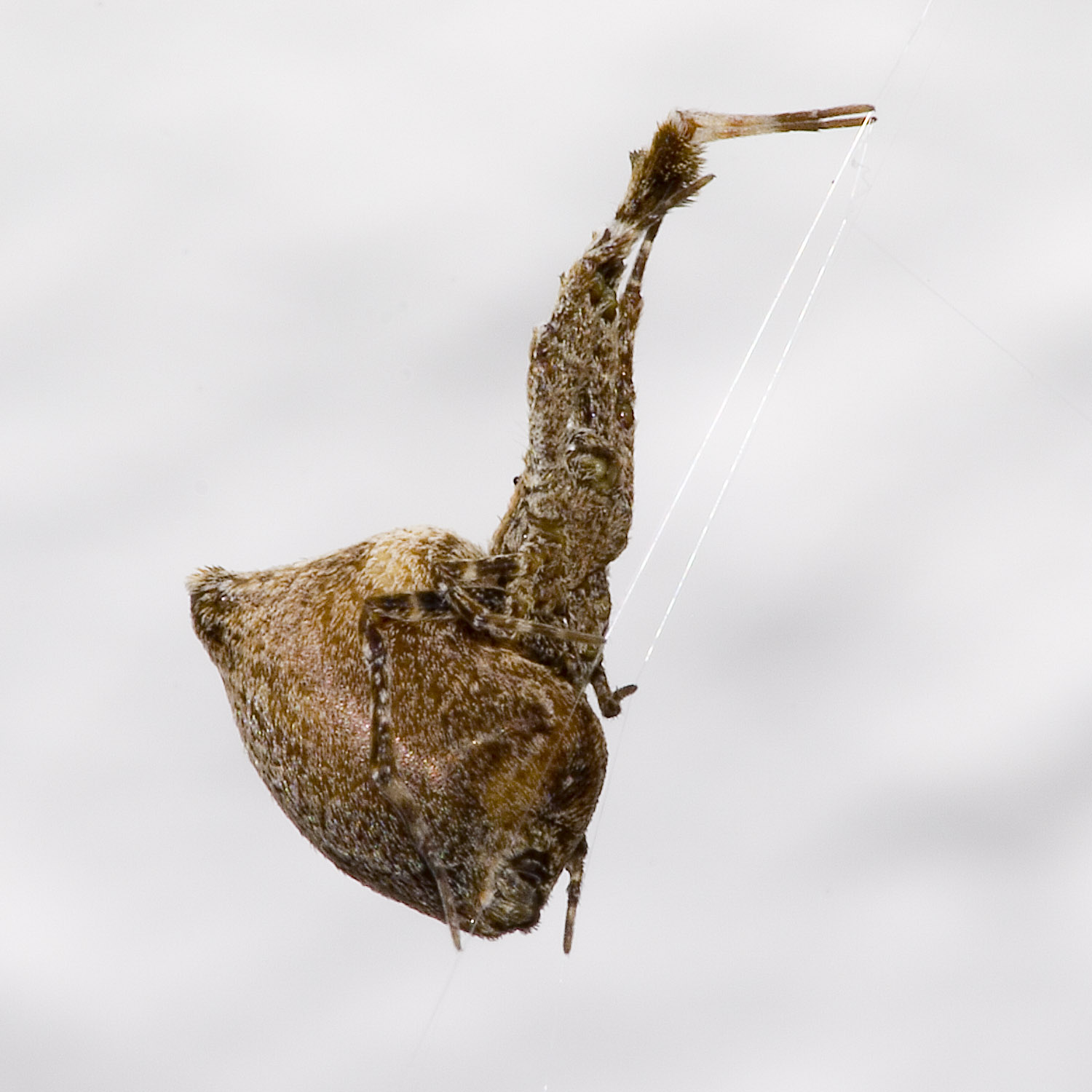
- Uloborus plumipes, Uloboridae
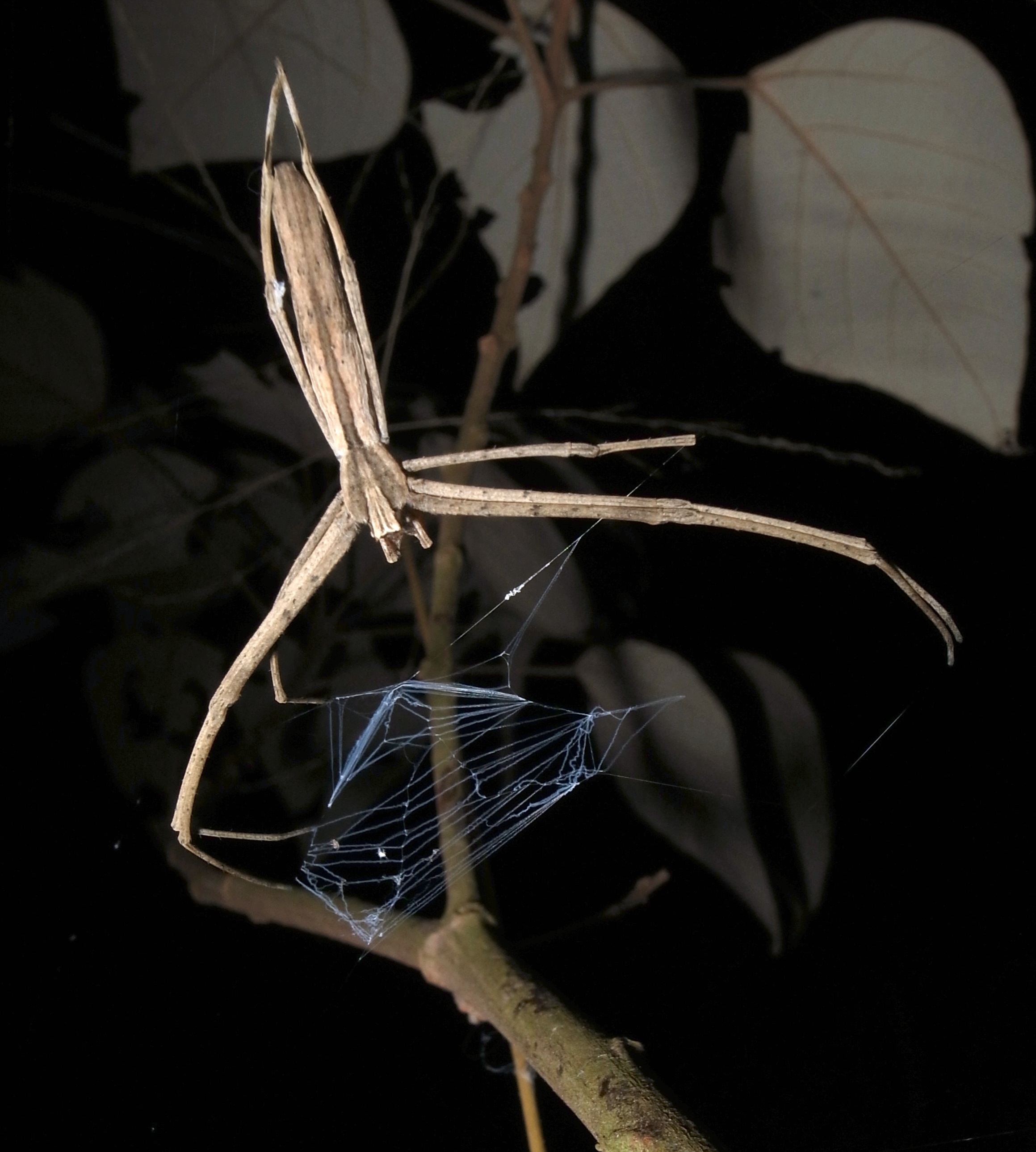
- Deinopis sp. with web

Scientific classification
- Kingdom: Animalia
- Phylum: Arthropoda
- Subphylum: Chelicerata
- Class: Arachnida
- Order: Araneae
- Infraorder: Araneomorphae
- Superfamily: Deinopoidea; C.L. Koch, 1851

Families
- Deinopidae; Uloboridae †Autotomianidae

= Deinopoidea =

Deinopoidea Temporal range: Jurassic–present

Superfamily of spiders

The Deinopoidea or deinopoids are group of cribellate araneomorph spiders that may be treated as a superfamily. As usually circumscribed, the group contains two extant families: Deinopidae and Uloboridae It also contains one extinct family, the Autotomianidae.

Some studies have produced cladograms in which the Deinopoidea are paraphyletic. A review in 2014 concluded that "at this time the monophyly of Deinopoidea remains dubious".

== Characteristics ==
The group is characterized by the production of orb webs with catching threads of cribellate silk (i.e. silk made up of very fine threads produced by combing an initial thread using the spider's calamistrum). Uloborids spin vertical orb webs, very similar in shape to those made by araneids, such as the cross spider. Deinopids initially spin an orb web, which they then suspend between their front legs and use as a net to ensnare prey.

== Phylogeny ==
According to one hypothesis, the two groups in which orb-weaving occurs, the cribellate deinopoids and the ecribellate araneoids, make up a single monophyletic group, Orbiculariae, in which orb-weaving evolved. One hypothesis for the relationships involved is summarized in the cladogram below.

- Entelegynae
  - Eresoidea
  - Palpimanoidea
  - - Orbiculariae
      - Deinopoidea
      - Araneoidea (broadly defined)
    - - Nicodamidae
      - RTA Clade

An alternative view is that both the Deinopoidea and the Orbiculariae are paraphyletic (i.e. do not form a good taxa). Another hypothesis for the phylogeny of the Entelegynae is shown below (parentheses show the genera included in the study).

- Entelegynae
  - Eresidae (Stegodyphus)
  - - Araneoidea
    - - - Uloboridae (Philoponella)
        - - Deinopidae (Deinopis)
          - Oecobiidae (Oecobius)
      - RTA Clade
