= Orbiculariae =

Potential clade of spiders

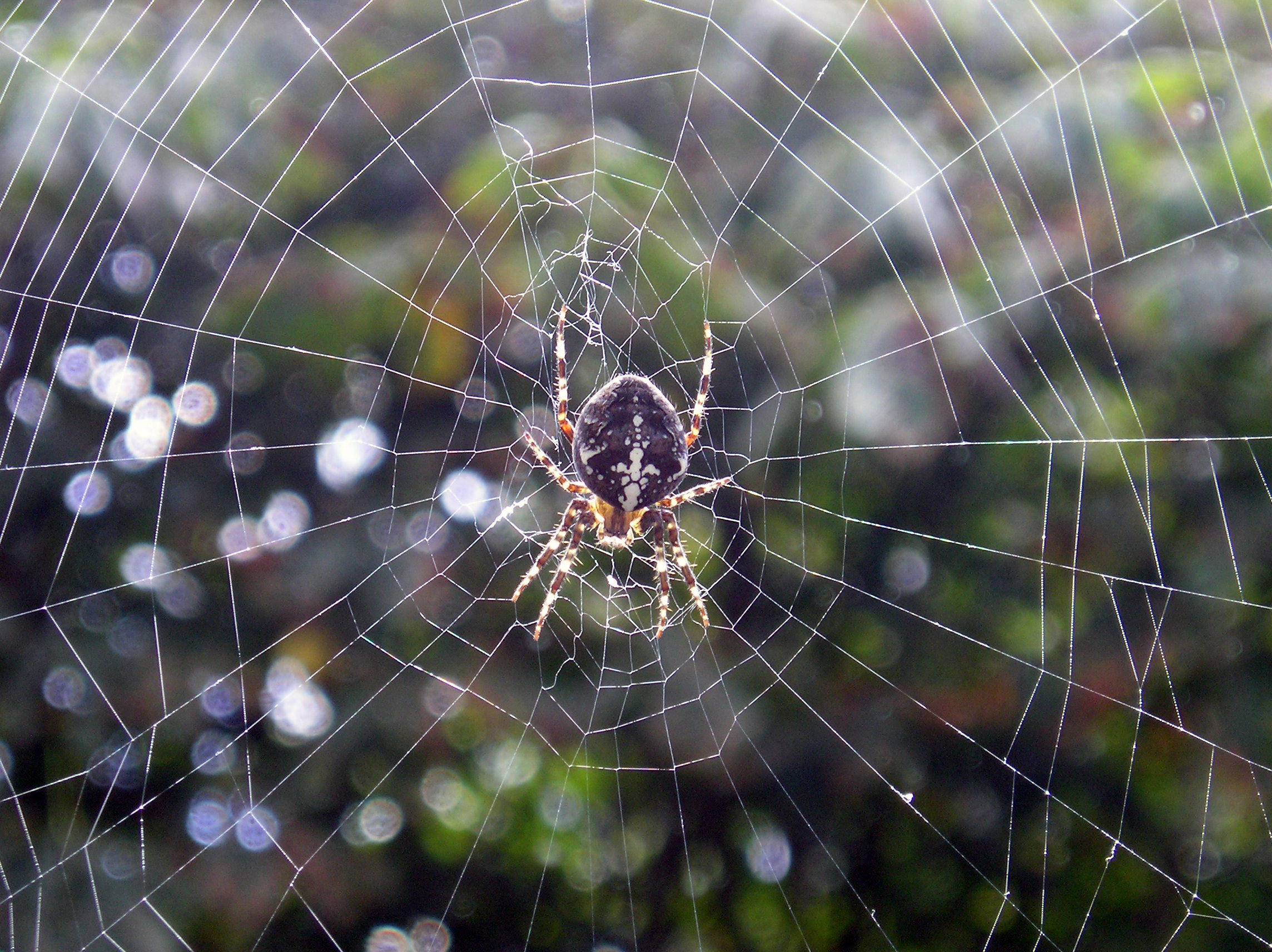
Araneus diadematus with web

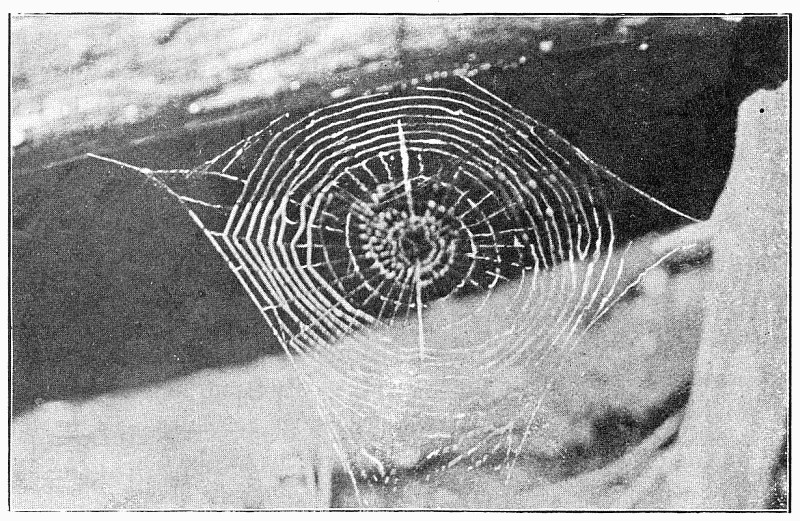
Uloborus web

Orbiculariae is a potential clade of araneomorph spiders, uniting two groups that make orb webs. Phylogenetic analyses based on morphological characters have generally recovered this clade; analyses based on DNA have regularly concluded that the group is not monophyletic. The issue relates to the origin of orb webs: whether they evolved early in the evolutionary history of entelegyne spiders, with many groups subsequently losing the ability to make orb webs, or whether they evolved later, with fewer groups having lost this ability. As of September 2018, the weight of the evidence strongly favours the non-monophyly of "Orbiculariae" and hence the early evolution of orb webs, followed by multiple changes and losses.

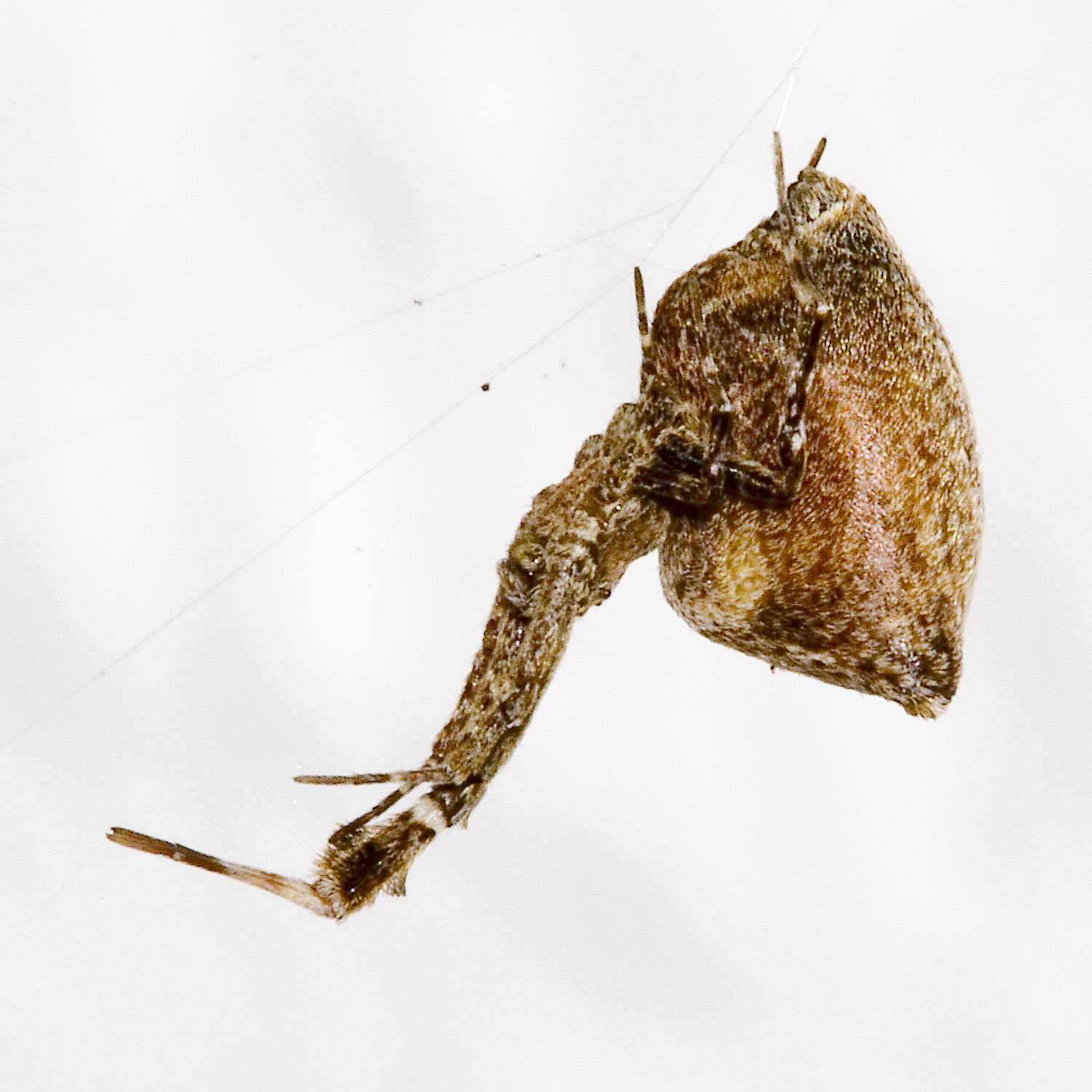
Uloborus plumipes

== History ==
Whether spiders that weave true orb webs form a coherent group, and so should be classified together, is a question that has a long history. Two groups of spiders that spin orb webs are the Uloboridae and the Araneidae. Although their webs have a very similar overall architecture, the sticky catching threads are created in different ways. Uloborid spiders have a cribellum – a flat plate from which a particular kind of silk emerges – and a calamistrum – a structure formed of bristles on the metatarsus of the fourth leg, used to "comb" the cribellate silk into extremely fine strands that are adhesive without having any "glue" present. Araneid spiders have silk-producing organs that add fine droplets of a glue-like substance to silk of normal thickness to create viscid silk. (Spiders that do not spin orb webs can also be divided into those that produce cribellate silk and those that produce viscid silk.)

Although cribellate and non-cribellate orb weavers had earlier been placed in the same taxon (from at least 1789), the two kinds of orb weaver were placed in separate taxa after the possession of a cribellum was prioritized over the form of the web. Following John Blackwall in 1841 and Philipp Bertkau in 1878, for a long time the majority of araneologists accepted spiders with a cribellum as a coherent taxon, Cribellatae. Many also held that cribellate and ecribellate spiders had separately evolved orb webs from other kinds of web. By the early 1970s, it had become apparent that cribellate spiders were a paraphyletic group, the cribellum being an ancient feature of araneomorph spiders that had been lost in many descendants, so that grouping spiders together based on the retention of this feature did not produce a monophyletic taxon.

This still leaves open questions relating to the origin of the orb web. Did it evolve only once, with araneids later losing the cribellum (and hence cribellate silk), or did it evolve separately in uloborids and araneids? If it evolved only once, how early did this happen in the evolutionary history of entelegyne spiders? If late, then uloborids and araneids may form a monophyletic group, Orbiculariae. If very early, then uloborids and ananeids may not be closely related, and many more araneoids that do not spin webs would have lost this ability secondarily.

== Modern phylogenetic studies ==
In 2014, Hormiga and Griswold reviewed the phylogeny of orb-weaving spiders, producing a summary based on what they considered to be the nine most comprehensive studies prior to their article. They concluded that there was limited evidence to group the cribellate Uloboridae and Deinopidae into a single taxon, Deinopoidea. (Deinopidae spin a small orb web, which they then cut loose and use as a net to catch prey.) There was strong evidence that a large group of ecribellate spiders formed the monophyletic Araneoidea. This taxon includes spiders that make orb webs, but also many that do not. At first, there was support for two hypotheses for the relationship between these two groups. Hormiga and Griswold suggested a cladogram similar to the preferred version of Blackledge et al. (2009):

- Entelegynae
  - Non-orb-weaving spiders (Eresoidea, RTA clade, etc.)
  - Orbiculariae
    - Deinopoidea (Deinopidae + Uloboridae)
    - - Nicodamidae
      - Araneoidea

This suggests that orb-weaving evolved relatively late in the entelegynes, and that many hunting spiders never had orb-weaving ancestors.

An alternative hypothesis, increasingly supported by molecular phylogenetic studies, is that the Orbiculariae are paraphyletic (i.e. do not form a good taxon). A 2016 hypothesis for the relationships of the relevant groups is shown below.

- - - Deinopidae
    - - Uloboridae
      - - Oecobiidae + Hersiliidae
        - RTA clade (non-orb-weaving spiders)
  - - Nicodamoidea
    - Araneoidea

On this view, the "Deinopoidea" are not monophyletic, and certainly do not form a clade with the Araneoidea. Orb webs evolved earlier, being present in the early entelegynes, and were then lost in more groups, making web evolution more convoluted, with different kinds of non-orb web having evolved separately more than once. Although some authors have said that current evidence does not allow a definitive choice between these two hypotheses, others consider that "the long-held paradigm of orbicularian monophyly" has been refuted. Further studies have supported this view, or taken it for granted.

== Bibliography ==
- Blackledge, Todd A.; Scharff, Nikolaj; Coddington, Jonathan A.; Szüts, Tamas; Wenzel, John W.; Hayashi, Cheryl Y. & Agnarsson, Ingi (2009), "Reconstructing web evolution and spider diversification in the molecular era", Proceedings of the National Academy of Sciences, 106 (13): 5229–5234, doi:10.1073/pnas.0901377106, PMC 2656561, PMID 19289848
- Bond, Jason E.; Garrison, Nicole L.; Hamilton, Chris A.; Godwin, Rebecca L.; Hedin, Marshal & Agnarsson, Ingi (2014), "Phylogenomics Resolves a Spider Backbone Phylogeny and Rejects a Prevailing Paradigm for Orb Web Evolution", Current Biology, 24 (15): 1765–1771, doi:10.1016/j.cub.2014.06.034, PMID 25042592
- Coddington, J.A. (1986), "The monophyletic origin of the orb web" (PDF), in Shear, W.A. (ed.), Spiders: Webs, Behavior, and Evolution, Stanford University Press, pp. 319–363, ISBN 978-0-8047-1203-3
- Dimitrov, Dimitar; Benavides, Ligia R.; Arnedo, Miquel A.; Giribet, Gonzalo; Griswold, Charles E.; Scharff, Nikolaj & Hormiga, Gustavo (2016), "Rounding up the usual suspects: a standard target-gene approach for resolving the interfamilial phylogenetic relationships of ecribellate orb-weaving spiders with a new family-rank classification (Araneae, Araneoidea)" (PDF), Cladistics, 33 (3): 221–250, doi:10.1111/cla.12165, PMID 34715728, S2CID 34962403
- Garrison, Nicole L.; Rodriguez, Juanita; Agnarsson, Ingi; Coddington, Jonathan A.; Griswold, Charles E.; Hamilton, Christopher A.; Hedin, Marshal; Kocot, Kevin M.; Ledford, Joel M. & Bond, Jason E. (2015), "Spider phylogenomics: untangling the Spider Tree of Life", PeerJ, 3: e1852, doi:10.7717/peerj.1719, PMC 4768681, PMID 26925338
- Hausdorf, B. (1999), "Molecular phylogeny of araneomorph spiders", Journal of Evolutionary Biology, 12 (5): 980–985, doi:10.1046/j.1420-9101.1999.00104.x, S2CID 86701506*
- Hormiga, Gustavo & Griswold, Charles E. (2014), "Systematics, Phylogeny, and Evolution of Orb-Weaving Spiders", Annual Review of Entomology, 59 (1): 487–512, doi:10.1146/annurev-ento-011613-162046, PMID 24160416
- Wheeler, Ward C.; Coddington, Jonathan A.; Crowley, Louise M.; Dimitrov, Dimitar; Goloboff, Pablo A.; Griswold, Charles E.; Hormiga, Gustavo; Prendini, Lorenzo; Ramírez, Martín J.; Sierwald, Petra; Almeida-Silva, Lina; Alvarez-Padilla, Fernando; Arnedo, Miquel A.; Benavides Silva, Ligia R.; Benjamin, Suresh P.; Bond, Jason E.; Grismado, Cristian J.; Hasan, Emile; Hedin, Marshal; Izquierdo, Matías A.; Labarque, Facundo M.; Ledford, Joel; Lopardo, Lara; Maddison, Wayne P.; Miller, Jeremy A.; Piacentini, Luis N.; Platnick, Norman I.; Polotow, Daniele; Silva-Dávila, Diana; Scharff, Nikolaj; Szűts, Tamás; Ubick, Darrell; Vink, Cor J.; Wood, Hannah M. & Zhang, Junxia (2017) [published online 2016], "The spider tree of life: phylogeny of Araneae based on target-gene analyses from an extensive taxon sampling", Cladistics, 33 (6): 574–616, doi:10.1111/cla.12182, S2CID 35535038
