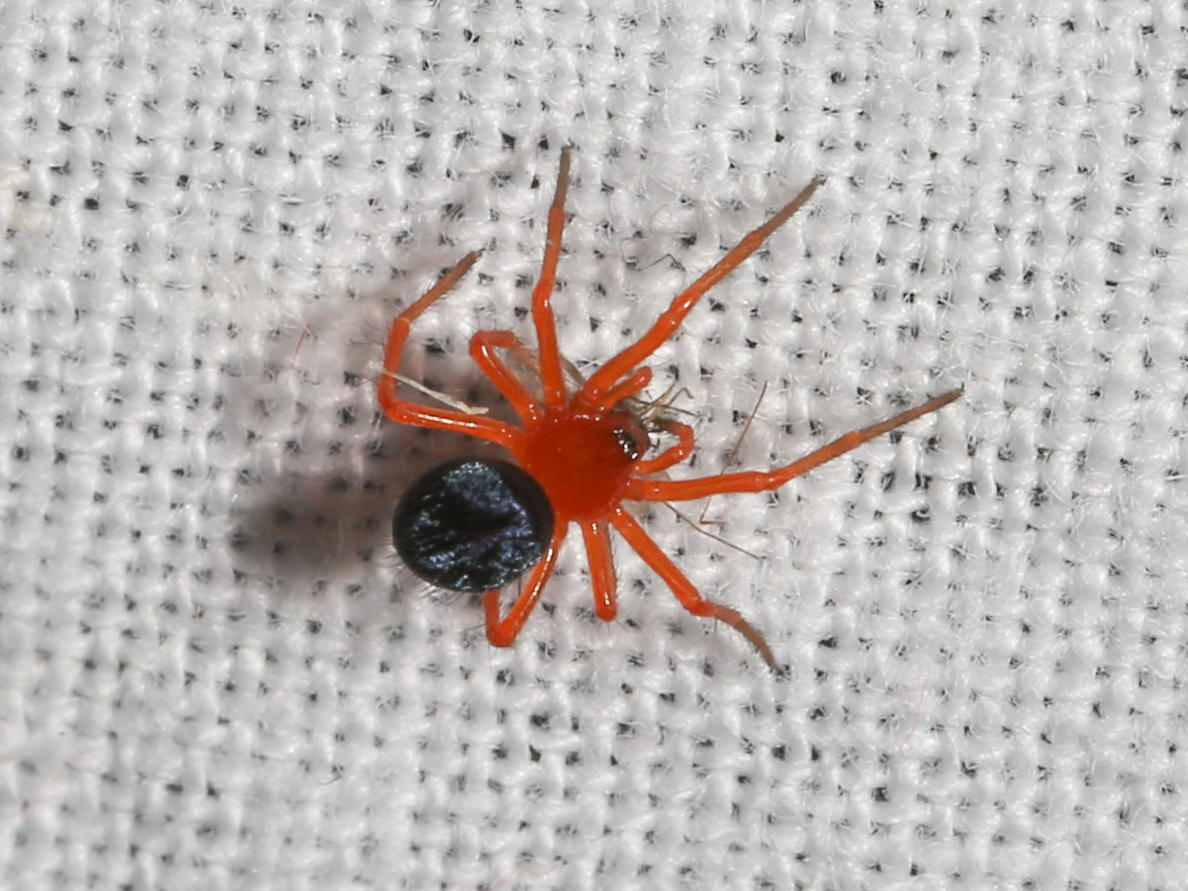
- In Murramarang National Park, Australia

Scientific classification
- Kingdom: Animalia
- Phylum: Arthropoda
- Subphylum: Chelicerata
- Class: Arachnida
- Order: Araneae
- Infraorder: Araneomorphae
- Family: Nicodamidae
- Genus: Nicodamus
- Species: N. peregrinus

Binomial name
- Nicodamus peregrinus Walckenaer, 1841

Synonyms
- Theridion peregrinum Walckenaer; Centropelma bicolor L. Koch; Centropelma peregrina Keyserling; Nicodamus bicolor Hickman; Ozaleus tarandus Thorell; Theridium semiflavum L.Koch

= Nicodamus peregrinus =

Red and black spider

Species of spider

Nicodamus peregrinus, known as the red and black spider, is a spider found in eastern and southern Australia. Unlike the redback spider (Latrodectus hasseltii), the bright red colouration does not appear to warn of significant danger to humans. Food is a variety of small insects. They have been recorded in Queensland, New South Wales, Victoria and South Australia.

== Description and egg sac ==
Usually found under bark, fallen trees or stones close to the ground. Legs are red and black. The cephalothorax is red, the abdomen is black or sometimes a dark blue. Palps are red and black. Body length of males is 8 to 10 mm, females 12 to 14 mm. The egg sac is 10 to 20 mm in diameter and contains from 30 to 50 cream eggs, 1 mm in diameter. The sac is plano-convex in shape, consisting of white fluffy silk, placed in a sheltered area such as under bark. Near continual courtship and mating have been observed when in captivity, resulting in the exhaustive death of the males. These spiders tend to wave their forelegs in the air while walking, and the males tap the ground with their palps.

== Taxonomy ==
This spider belongs to the family Nicodamidae. However, it has also been placed in the families Theridiidae, Agelenidae and Zodariidae. It was originally named by the French arachnologist Charles Walckenaer as Theridion peregrinum in 1841. However, there have been several name changes and synonymisations. The most recent being in 1995, after a revision of the family Nicodamidae, when the name Centropelma bicolor was synonymised with Nicodamus peregrinus. Walckenaer's original specific epithet peregrinum refers to the wandering nature of the spider.
