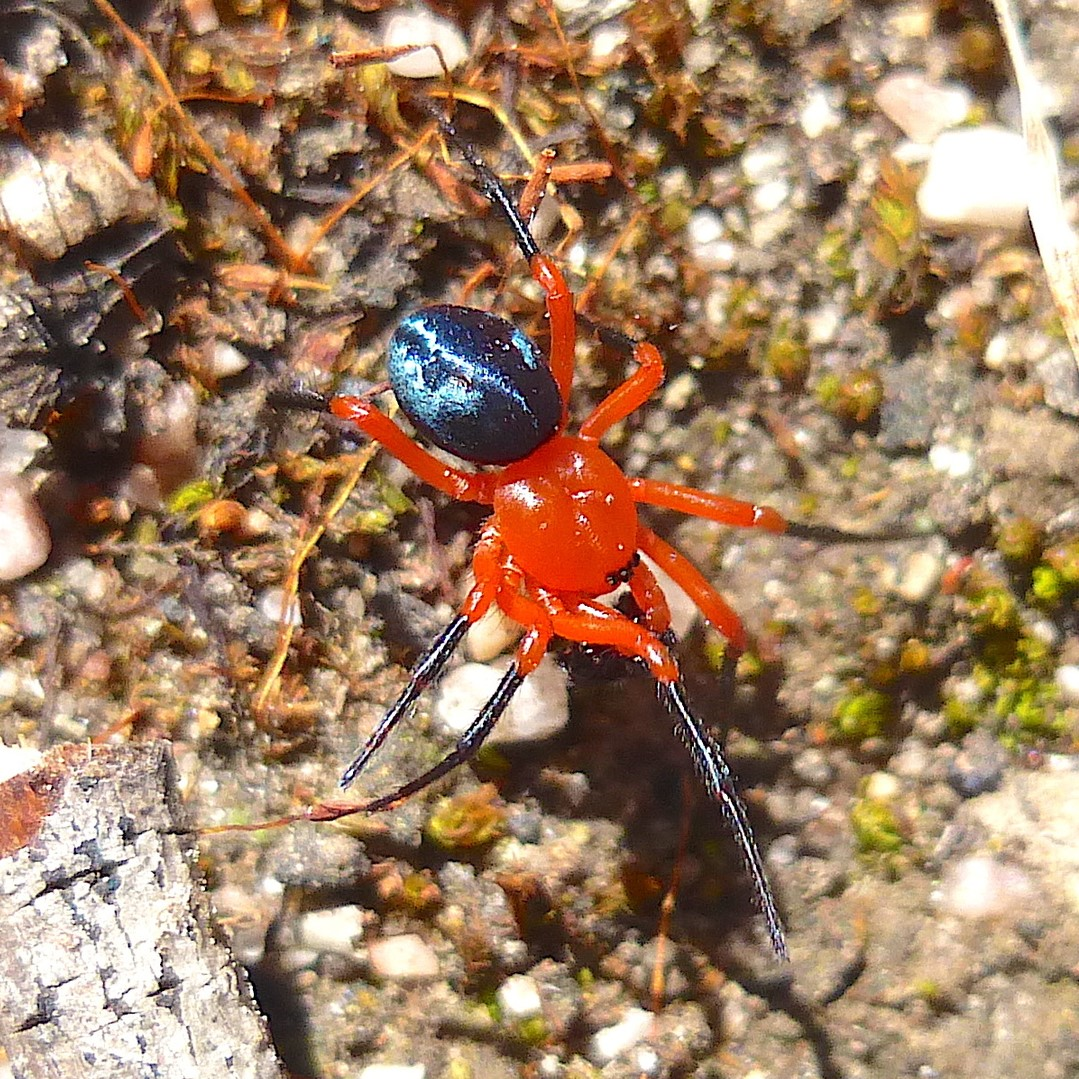
- Ambicodamus crinitus

Scientific classification
- Domain: Eukaryota
- Kingdom: Animalia
- Phylum: Arthropoda
- Subphylum: Chelicerata
- Class: Arachnida
- Order: Araneae
- Infraorder: Araneomorphae
- Family: Nicodamidae
- Genus: Ambicodamus; Harvey

Type species
- Ambicodamus marae Harvey, 1995

Species
- 11, see text

= Ambicodamus =

Genus of spiders

Ambicodamus is a genus of spiders in the family Nicodamidae. It was first described in 1995 by Mark Harvey. As of 2024, it contains 11 species, all from Australia.

== Species ==
Ambicodamus comprises the following species:

- Ambicodamus audax Harvey, 1995
- Ambicodamus crinitus (L. Koch, 1872)
- Ambicodamus dale Harvey, 1995
- Ambicodamus darlingtoni Harvey, 1995
- Ambicodamus emu Harvey, 1995
- Ambicodamus kochi Harvey, 1995
- Ambicodamus leei Harvey, 1995
- Ambicodamus marae Harvey, 1995
- Ambicodamus sororius Harvey, 1995
- Ambicodamus southwelli Harvey, 1995
- Ambicodamus urbanus Harvey, 1995
