= Oncodamus =

Scientific classification
- Domain: Eukaryota
- Kingdom: Animalia
- Phylum: Arthropoda
- Subphylum: Chelicerata
- Class: Arachnida
- Order: Araneae
- Infraorder: Araneomorphae
- Family: Nicodamidae
- Genus: Oncodamus; Harvey

Species
- Oncodamus bidens (Karsch, 1878); Oncodamus decipiens Harvey, 1995

Genus of spiders

Oncodamus is a genus of spiders in the family Nicodamidae. It was first described in 1995 by Mark Harvey. As of 2024, it contains 2 Australian species.
