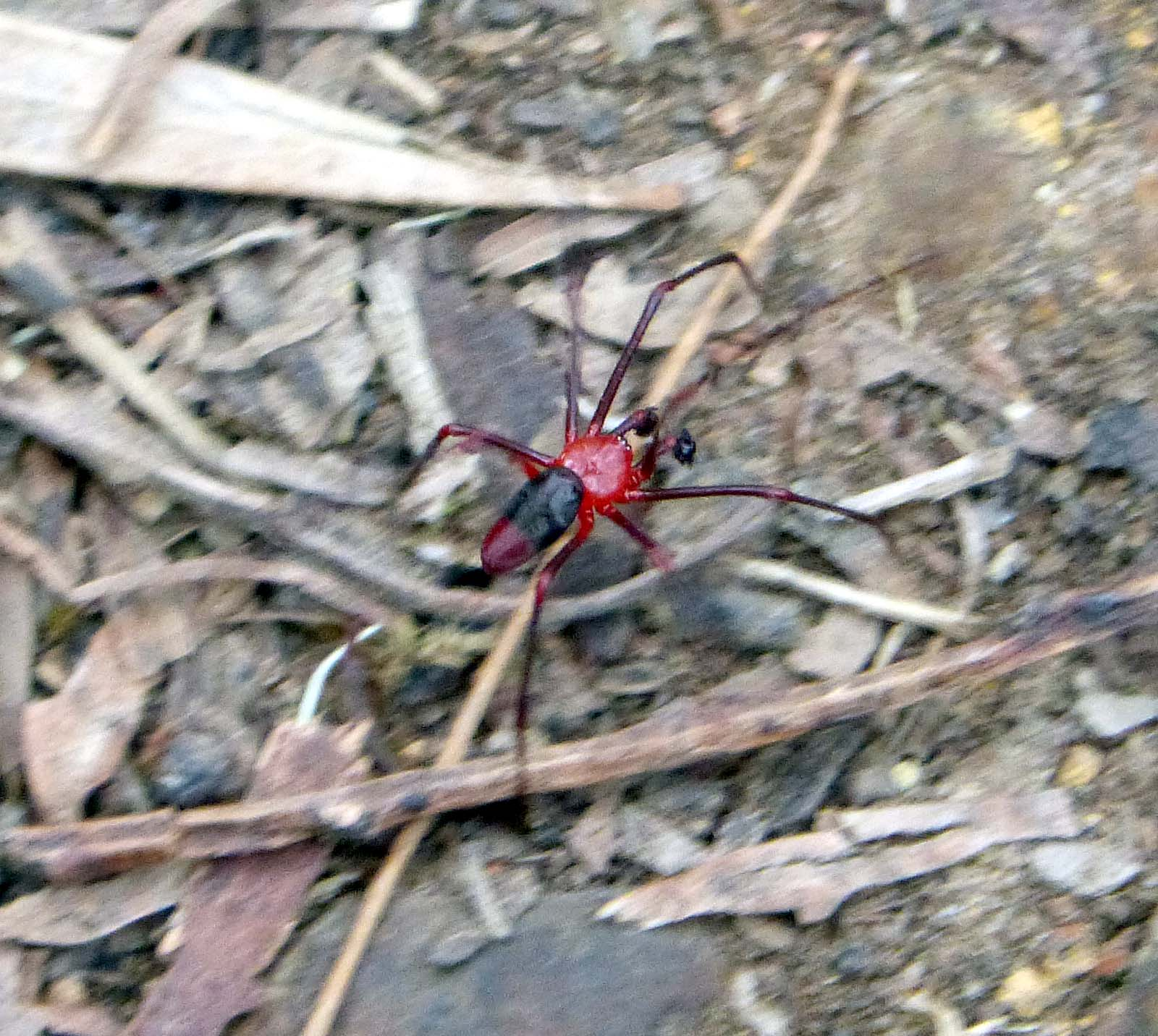
- Dimidamus dimidiatus

Scientific classification
- Kingdom: Animalia
- Phylum: Arthropoda
- Subphylum: Chelicerata
- Class: Arachnida
- Order: Araneae
- Infraorder: Araneomorphae
- Family: Nicodamidae
- Genus: Dimidamus; Harvey

Type species
- Dimidamus dimidiatus

Species
- 6, see text

= Dimidamus =

Genus of spiders

Dimidamus is a genus of spiders in the family Nicodamidae, with six species from New Guinea and Australia. It was first described in 1995.

== Species ==
As of January 2026, this genus includes six species:

- Dimidamus arau Harvey, 1995 - New Guinea
- Dimidamus dimidiatus (Simon, 1897) - Australia (Queensland, New South Wales)
- Dimidamus enaro Harvey, 1995 - New Guinea
- Dimidamus leopoldi (Roewer, 1938) - New Guinea
- Dimidamus sero Harvey, 1995 - New Guinea
- Dimidamus simoni Harvey, 1995 - Australia (Victoria)
