= Forstertyna =

Conservation status
- Data Deficit (NZ TCS)

Scientific classification
- Kingdom: Animalia
- Phylum: Arthropoda
- Subphylum: Chelicerata
- Class: Arachnida
- Order: Araneae
- Infraorder: Araneomorphae
- Family: Megadictynidae
- Genus: Forstertyna
- Species: F. marplesi

Binomial name
- Forstertyna marplesi (Forster, 1970)

Synonyms
- Megadictyna marplesi

Genus of spiders

Forstertyna is a genus of spiders in the family Megadictynidae. It was first described in 1995 by Harvey. As of 2017, it contains only one species, Forstertyna marplesi, from New Zealand.

== Taxonomy ==
This genus was first described in 1995 by Mark Harvey. However, the species was first described by Ray Forster in 1970 from female and male specimens. The holotype is stored in Otago Museum.

== Description ==
The female is recorded at 8.51mm in length whereas the male is 10.37mm. The female is coloured yellowish brown and has dark shading dorsally. The legs have dark brown bands. The abdomen is creamy and mottled black.

== Distribution ==
This species is only known from the southern end of New Zealand's South Island.

== Conservation status ==
Under the New Zealand Threat Classification System, this species is listed as "Data Deficient" with the qualifiers of "Data Poor: Size" and "Data Poor: Trend".
