= Novodamus =

Scientific classification
- Domain: Eukaryota
- Kingdom: Animalia
- Phylum: Arthropoda
- Subphylum: Chelicerata
- Class: Arachnida
- Order: Araneae
- Infraorder: Araneomorphae
- Family: Nicodamidae
- Genus: Novodamus; Harvey, 1995

Type species
- N. nodatus (Karsch, 1878)

Species
- N. nodatus (Karsch, 1878) — Australia (New South Wales, Victoria, Tasmania); N. supernus Harvey, 1995 — Australia (New South Wales)

Genus of spiders

Novodamus is a genus of Australian cribellate spiders first described by Mark Stephen Harvey in 1995. As of November 2024 it contains only two species.
