= Durodamus =

Scientific classification
- Domain: Eukaryota
- Kingdom: Animalia
- Phylum: Arthropoda
- Subphylum: Chelicerata
- Class: Arachnida
- Order: Araneae
- Infraorder: Araneomorphae
- Family: Nicodamidae
- Genus: Durodamus
- Species: D. yeni

Binomial name
- Durodamus yeni Harvey, 1995

Genus of spiders

Durodamus is a monotypic genus of spiders in the family Nicodamidae. It was first described in 1995. As of 2024, it contains only one species, Durodamus yeni, found in Queensland, Victoria, and South Australia.
