= Nicodamus =

Scientific classification
- Kingdom: Animalia
- Phylum: Arthropoda
- Subphylum: Chelicerata
- Class: Arachnida
- Order: Araneae
- Infraorder: Araneomorphae
- Family: Nicodamidae
- Genus: Nicodamus; Simon, 1887

Genus of spiders

Nicodamus is a genus of small spiders known from Australia. They are often referred to as the red and black spiders. As of 2017 its two species include Nicodamus peregrinus and Nicodamus mainae.
