= Eresoidea =

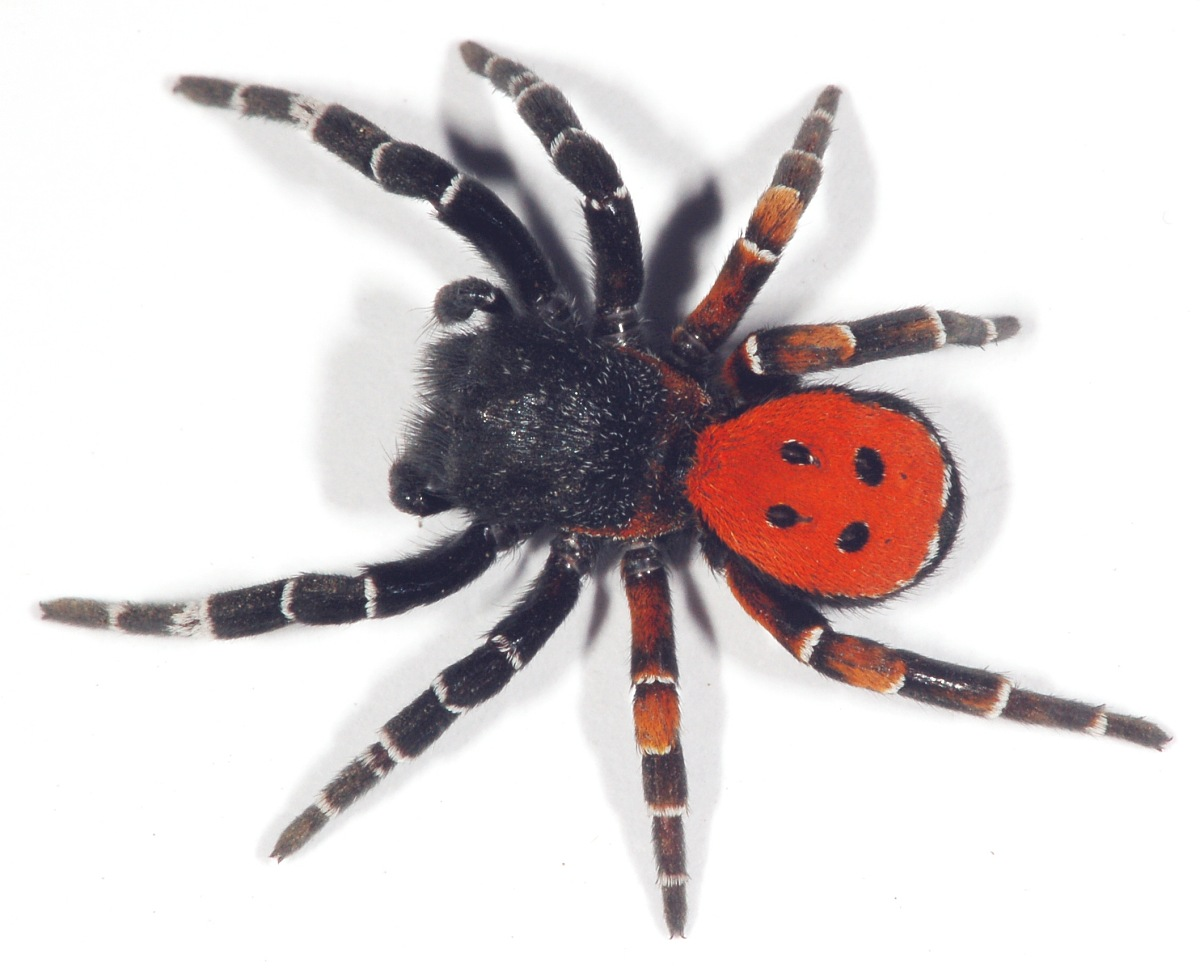
Male Eresus kollari

The Eresoidea or eresoids are a group of araneomorph spiders that have been treated as a superfamily. As usually circumscribed, the group contains three families: Eresidae, Hersiliidae and Oecobiidae. Studies and reviews based on morphology suggested the monophyly of the group; more recent gene-based studies have found the Eresidae and Oecobiidae to fall into different clades, placing doubt on the acceptability of the taxon. Some researchers have grouped Hersiliidae and Oecobiidae into the separate superfamily Oecobioidea, a conclusion supported in a 2017 study, which does not support Eresoidea.

== Phylogeny ==
Some largely morphology-based phylogenetic studies that included the three families assigned to the Eresoidea supported their monophyly, with the internal structure of the clade being as shown below.

- - Eresidae
  - - Oecobiidae
    - Hersiliidae

Eresoidea was placed as basal in the Entelegynae, with its precise position relative to the Palpimanoidea, also basal, varying. In 2015, Jonathan A. Coddington summarized this as a trichotomy:

- Entelegynae
  - Eresoidea
  - Palpimanoidea
  - "canoe tapetum clade" holding the remaining entelegynes

Another summary phylogeny groups Eresoidea and Palpimanoidea into a single clade, sister to the "canoe tapetum clade" holding the remaining entelegynes.

Other studies, particularly those using genetic data, have presented different views. A 2010 study of the phylogeny of entelegyne spiders separated Eresidae from Oecobiidae and Hersiliidae, placing the latter two in a superfamily Oecobioidea. In 2014, a cladogram was presented in which Eresoidea is similarly paraphyletic (shading marks Eresoidea families):

- Entelegynae
  - Palpimanoidea
  - - Eresidae
    - - - RTA clade
        - - Hersiliidae
          - Oecobiidae
      - Orbiculariae

A 2014 study based on a larger portion of the spider genome than any previous study also separates the Eresidae and the Oecobiidae (Hersiliidae was not included) (eresoid families are again shaded):

- Entelegynae
  - Eresidae (Stegodyphus)
  - - Araneoidea
    - - - Uloboridae (Philoponella)
        - - Deinopidae (Deinopis)
          - Oecobiidae (Oecobius)
      - RTA Clade

A 2017 study also did not support Eresoidea, agreeing with earlier studies in placing Eresidae away from Hersiliidae and Oecobiidae, which were grouped as Oecobioidae.
