= Litodamus =

Scientific classification
- Domain: Eukaryota
- Kingdom: Animalia
- Phylum: Arthropoda
- Subphylum: Chelicerata
- Class: Arachnida
- Order: Araneae
- Infraorder: Araneomorphae
- Family: Nicodamidae
- Genus: Litodamus; Harvey

Species
- Litodamus collinus Harvey, 1995; Litodamus hickmani Harvey, 1995; Litodamus olga Harvey, 1995

Genus of spiders

Litodamus is a genus of spiders in the family Nicodamidae. It was first described in 1995 by Mark Harvey. As of 2024, it contains 3 species, all from Tasmania.
