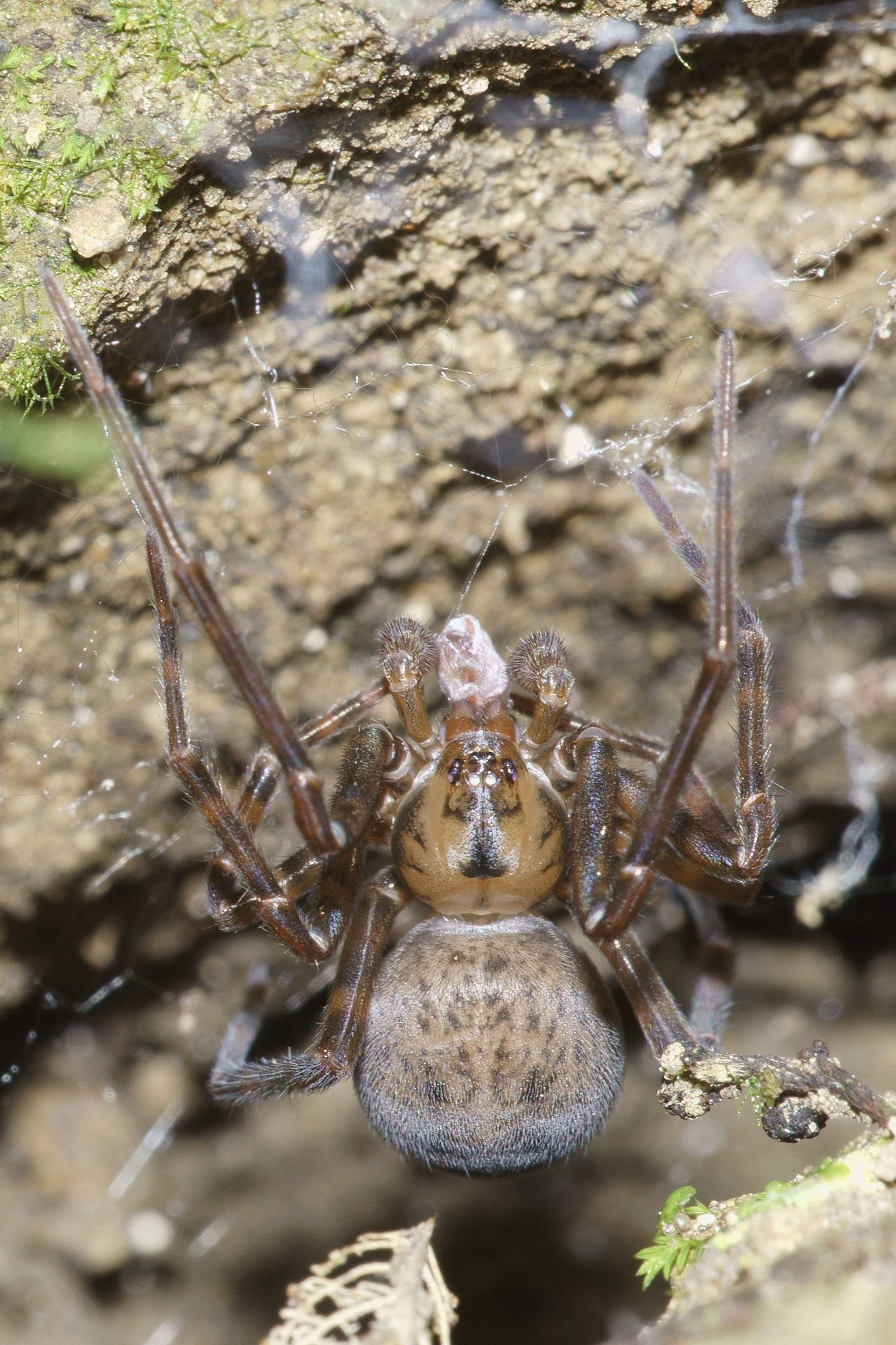
- female Megadictyna thilenii
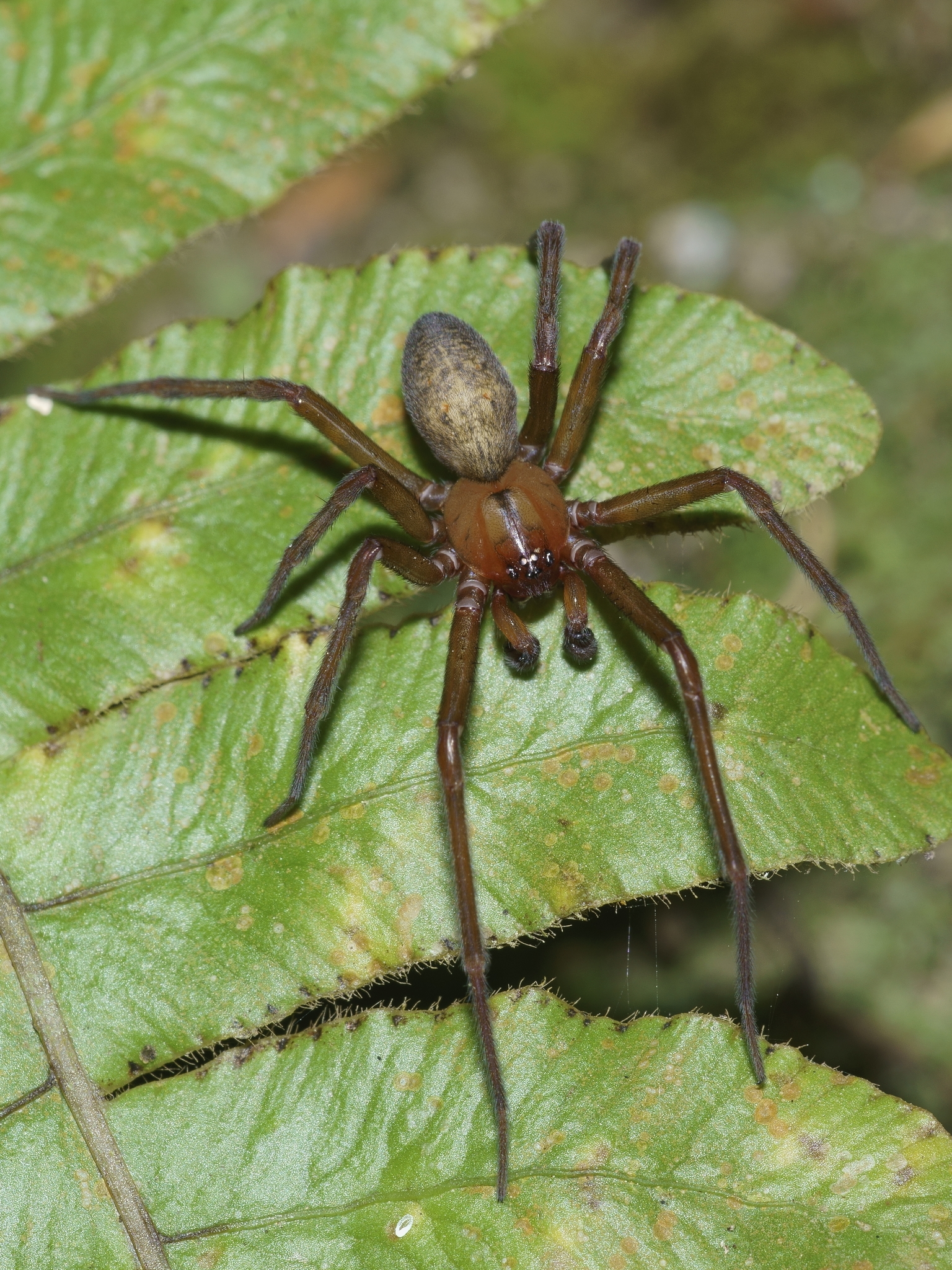
- male M. thilenii

Scientific classification
- Kingdom: Animalia
- Phylum: Arthropoda
- Subphylum: Chelicerata
- Class: Arachnida
- Order: Araneae
- Infraorder: Araneomorphae
- Family: Megadictynidae; Lehtinen, 1967

Genera
- Forstertyna Harvey, 1995; Megadictyna Dahl, 1906

Diversity
- 2 genera, 2 species
- blue: reported countries (WSC)

= Megadictynidae =

Family of spiders

Megadictynidae is a family of araneomorph spiders first described by Pekka T. Lehtinen in 1967. They are endemic to New Zealand.

== Genera and species ==
As of January 2026, this family includes two monotypic genera:

- Forstertyna Harvey, 1995
  - Forstertyna marplesi (Forster, 1970) (type species) – New Zealand
- Megadictyna Dahl, 1906
  - Megadictyna thilenii Dahl, 1906 (type species) – New Zealand
