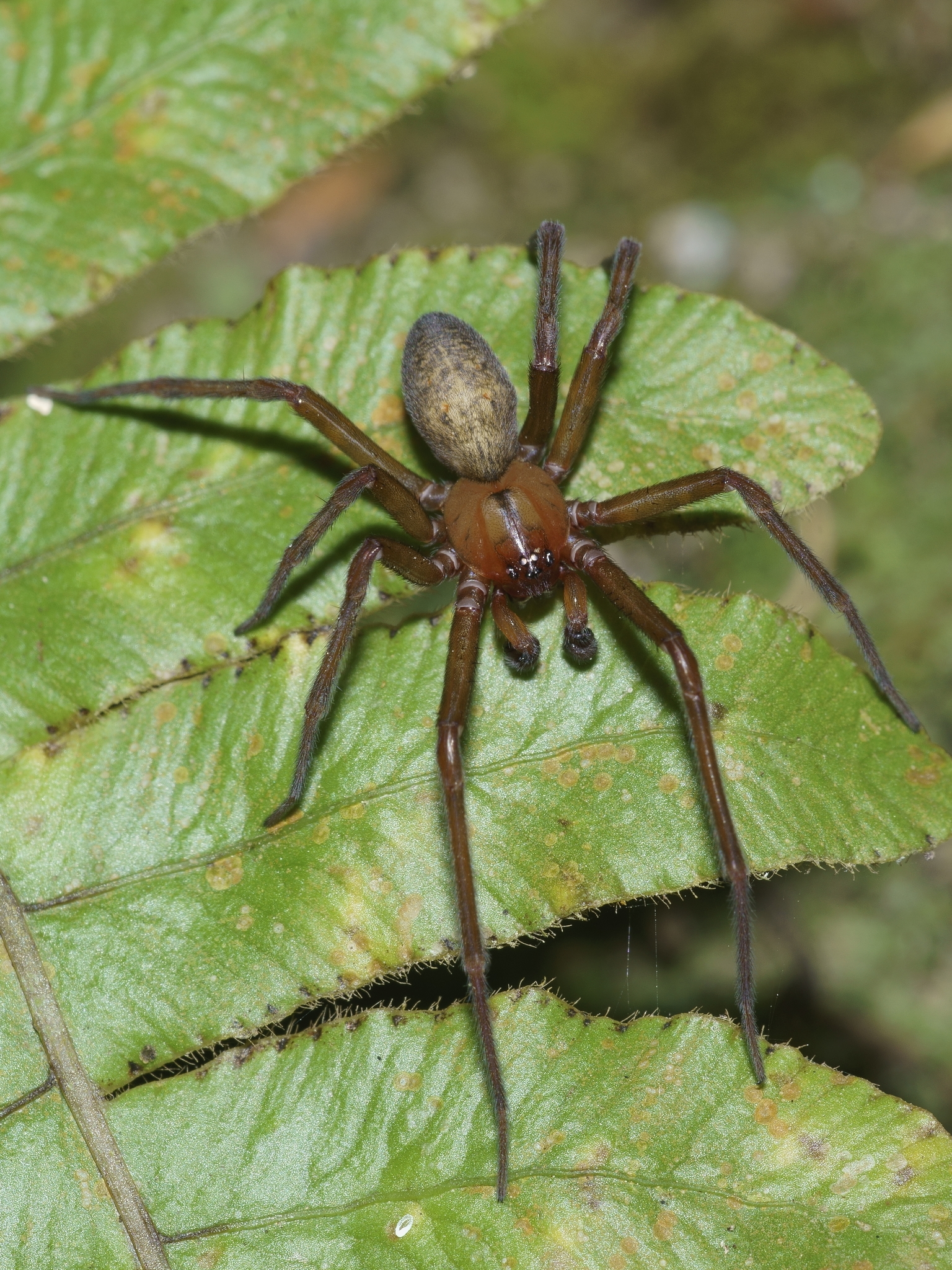

Conservation status
- Not Threatened (NZ TCS)

Scientific classification
- Domain: Eukaryota
- Kingdom: Animalia
- Phylum: Arthropoda
- Subphylum: Chelicerata
- Class: Arachnida
- Order: Araneae
- Infraorder: Araneomorphae
- Family: Megadictynidae
- Genus: Megadictyna; Dahl, 1906
- Species: M. thilenii

Binomial name
- Megadictyna thilenii Dahl, 1906

Synonyms
- Ihurakius forsteri; Megadictyna thileniusi

= Megadictyna =

Genus of spiders

Megadictyna is a genus of spiders in the family Megadictynidae. It was first described in 1906 by Friedrich Dahl. As of February 2019, it contains only one species, Megadictyna thilenii, found in New Zealand. Similar to many RTA clade spiders, Megadictyna build wheel-shaped orb webs.

== Taxonomy ==
The genus and species were first described in 1906 by Friedrich Dahl. The species was undergone numerous revisions.

== Description ==
The female is recorded at 11.87mm in length whereas the male is 9.67mm. The carapace is coloured is dusky yellow with dark brown areas. The legs are yellow brown with dark banding. The abdomen is creamy yellow with brown mottling.

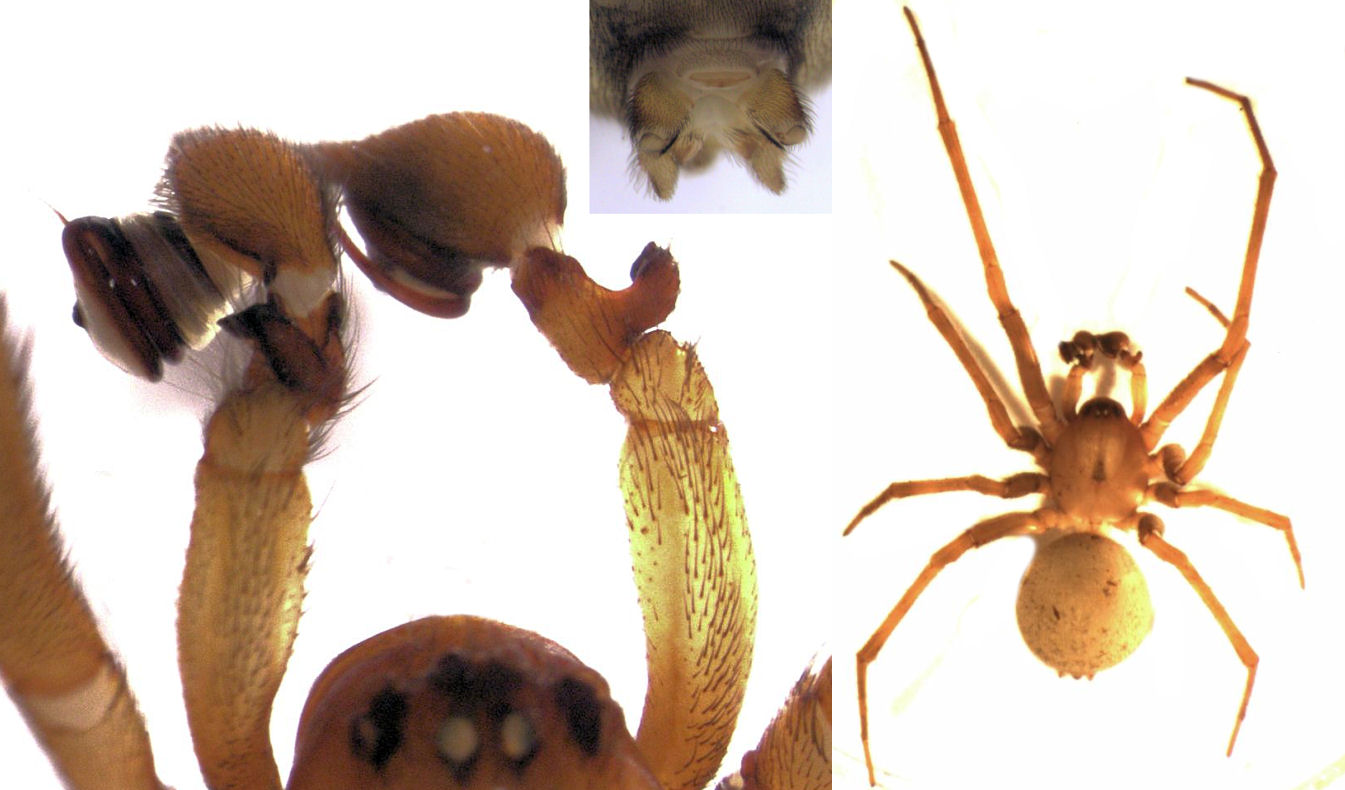
Male

== Distribution ==
This species is widespread throughout New Zealand, except the southern half of the South Island.

== Conservation status ==
Under the New Zealand Threat Classification System, this species is listed as "Not Threatened".
