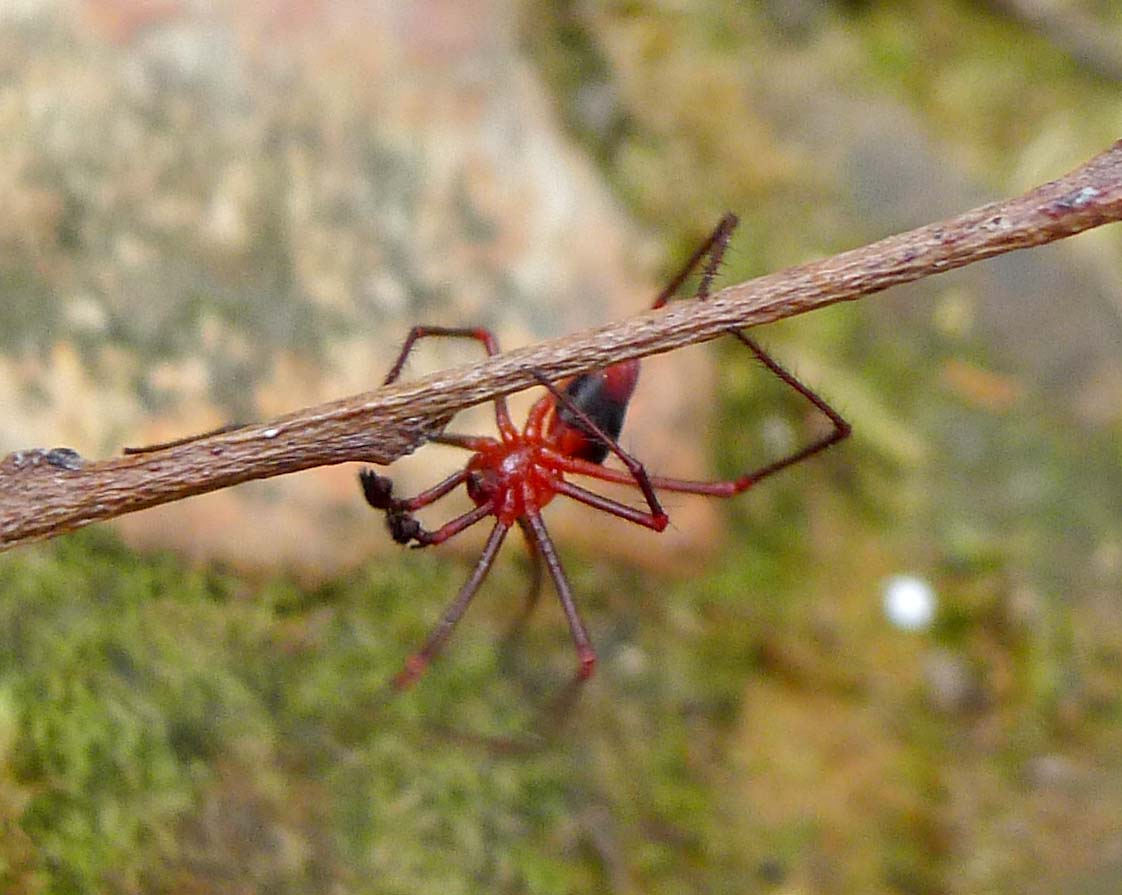
- Male Dimidamus dimidiatus

Scientific classification
- Kingdom: Animalia
- Phylum: Arthropoda
- Subphylum: Chelicerata
- Class: Arachnida
- Order: Araneae
- Infraorder: Araneomorphae
- Family: Nicodamidae; Simon, 1897

Diversity
- 7 genera, 27 species
- blue: reported countries (WSC) green: observation hotspots (iNaturalist)

= Nicodamidae =

Red and black spiders

Family of spiders

Nicodamidae is a family of araneomorph spiders with twenty-seven species in seven genera. They are small to medium-sized spiders found near the ground of eucalypt forest in small sheet webs. The species of this family are only present in Australia and Papua New Guinea. In most cases the cephalothorax and legs are uniformly red and the abdomen black, for which these species are sometimes called the "red and black spiders".

== Taxonomy ==
The family Nicodamidae was established by Eugène Simon in 1897 for his newly described species Nicodamus dimidiatus (now Dimidamus dimidiatus).

Mark Harvey published a major review of the family in 1995. At the time of the review, only two genera were accepted, Nicodamus from Australia and New Guinea, and Megadictyna from New Zealand. Based on a morphological cladistic analysis, Harvey divided the family into two subfamilies, Nicodaminae and Megadictyninae, and erected seven new genera.

In 1967, Pekka T. Lehtinen proposed that Megadictynidae constituted a separate family, but this was not accepted by Harvey. On the basis of molecular phylogenetic analysis, Dimitrov et al. re-established Megadictynidae in 2017, reducing Nicodamidae to seven genera.

== Genera ==
As of January 2026, this family includes seven genera and 27 species:

- Ambicodamus Harvey, 1995 – Australia
- Dimidamus Harvey, 1995 – Australia, New Guinea
- Durodamus Harvey, 1995 – Australia
- Litodamus Harvey, 1995 – Australia
- Nicodamus Simon, 1887 – Australia
- Novodamus Harvey, 1995 – Australia
- Oncodamus Harvey, 1995 – Australia
