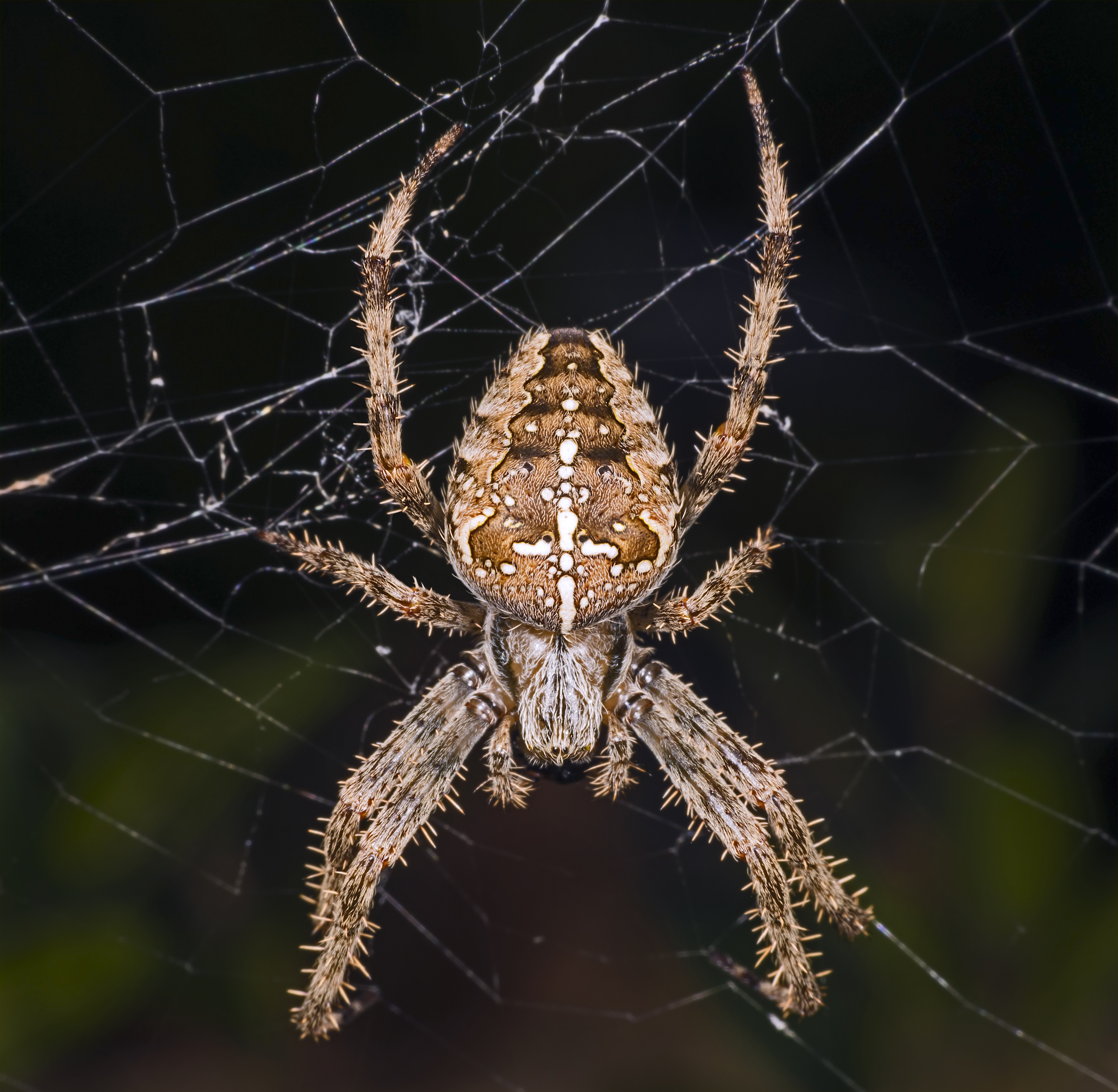
- Female
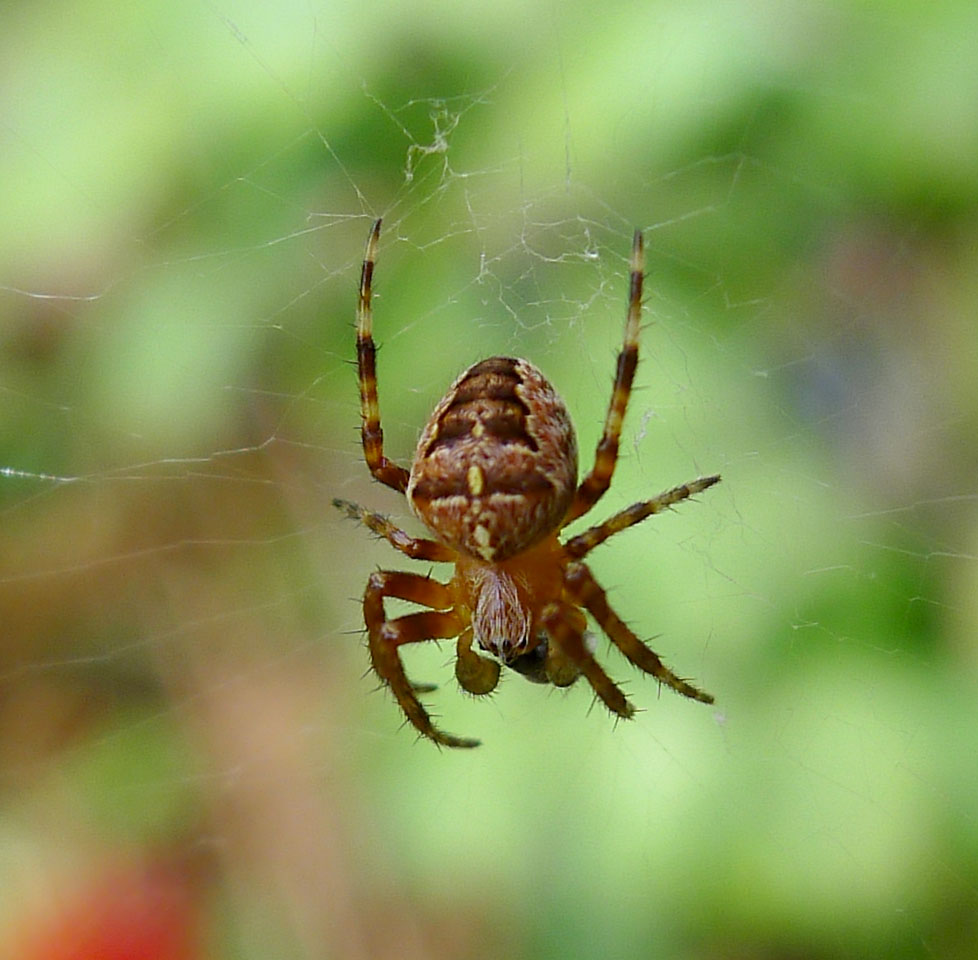
- Male

Scientific classification
- Kingdom: Animalia
- Phylum: Arthropoda
- Subphylum: Chelicerata
- Class: Arachnida
- Order: Araneae
- Infraorder: Araneomorphae
- Family: Araneidae
- Genus: Araneus
- Species: A. diadematus

Binomial name
- Araneus diadematus Clerck, 1757

= Araneus diadematus =

Species of spider

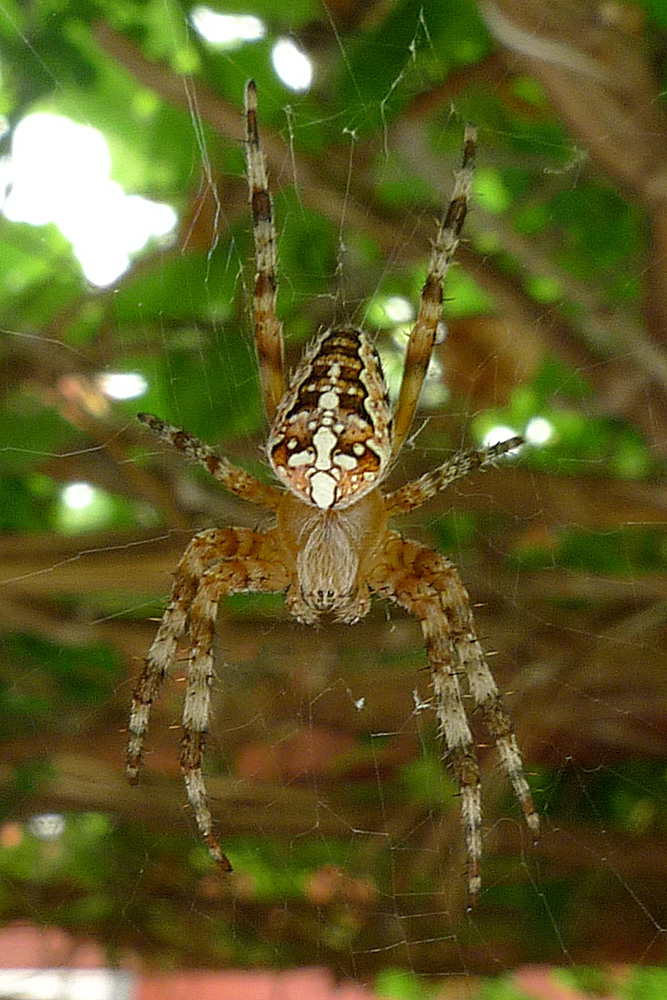
A. diadematus in a web among grapes in Sweden.

The spider species Araneus diadematus is commonly called the European garden spider, cross orbweaver, diadem spider, orangie, cross spider, and crowned orb weaver. It is sometimes called the pumpkin spider, although this name is also used for a different species, Araneus marmoreus. It is an orb-weaver spider found in Europe, where it is native, and North America, where it was introduced.

== Range ==
A. diadematus has a holarctic distribution throughout Europe and across North America, from southern Canada to Mexico, and from British Columbia to Newfoundland.

== Size and markings ==
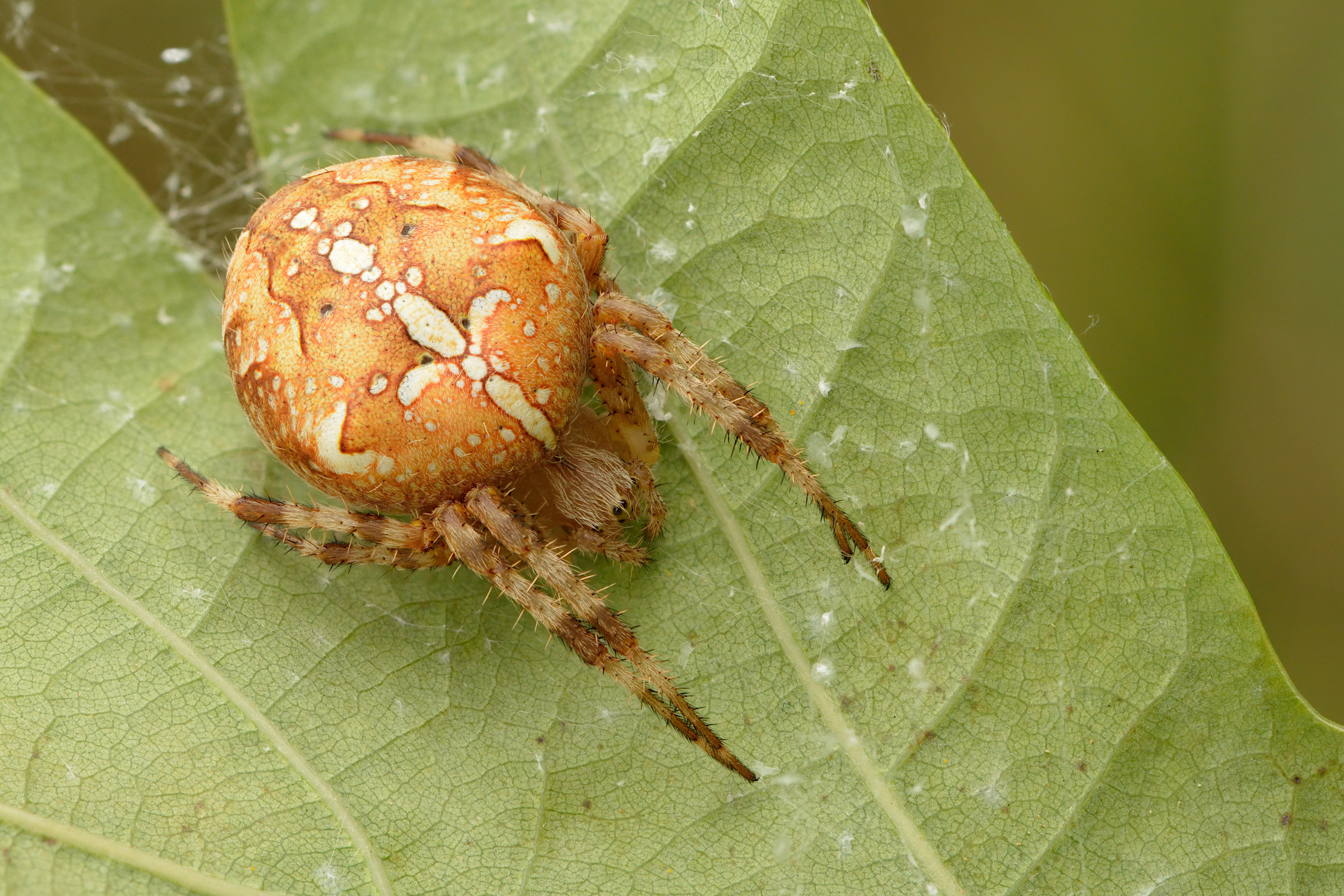
Female, orange-brown colour variant

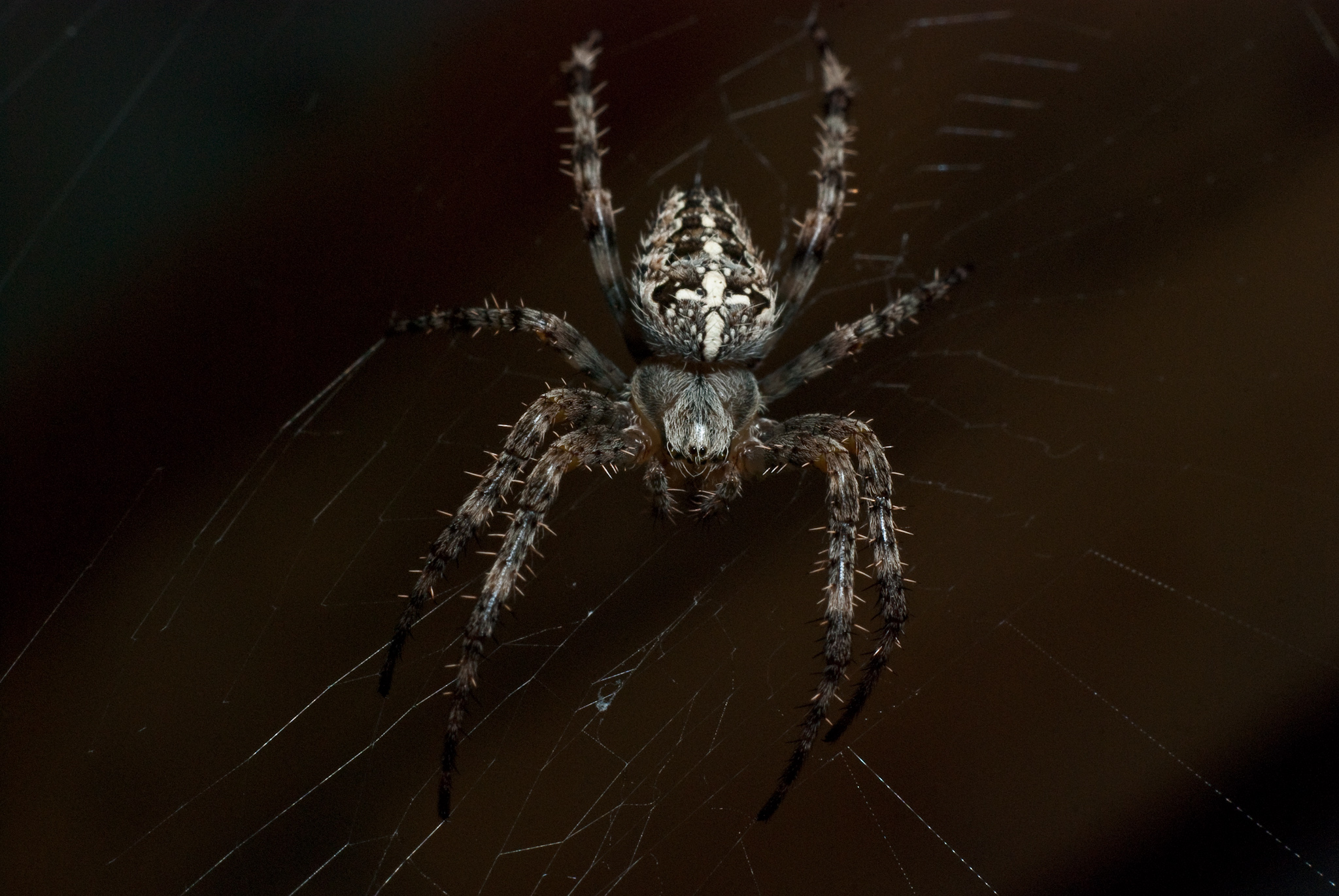
Male, dark variant

Individual spiders' colourings can range from extremely light yellow to very dark grey, but all A. diadematus spiders have mottled white markings across the dorsal abdomen, with four or more segments forming a cross. The markings are formed in cells filled with guanine, which is a byproduct of protein metabolism.

Adult females range in length from 6.5 to 20 mm (0.26 to 0.79 in), while males range from 5.5 to 13 mm (0.22 to 0.51 in). Occasionally, the female will eat the male directly after mating. (See video below.)

== Specialization ==
The legs of orb-weaver spiders are specialized for spinning orb webs. The webs are built by the larger females, which hang head down in the center of the web or remain hidden in nearby foliage, with one claw hooked to a signal line connected to the main orb, waiting for a disturbance to signal the arrival of prey. Prey is then quickly wrapped in silk and bitten, and the prey may hang on the web to be stored for later consumption. The initial bite serves to paralyze the prey and minimize the danger of the spider herself being stung or bitten, and the enzymes thus injected serve to begin liquefaction of the prey's internal structures.

Alongside the use of the web to capture other prey, the spiders are also cannibals and prey on each other, but this only happens just before, during, or just after sexual activity. They attack based on their size, sexual experience, and hunger levels.

A. diadematus is a reclusive creature and only bites humans if cornered or otherwise provoked. It responds to a disturbance by vibrating rapidly in its web until it becomes a blur, a reaction that is assumed to confuse potential predators.

== Gallery ==
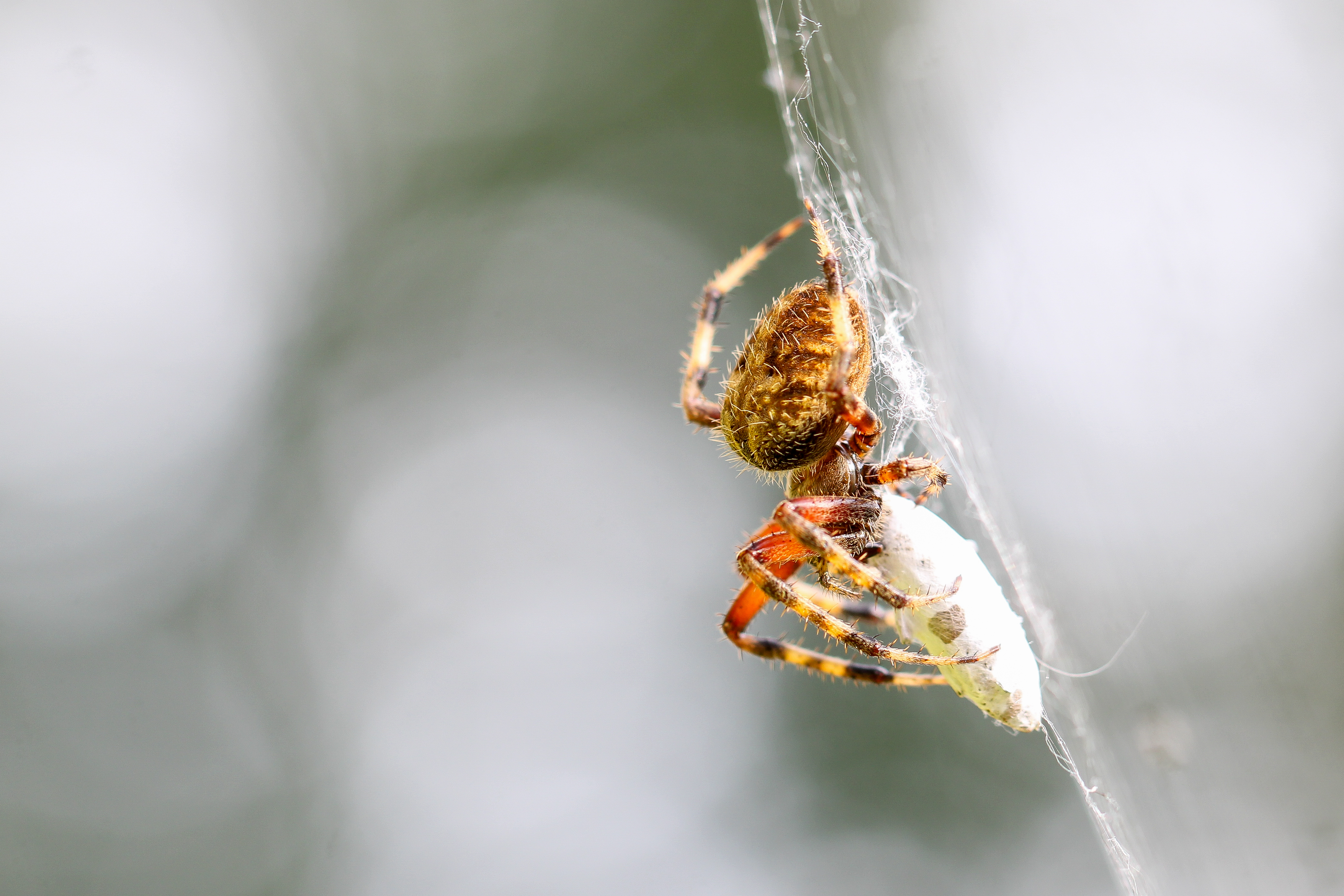
In Virginia, enveloping prey in silk on its web

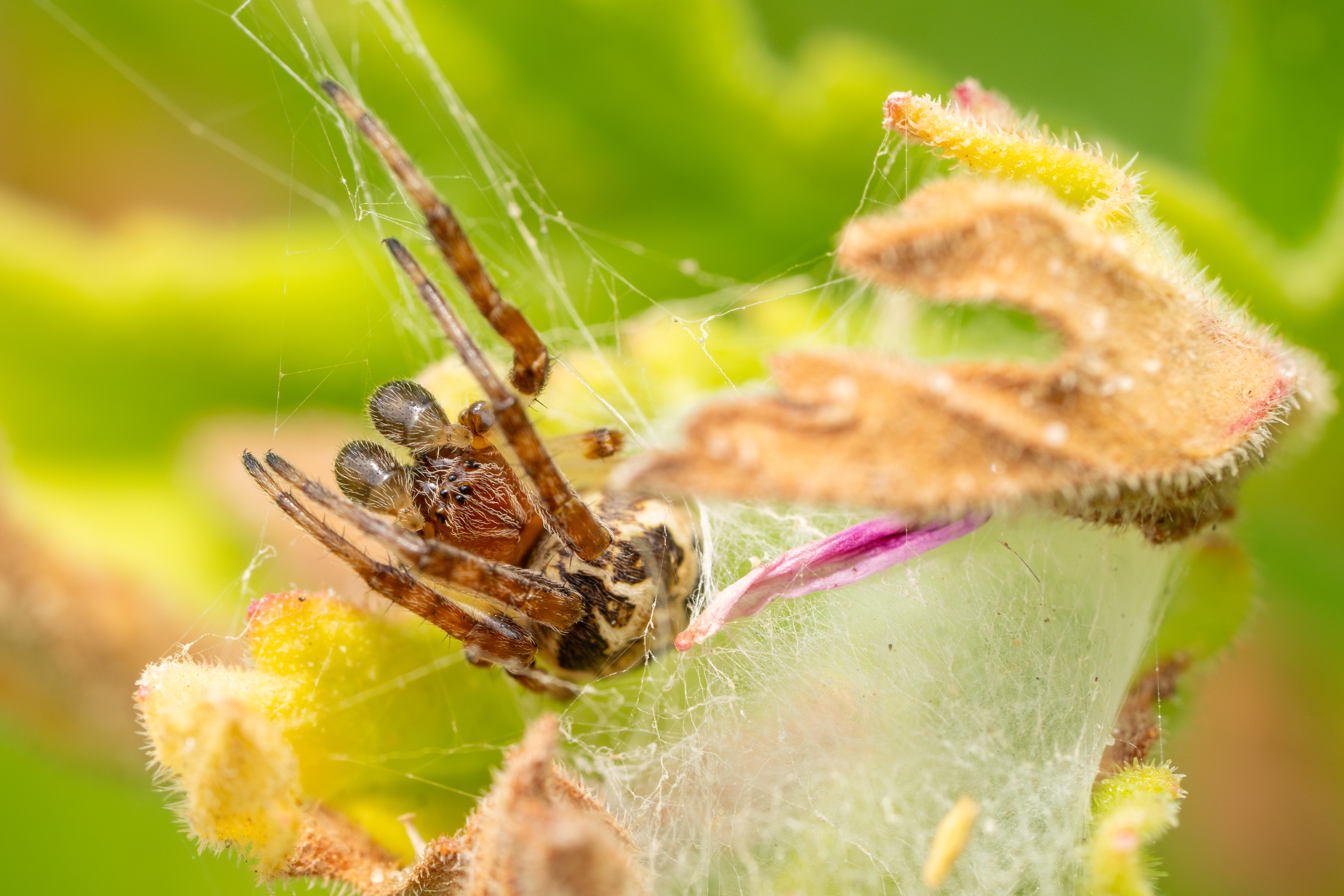
In Tunisia

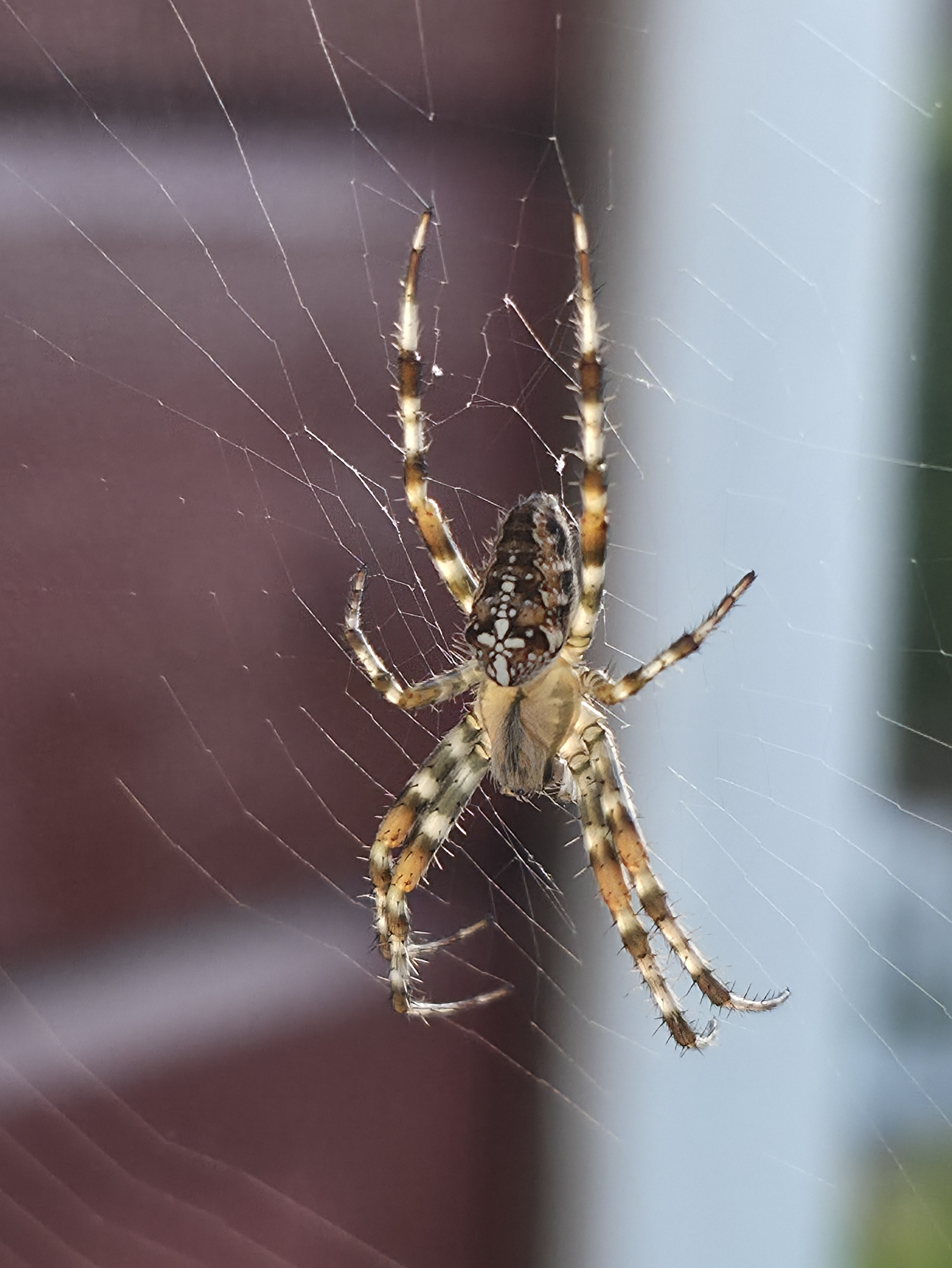
In Norway

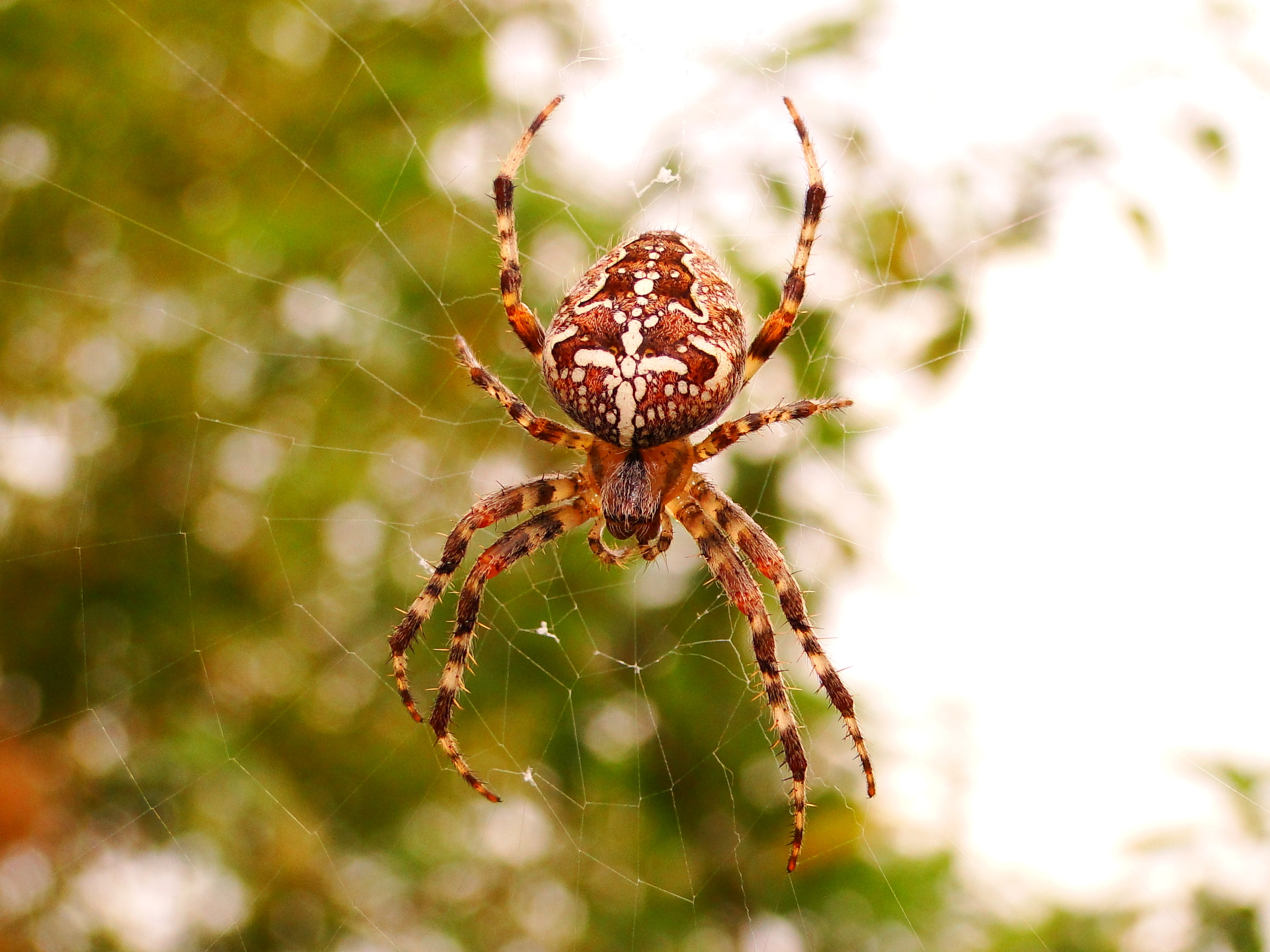
On its web, showing the markings on its abdomen

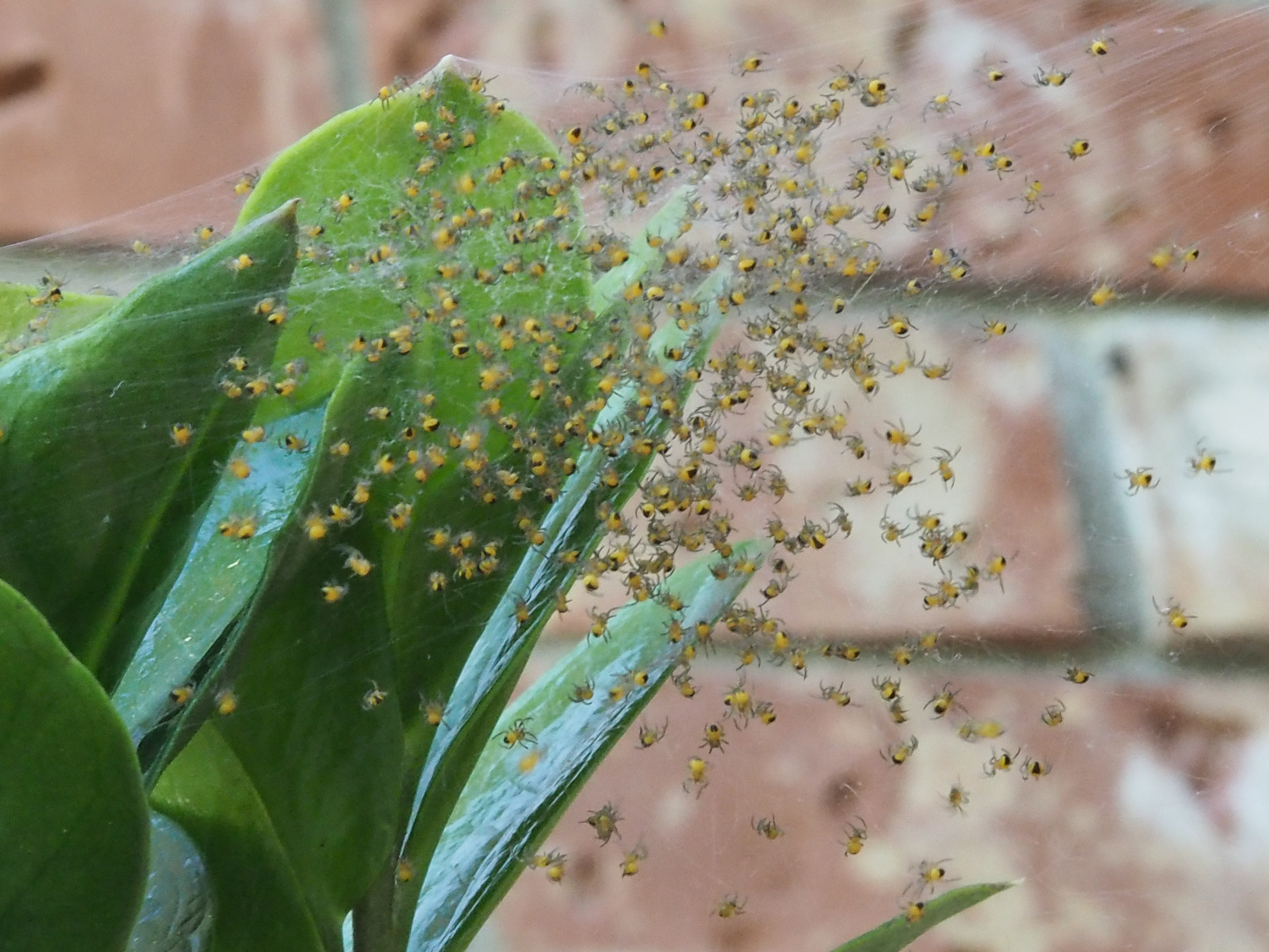
Spiderlings in an orb web

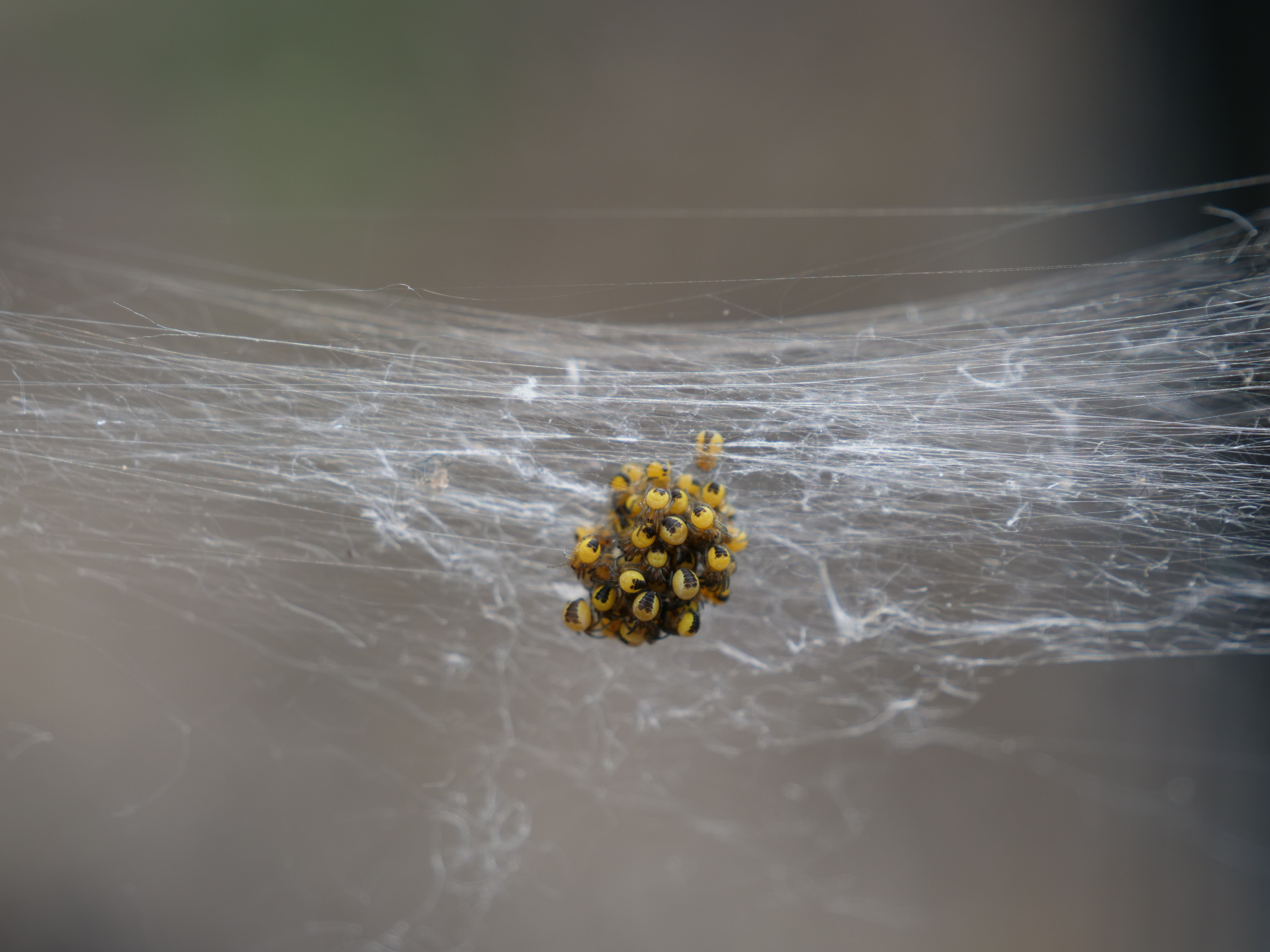
Spiderling cluster

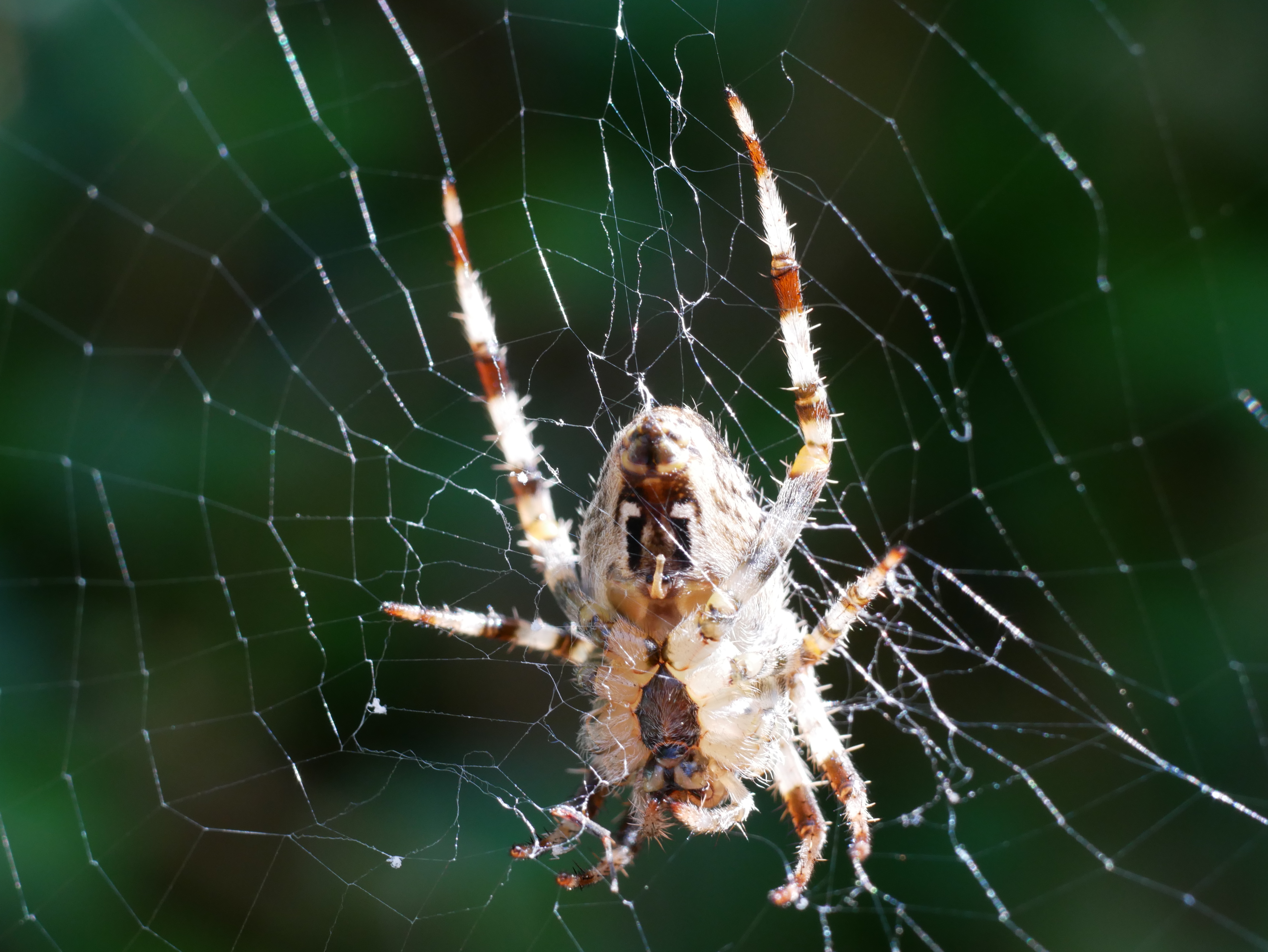
Ventral view, female

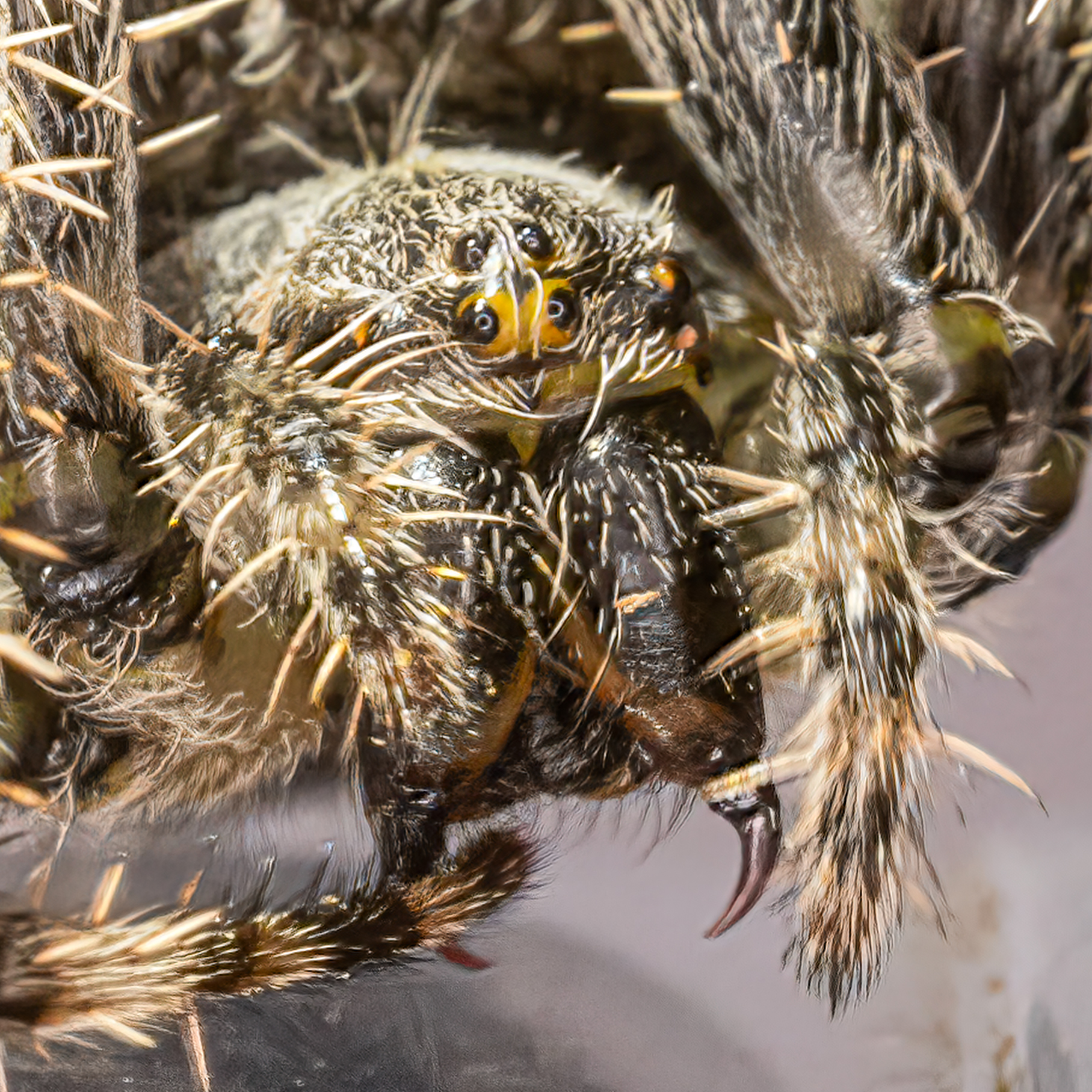
Facial detail, female

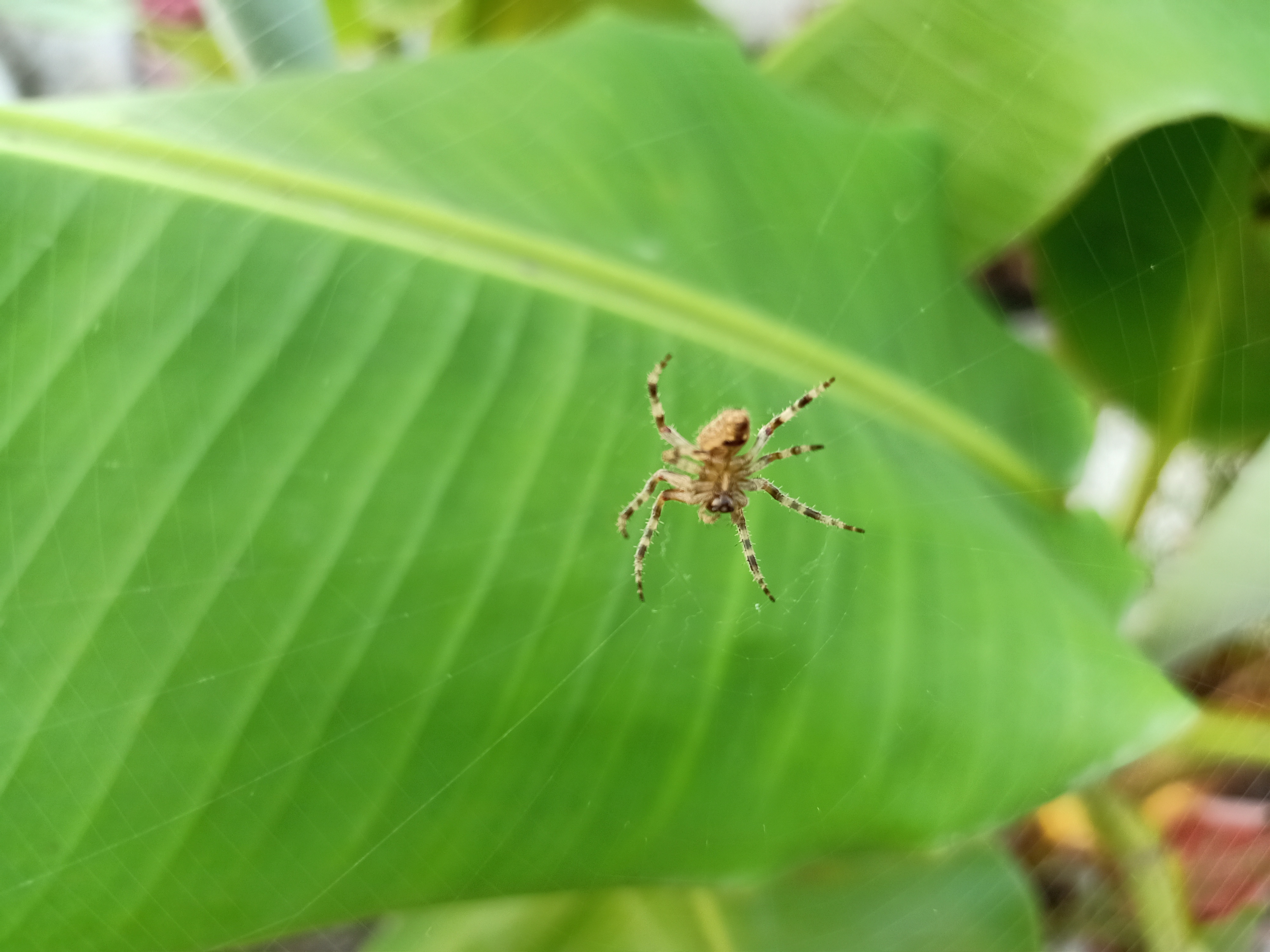
On a banana plant

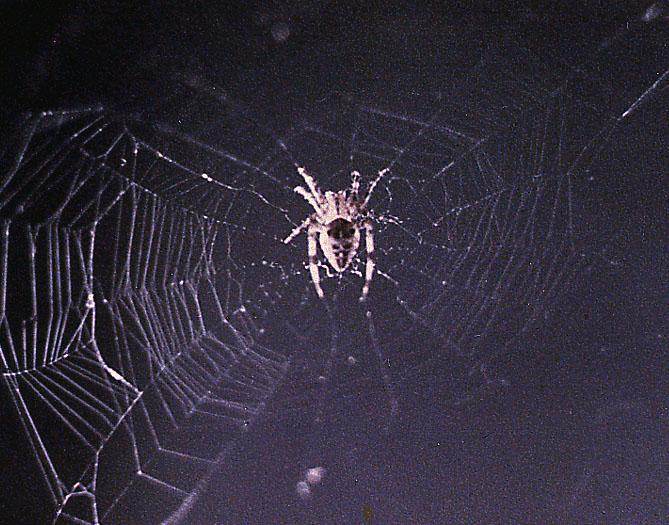
European garden spiders were the first spiders in space, aboard Skylab 3.

Courting male is consumed by the female. (Video, 1m 38s)

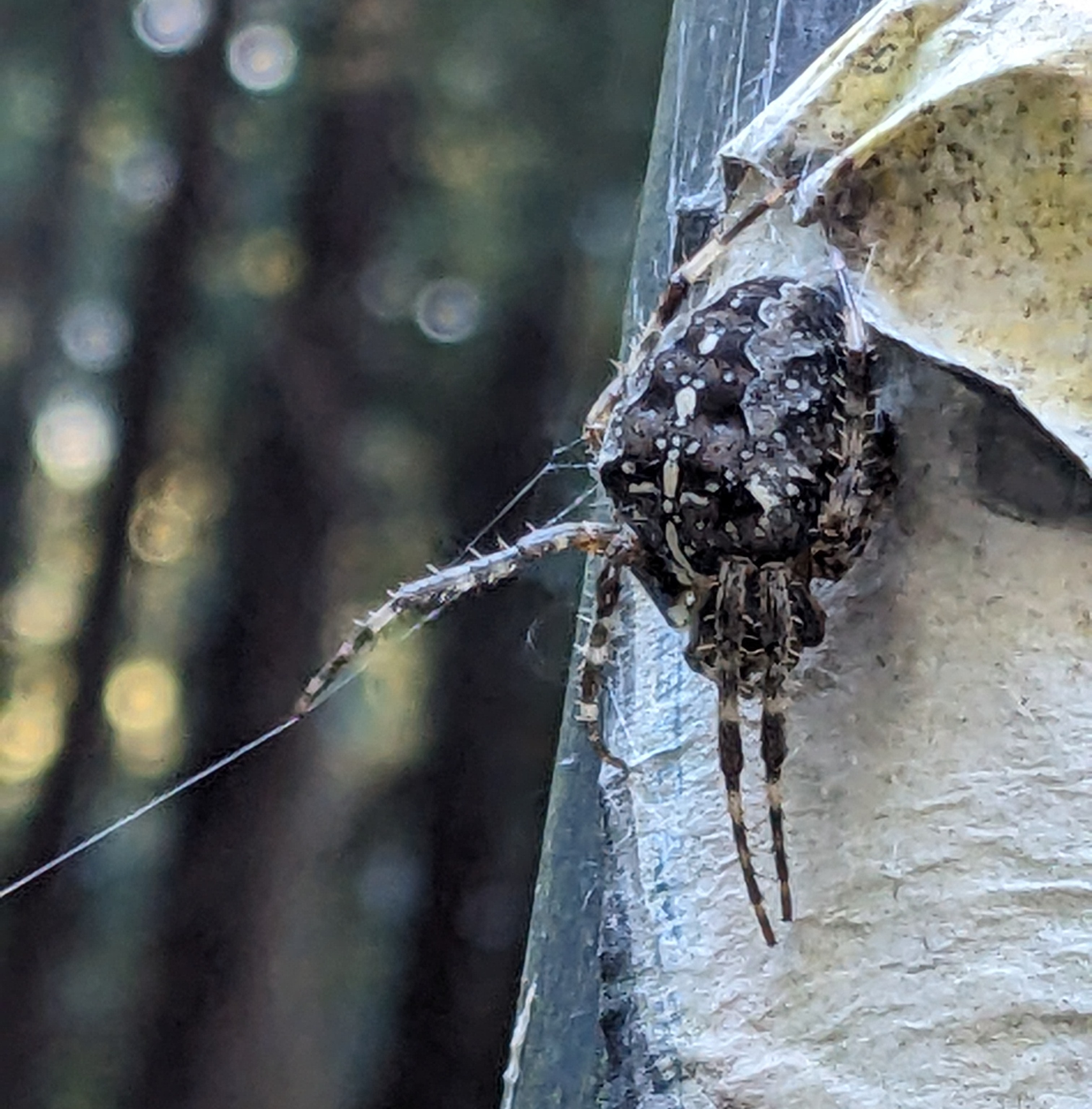
European garden spider with claw hooked on signal line
