= List of Pacullidae species =

This page lists all described species of the spider family Pacullidae accepted by the World Spider Catalog as of January 2021:

== † Furcembolus ==
† Furcembolus Wunderlich, 2008

- † F. andersoni Wunderlich, 2008
- † F. armatura Wunderlich, 2015
- † F. biacuta Wunderlich, 2015
- † F. crassitibia Wunderlich, 2017
- † F. dissolata Wunderlich, 2015
- † F. equester Wunderlich, 2015
- † F. grossa Wunderlich, 2017
- † F. longior Wunderlich, 2017
- † F. tuberosa Wunderlich, 2015

== Lamania ==
Lamania Lehtinen, 1981

- L. bernhardi (Deeleman-Reinhold, 1980) — Borneo
- L. bokor Schwendinger & Košulič, 2015 — Cambodia
- L. gracilis Schwendinger, 1989 — Bali
- L. inornata (Deeleman-Reinhold, 1980) — Borneo
- L. kraui (Shear, 1978) — Thailand, Malaysia
- L. lipsae Dierkens, 2011 — Borneo
- L. nirmala Lehtinen, 1981 (type) — Borneo
- L. sheari (Brignoli, 1980) — Indonesia (Sulawesi)

== Paculla ==
Paculla Simon, 1887

- P. bukittimahensis Lin & Li, 2017 — Singapore
- P. cameronensis Shear, 1978 — Malaysia
- P. globosa Lin & Li, 2017 — Singapore
- P. granulosa (Thorell, 1881) (type) — New Guinea
- P. mului Bourne, 1981 — Borneo
- P. negara Shear, 1978 — Malaysia
- P. sulaimani Lehtinen, 1981 — Malaysia
- P. wanlessi Bourne, 1981 — Borneo

== Perania ==
Perania Thorell, 1890

- P. annam Schwendinger & Košulič, 2015 — Vietnam
- P. armata (Thorell, 1890) — Indonesia (Sumatra)
- P. birmanica (Thorell, 1898) — Myanmar
- P. cerastes Schwendinger, 1994 — Malaysia
- P. coryne Schwendinger, 1994 — Malaysia
- P. deelemanae Schwendinger, 2013 — Indonesia (Sumatra)
- P. egregia Schwendinger, 2013 — Thailand
- P. ferox Schwendinger, 2013 — Thailand
- P. harau Schwendinger, 2013 — Indonesia (Sumatra)
- P. korinchica Hogg, 1919 — Indonesia (Sumatra)
- P. nasicornis Schwendinger, 1994 — Thailand
- P. nasuta Schwendinger, 1989 — Thailand
- P. nigra (Thorell, 1890) (type) — Indonesia (Sumatra)
- P. picea (Thorell, 1890) — Indonesia (Sumatra)
- P. quadrifurcata Schwendinger, 2013 — Thailand
- P. robusta Schwendinger, 1989 — China, Thailand
- P. selatan Schwendinger, 2013 — Indonesia (Sumatra)
- P. siamensis Schwendinger, 1994 — Thailand
- P. tumida Schwendinger, 2013 — Thailand
- P. utara Schwendinger, 2013 — Indonesia (Sumatra)

== Sabahya ==
Sabahya Deeleman-Reinhold, 1980

- S. bispinosa Deeleman-Reinhold, 1980 — Borneo
- S. kinabaluana Deeleman-Reinhold, 1980 (type) — Borneo
