= List of Austrochilidae species =

This page lists all described species of the spider family Austrochilidae accepted by the World Spider Catalog as of December 2020:

== Austrochilus ==
Austrochilus Gertsch & Zapfe, 1955

- A. forsteri Grismado, Lopardo & Platnick, 2003 — Chile
- A. franckei Platnick, 1987 — Chile, Argentina
- A. manni Gertsch & Zapfe, 1955 (type) — Chile
- A. melon Platnick, 1987 — Chile
- A. newtoni Platnick, 1987 — Chile
- A. parwis Michalik & Wunderlich, 2017 — Chile
- A. schlingeri Platnick, 1987 — Chile

== Hickmania ==
Hickmania Gertsch, 1958

- H. troglodytes (Higgins & Petterd, 1883) (type) — Australia (Tasmania)

== Thaida ==
Thaida

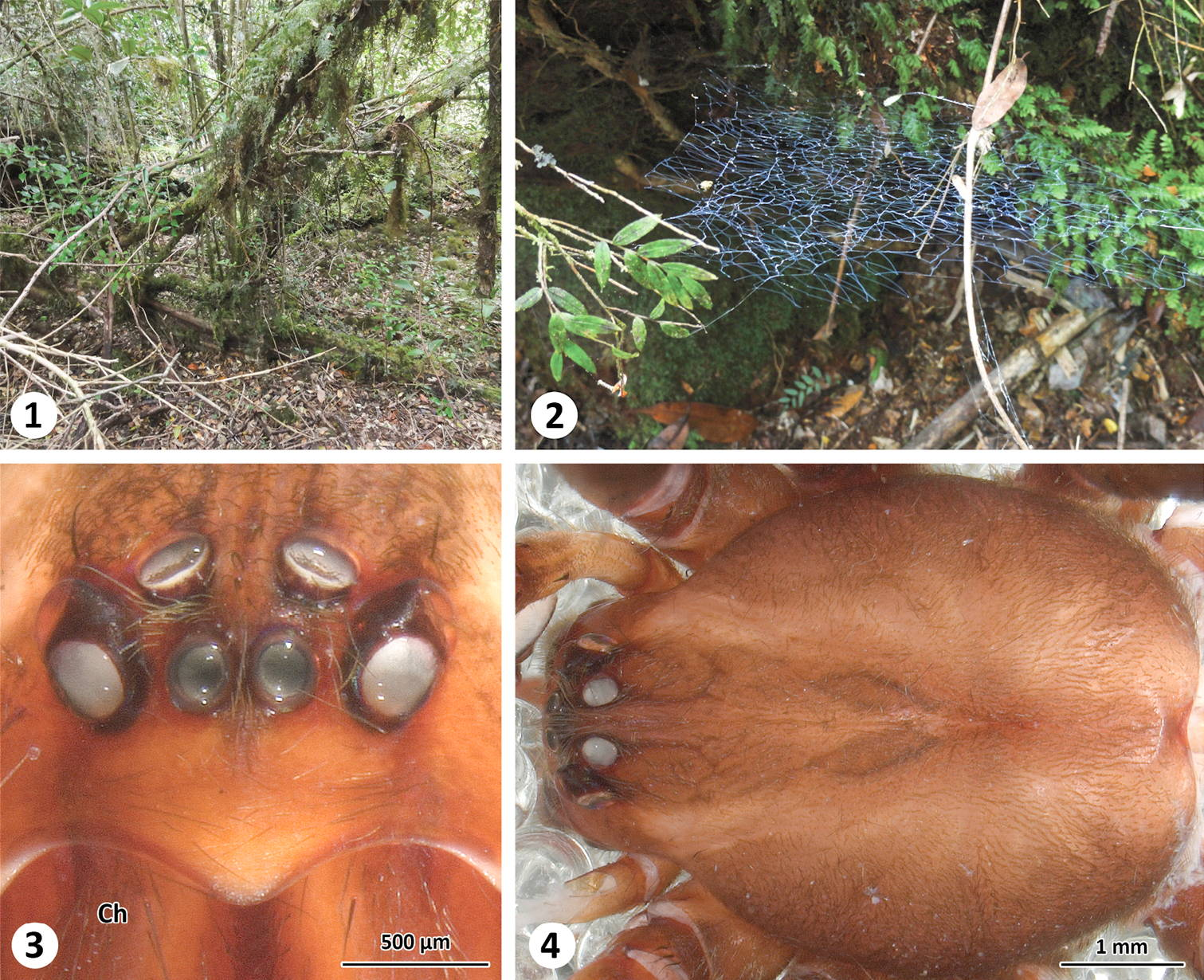
Thaida chepu, male

Thaida Karsch, 1880

- T. chepu Platnick, 1987 — Chile
- T. peculiaris Karsch, 1880 (type) — Chile, Argentina
