= Palpal bulb =

Part of a pedipalp of a male spider

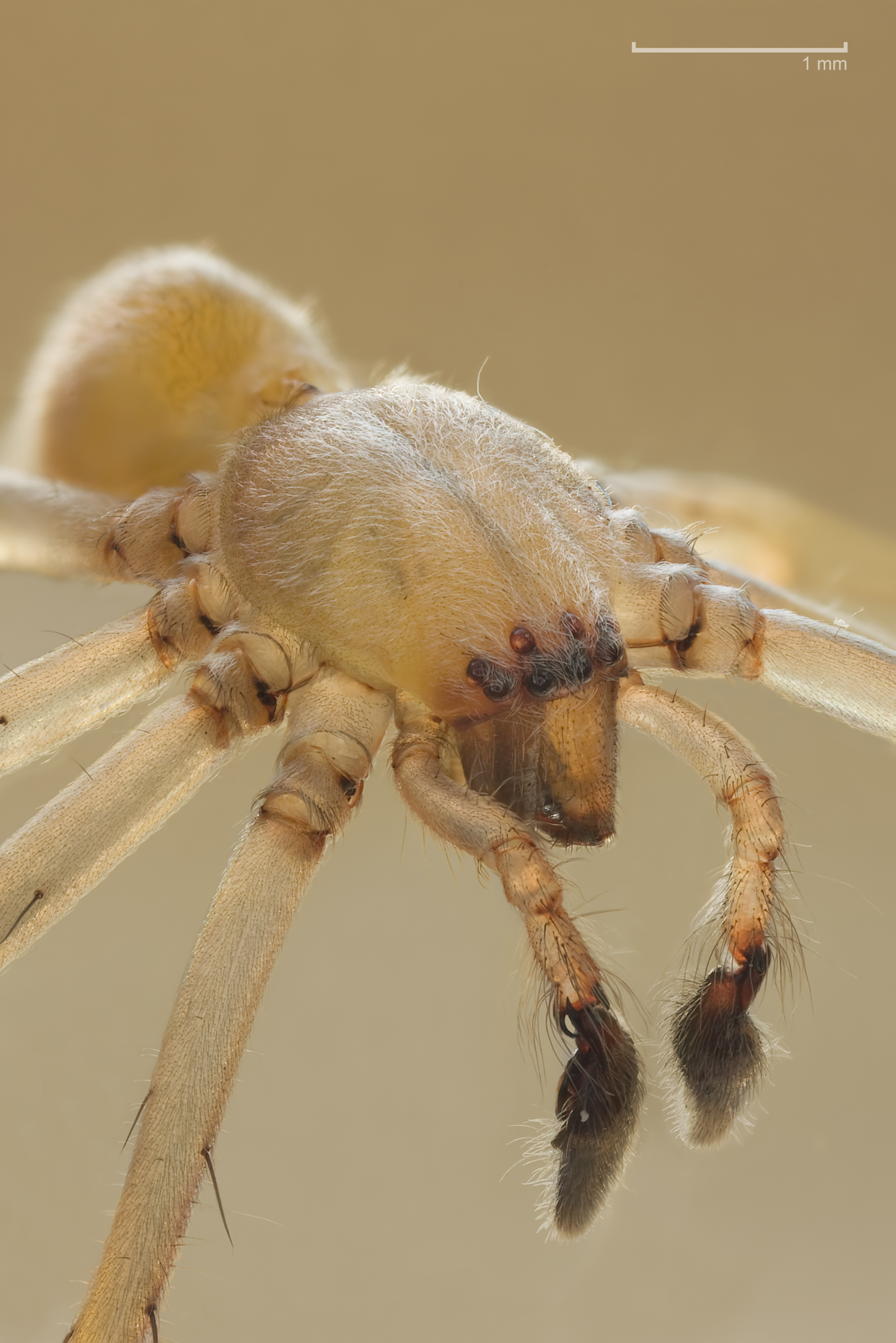
Male Cheiracanthium mildei showing the enlarged and darker palpal bulbs at the end of the pedipalps

The two palpal bulbs – also known as palpal organs and genital bulbs – are the copulatory organs of a male spider. They are borne on the last segment of the pedipalps (the front "limbs" of a spider), giving the spider an appearance often described as like wearing boxing gloves. The palpal bulb does not actually produce sperm, being used only to transfer it to the female. Palpal bulbs are only fully developed in adult male spiders and are not completely visible until after the final moult. In the majority of species of spider, the bulbs have complex shapes and are important in identification.

== Structure ==
The palpal bulb of a mature male spider is borne on the last segment of the pedipalp. This segment usually has touch-sensitive hairs (setae) with nerves leading to them. The bulb itself is entirely without nerves, and hence without sensory organs and muscles, since these depend on nerves for their functioning, although some spiders have one or two muscles external to the bulb and connected to it by tendons. The bulb contains a tube or duct, usually coiled, open near the tip of the bulb and closed at the other end, in which sperm is stored before being used to inseminate a female. The closed end may be expanded, forming a "fundus". The tube usually opens via a narrow tip, the "embolus".

The palpal bulbs are only fully developed in adult male spiders. They develop within the end segment of the palp (the tarsus), and are only completely visible after the final moult. In some species, apart from carrying the palpal bulb, the tarsus is relatively unchanged. In most species, the tarsus changes shape and forms a hollow structure which surrounds and protects the bulb. It is then called a "cymbium". The structure of the palpal bulb varies widely. Most species have a bulb made up of three groups of hardened parts (sclerites), separated from the rest of the palp and one another by elastic sacs called "haematodochae" (also spelt "hematodochae"). Normally, the haematodochae are collapsed and more-or-less hidden between the groups of sclerites, but they can be expanded by haemolymph being pumped in, thus causing the sclerites to move and separate. In some groups of spiders (e.g. Segestrioides species) the bulb is reduced to a single pear-shaped structure. By contrast, members of the Entelegynae have evolved extremely elaborate palpal bulbs, with multiple complexly shaped sclerites.

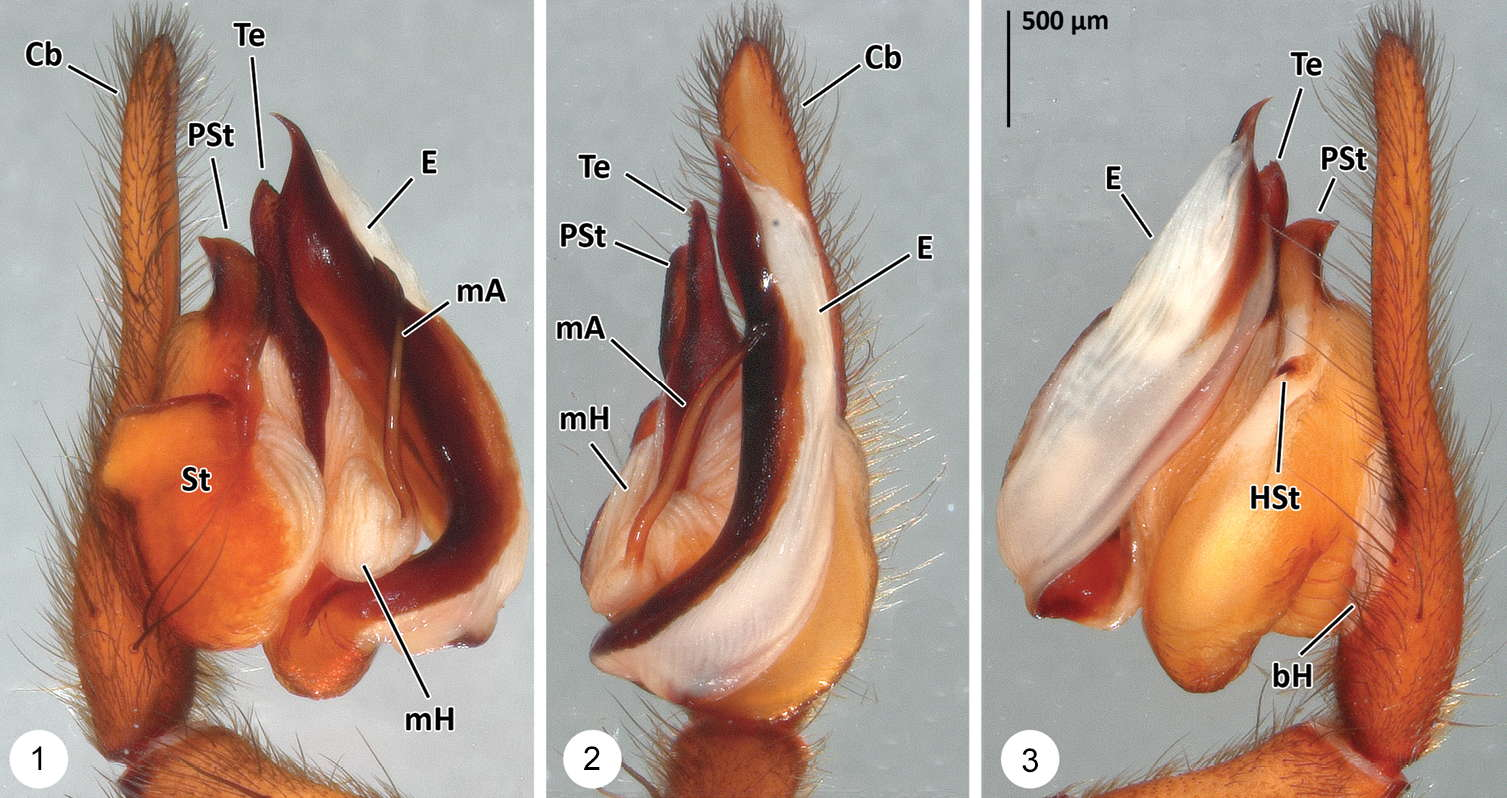
Left palpal bulb of a male Thaida chepu: 1 – from the right (prolateral side nearest the mouth); 2 – from the ventral side, i.e. underside; 3 – from the left (retrolateral side, furthest from the mouth) bH – basal haematodocha; Cb – cymbium; E – embolus; HSt – hook of subtegulum; mA – median apophysis; mH – median haematodocha; PSt – process of subtegulum; St – subtegulum; Te – tegulum See text for further explanation.

Spider specialists (arachnologists) have developed a detailed terminology to describe the kind of palpal bulb found in most spiders. Starting from the end nearest the head:

- the cymbium is the modified tarsus of the palp (Cb in the images)
- the basal haematodocha or proximal haematodocha separates the cymbium from the following group of sclerites (bH in image 3)
- the subtegulum is the main sclerite in the first group (St in image 1)
- the median haematodocha separates the subtegulum from the next group of sclerites (mH in images 1 and 2)
- the tegulum is the main sclerite in the second group (Te in the images), along with the median apophysis (mA in images 1 and 2) and the conductor (where present)
- the distal haematodocha separates the tegulum from the final group of sclerites (not shown in the images); in Lycosidae and certain other taxa, a palea, a part of the distal tegulum that is not fully sclerotized, is formed out of the wall of the distal haematodocha
- the embolus is the main part of the third and final group of sclerites (E in the images)

Other sclerites and "protrusions" (apophyses) may also be present. The diversity of entelegyne palpal bulbs makes it difficult to be sure that structures given the same name actually have the same origin (i.e. are homologous). This applies in particular to the "median apophysis". In mesothele spiders, whose palpal bulbs have the same basic structure as those of entelegyne spiders, the name contrategulum has been used in preference to "median apophysis" for the sclerite immediately following (distal to) the tegulum.

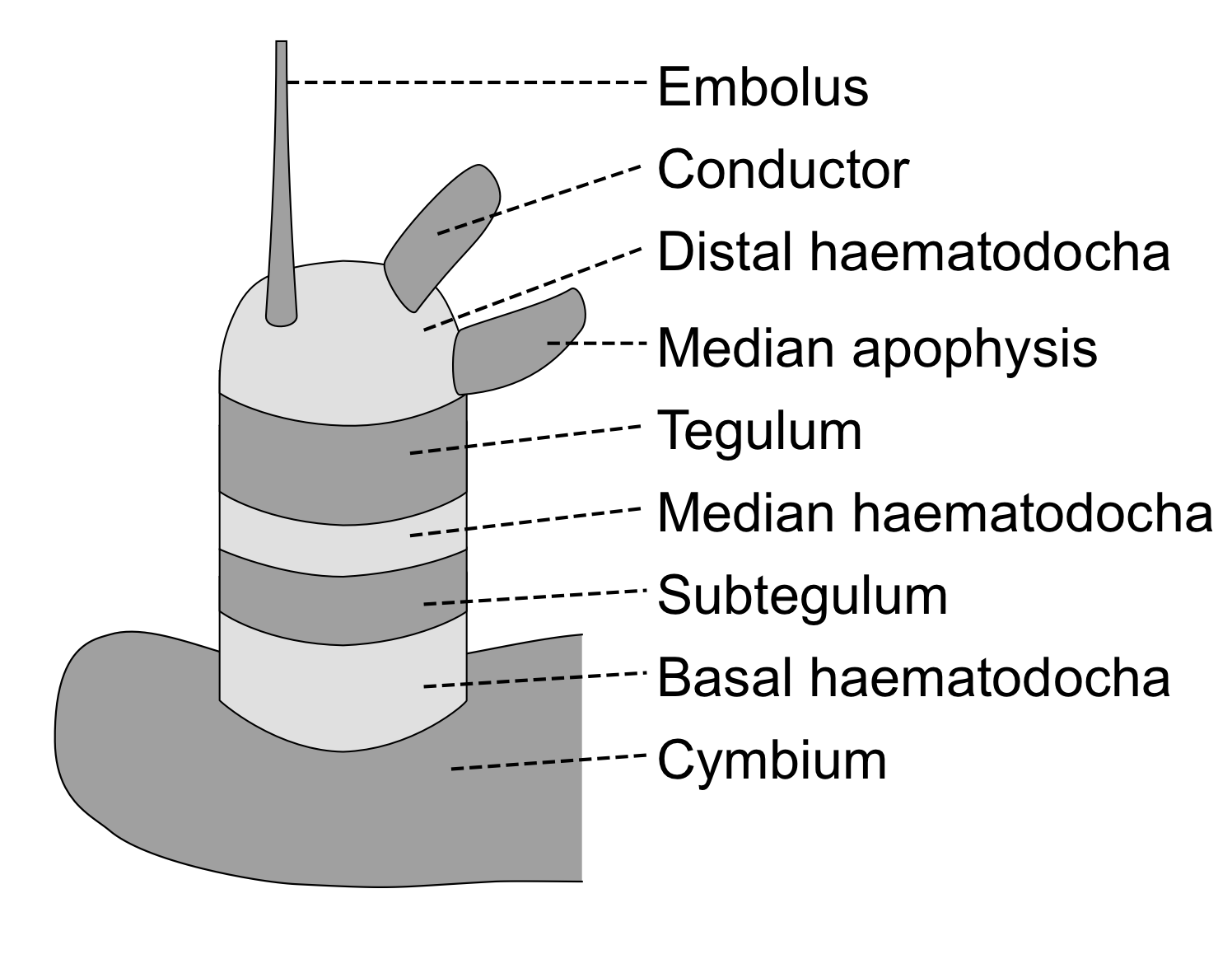
Diagram of palpal bulb components

The palpal bulb is expanded and moved during courtship and copulation. In mesothele spiders, such as Liphistius and Heptathela, there are two muscles, originating lower in the pedipalp, that attach by tendons to parts of the bulb and help to move it, the soft haematodochae allowing both movement and expansion. The same two muscles are also present in mygalomorphs. In araneomorph spiders there is a trend towards loss of muscles and greater development of the basal haematodocha. Most non-entelegyne araneomorphs have both muscles; most entelegynes have neither, although there are some, such as Argyroneta aquatica and Deinopis species, which retain one muscle.

== Function ==
Like most arachnids, spiders have internal fertilization by indirect sperm transfer. The tubular testes of a male spider, which produce sperm, are located in the abdomen. Sperm is exuded from the gonopore (genital opening) of the male and deposited on the top surface of a small "sperm web", constructed for this sole purpose. The male moves to the underside of the sperm web and takes up the sperm into the sperm ducts of the palpal bulbs, either through the base of the web or around its side. Various mechanisms have been proposed to explain how the sperm is taken up. Capillary action and gravity are two possibilities. Where the sperm duct has rigid walls, removal of the liquid via the epithelium surrounding them may suck sperm into the duct. The reverse mechanism may explain how the sperm is ejected. In other species with more flexible duct walls, changes in pressure of the surrounding haemolymph may be involved.

In most spiders (in particular mesotheles and entelegynes) only the end of the bulb – the embolus – is inserted into a female pore during copulation before the sperm is ejaculated. In a minority of spiders with simple palps (mygalomorphs and haplogynes), most or all of the bulb is inserted. Since the palpal bulbs lack sensory organs, the male faces difficulties in ensuring the correct positioning of the palpal bulbs relative to the female, difficulties which have been described as like "those of a person attempting to adjust a complex, delicate mechanism in the dark, using an elongate, elaborately formed fingernail". In many species, a multi-step process is involved. Various structures on the palp and the palpal bulb create a "preliminary lock" on the female, creating a stable support point for further, more precise orientation. The expansion of the haematochodae then causes the various sclerites to brace with one another. The precise details differ from species to species. In Agelenopsis, the embolus at the tip of the bulb first engages with the female, after which the haematodochae expand and cause the conductor to mesh with the female, before finally the embolus enters the female copulatory pore. In Araneus, the median apophysis first hooks onto part of the female epigyne, positioned by the conductor, before inflation of the haematodocha causes the tegulum to rotate, pushing the embolus into the copulatory pore.

== Evolution and phylogenetic significance ==
Palpal bulbs are believed to have evolved from the claws of the male pedipalp. Prior to the male's final moult, the bulb develops from cells at the base of where the claw would be. The transformation of claws to bulbs occurred before the evolution of all living spiders. There is no fossil evidence of the stages by which this transformation occurred.

The early diverging Mesothelae have moderately complex palpal bulbs, in which the same three basic sclerites (hardened parts) are present as in the most derived Entelegynae. Many mygalomorph and haplogyne spiders, along with other non-entelegyne araneomorphs, have less complex palpal bulbs; in some cases (e.g. Segestrioides species) the bulb is reduced to a single pear-shaped structure. By contrast, many members of the Entelegynae have extremely elaborate palpal bulbs, with multiple complexly shaped sclerites. Thomisus spectabilis have disc shaped palpal bulbs.

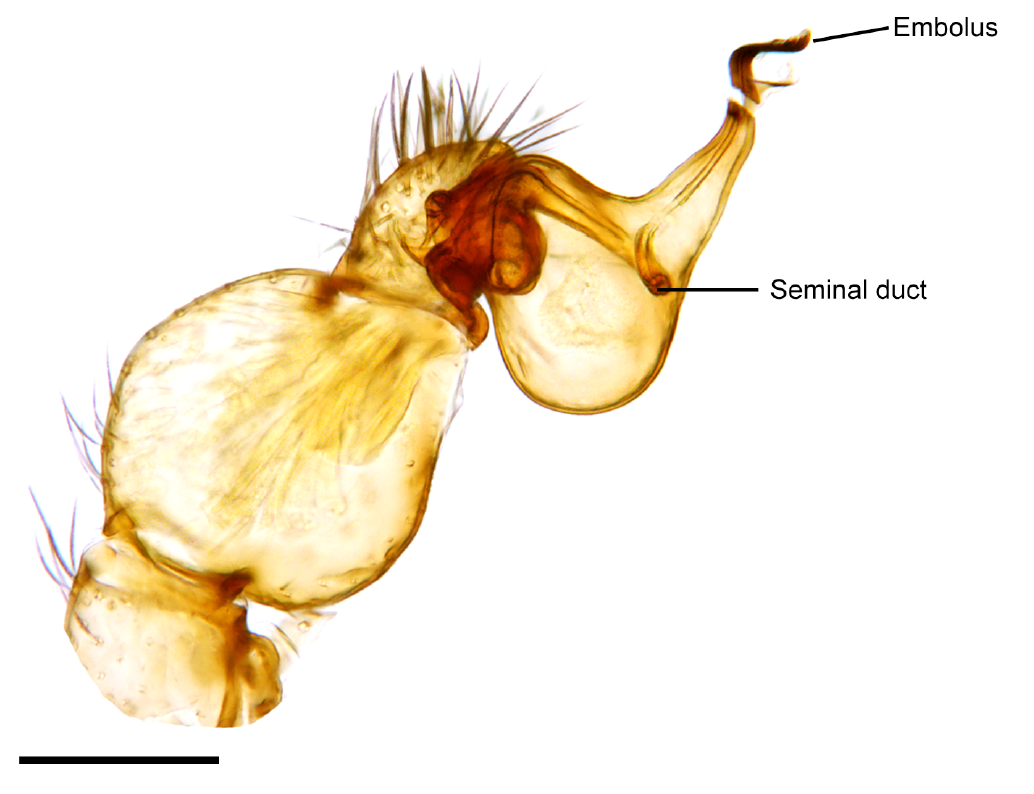
Simple palpal bulb of Unicorn catleyi, a haplogyne spider

Spider phylogeny and palpal bulb complexity

- Aranae (spiders)
  - Mesothelae
  - - Opisthothelae
      - Mygalomorphae
      - - Araneomorphae
          - Haplogynes and other non-entelegynes
          - Entelegynae

Members of the earlier diverging Mesothelae (green) have moderately complex palpal bulbs with muscular movement; the derived mygalomorphs, haplogynes and other non-entelegyne araneomorphs (yellow) have simpler palpal bulbs with muscular movement; Entelegynae species (blue) have the most complex palpal bulbs, most with only hydraulic movement.

Two explanations have been proposed for the pattern of palpal bulb complexity. The ancestors of all modern spiders may have had moderately complex palpal bulbs, with simpler ones evolving in the Mygalomorphae and non-entelegyne araneomorphs and more complex ones evolving in the Entelegynae. Alternatively, ancestral spiders may have had simple palpal bulbs, with parallel evolution of more complex bulbs in the Mesothelae and the Entelegynae. The fact that all the major parts of entelegyne palpal bulbs are already found in mesotheles argues against this view.

The evolutionary change from muscular to hydraulic movement of palpal bulbs is hypothesised to have been driven by the more complex movements this made possible. With only two muscles available, the degree of movement is limited; for example the maximum reported rotation is 300° with muscle movement as opposed to 540° with hydraulic movement. Complex folding of haematodochae in the un-expanded bulb can result in rotations and tilts as the haematodochae expand with bulb's inflation.

Various explanations have been proposed for the evolution of the complex structure of the palpal organs found in most groups of spiders. One is the "lock-and-key" theory. The epigyne of the female spider also has a complex shape, and studies of pairs killed instantaneously during copulation show a precise fit between the male and female structures. Hence the shapes of both the palpal organs and the epigynes may have evolved to ensure that only individuals of the same species can mate. However, this theory predicts that a species long separated from others (e.g. by being isolated on an island or in a cave) would have less complex copulatory structures, and this has not been observed.

Another explanation is "cryptic female choice". Since the correct alignment of male and female structures is difficult, female genitalia may have evolved to ensure that only those males with "good quality" copulatory structures are able to mate, thus increasing the likelihood of having male offspring also able to mate successfully. The more complex movements possible with "advanced" palpal bulbs may provide signals that can be used by females to accept or reject males, during both courtship and copulation. It might be expected that the females of parthenogenetic species, like Triaeris stenaspis, in which males are completely unknown, would have simple genital structures. It has been described as a "mystery" as to why they in fact have "anomalously complex" ones.

== Bibliography ==
- Eberhard, W.G. & Huber, B.A. (2010), "Spider genitalia: precise maneuvers with a numb structure in a complex lock" (PDF), in Leonard, Janet L. & Córdoba-Aguilar, Alex (eds.), The evolution of primary sexual characters in animals, Oxford University Press, ISBN 978-0-19-971703-3, archived from the original (PDF) on 2012-07-14
- Foelix, Rainer F. (2011), Biology of Spiders (3rd p/b ed.), Oxford University Press, ISBN 978-0-19-973482-5
- Haupt, J. (2004), The Mesothelae – a monograph of an exceptional group of spiders (Araneae: Mesothelae), Zoologica, Stuttgart: E. Schweizerbart, ISBN 978-3-510-55041-8
- Huber, Bernhard A. (2004), "Evolutionary transformation from muscular to hydraulic movements in spider (Arachnida, Araneae) genitalia: A study based on histological serial sections", Journal of Morphology, 261 (3): 364–376, doi:10.1002/jmor.10255, PMID 15281063, S2CID 36511235
- Roberts, Michael J. (1995), Spiders of Britain & Northern Europe, London: HarperCollins, ISBN 978-0-00-219981-0
- Ramírez, M. (2014), "The morphology and phylogeny of Dionychan spiders (Araneae: Araneomorphae)", Bulletin of the American Museum of Natural History, 390: 1–374, doi:10.1206/821.1, hdl:11336/18066, S2CID 86146467
- Ruppert, E.E.; Fox, R.S. & Barnes, R.D. (2004), Invertebrate Zoology (7th ed.), Brooks/Cole, ISBN 978-0-03-025982-1
