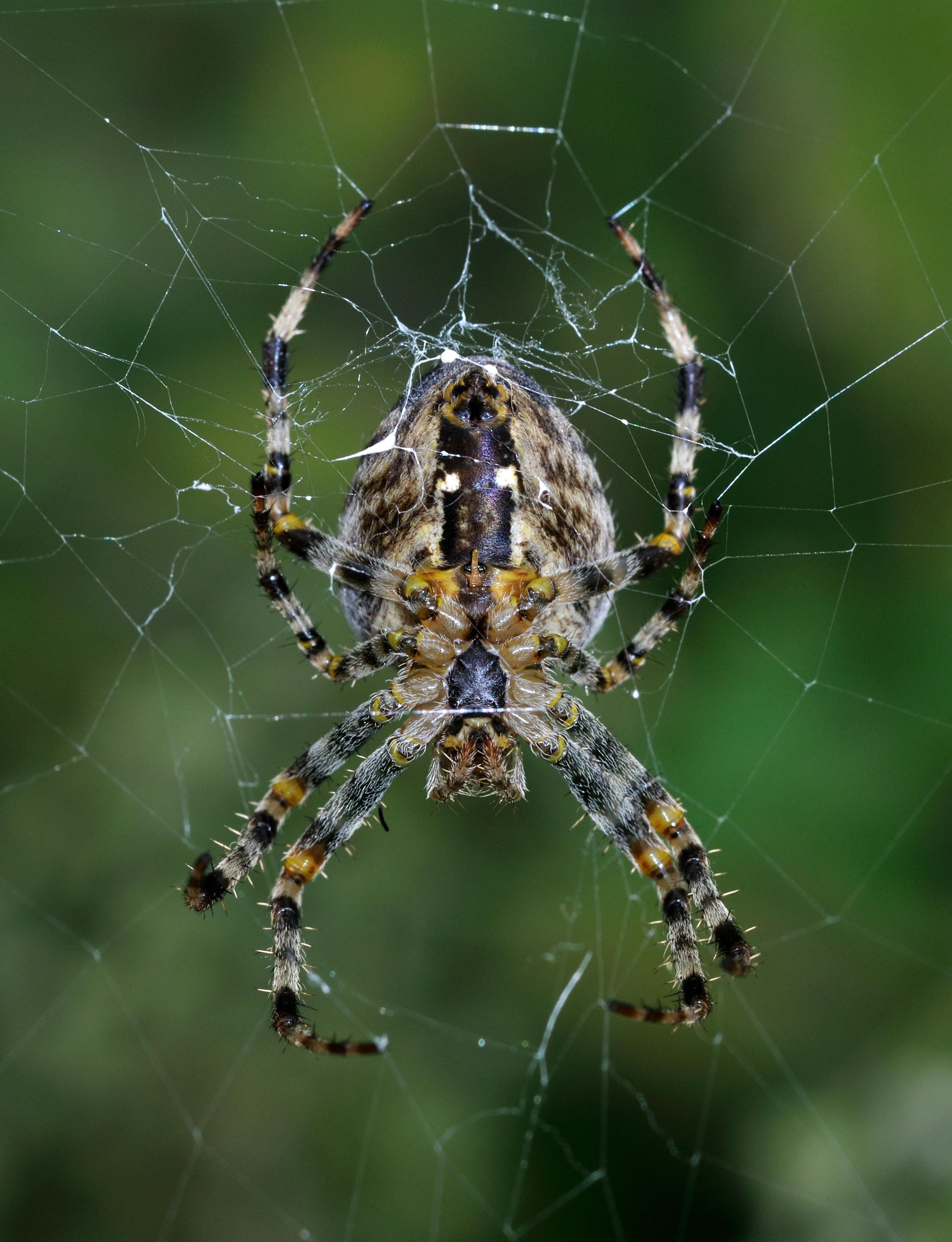
- Underside of Araneus diadematus showing epigynum

Scientific classification
- Kingdom: Animalia
- Phylum: Arthropoda
- Subphylum: Chelicerata
- Class: Arachnida
- Order: Araneae
- Infraorder: Araneomorphae
- Clade: Entelegynae; Simon, 1893

Families
- Unnamed clade: Nicodamoidea; Megadictynidae; Nicodamidae; Araneoidea (17 families); Unnamed clade: Uloboridae; Oecobioidea; Oecobiidae; Hersiliidae; Deinopidae; Titanoecidae; RTA clade (31 families); Incertae sedis: Eresidae

= Entelegynae =

Entelegynae Temporal range: Jurassic–present

Clade of spiders

The Entelegynae or entelegynes are a subgroup of araneomorph spiders, the largest of the two main groups into which the araneomorphs were traditionally divided. Females have a genital plate (epigynum) and a "flow through" fertilization system; males have complex palpal bulbs. Molecular phylogenetic studies have supported the monophyly of Entelegynae (whereas the other traditional subgroup, the Haplogynae, has been shown not to be monophyletic).

The clade contains both cribellate and ecribellate spiders.

== Characterization ==
The Entelegynae are characterized primarily by the nature of the female genital system. The ancestral (plesiomorphic) system is found in non-entelegyne spiders, where there is a single external genital opening in the female's abdomen. One or more males inject sperm from their palpal bulbs via this opening; the sperm is usually stored in special spermathecae (absent in some spiders, e.g. Pholcus). When eggs are released from the ovaries, sperm is also released, and the fertilized eggs pass out of the female's body by the same opening. Sperm that enters first is likely to be the last to fertilize eggs.

In entelegyne spiders, there are three external openings in the female's body. Sperm is injected via one or other of the two separate copulatory openings and enters the spermathecae. Egg release and fertilization occurs in the same way as in non-entelegyne spiders. In this "flow through" system, sperm that enters first can be the first to fertilize eggs.

Spider fertilization systems

Non-entelegyne

Entelegyne

Schematic diagrams showing sperm entering and being stored in the spermathecae; eggs leaving the ovaries and being fertilized; and finally a fertilized egg leaving the female's body

The copulatory openings are usually surrounded by a hardened (sclerotized) area called the epigynum. In some entelegyne families, such as araneids, the epigynum includes a projection that covers or partially covers the copulatory openings. This plays a role in aligning the male's palpal bulb during mating. Male entelegyne spiders generally have more complex palpal bulbs than other groups of spiders and the bulbs are expanded and moved by hydraulic pressure alone, as there are no muscles attached to them.

== Phylogeny ==
In 2016, a large molecular phylogenetic study was published online that included 932 spider species, representing all but one of the then known families. It supported the monophyly of Entelegynae, but presented a somewhat complex picture of its position within Araneomorphae. Araneomorph spiders were divided into two clades: one comprising the families Filistatidae and Hypochilidae plus the clade Synspermiata, the other comprising three non-monophyletic families (Austrochilidae, Gradungulidae and Leptonetidae) plus Palpimanoidea, the four being basal to Entelegynae.

- Araneomorphae
  - - Filistatidae + Hypochilidae
    - Synspermiata (ecribellate haplogynes)
  - - Austrochilidae + Gradungulidae + Leptonetidae (part) (paraphyletic)
    - - Palpimanoidea (paraphyletic in molecular analyses)
      - - Leptonetidae (part)
        - Entelegynae

Most members of the former Haplogynae are placed in the Synspermiata. Filistatidae is placed outside the Synspermiata; Leptonetidae, which was found not to be monophyletic, is placed basal to the Entelegynae.

== Families ==
The cladogram in Wheeler et al. (2017) includes the following families in the Entelegynae. The main difference from previous circumscriptions, such as Coddington in 2005, is that the Palpimanoidea are excluded. A few groups within otherwise entelegyne families have reverted to a haplogyne state: the genera Comaroma, Tangaroa and Waitkera, and some members of the family Tetragnathidae.

- Agelenidae
- Amaurobiidae
- Ammoxenidae
- Anapidae
- Anyphaenidae
- Araneidae
- Arkyidae
- Cheiracanthiidae (syn. Eutichuridae)
- Cithaeronidae
- Clubionidae
- Corinnidae
- Ctenidae
- Cyatholipidae
- Cybaeidae
- Cycloctenidae
- Deinopidae
- Desidae
- Dictynidae
- Eresidae
- Gallieniellidae
- Gnaphosidae
- Hahniidae
- Hersiliidae
- Homalonychidae
- Lamponidae
- Linyphiidae
- Liocranidae
- Lycosidae
- Malkaridae
- Megadictynidae
- Mimetidae
- Miturgidae
- Mysmenidae
- Nesticidae
- Nicodamidae
- Oecobiidae
- Oxyopidae
- Penestomidae
- Philodromidae
- Phrurolithidae
- Physoglenidae
- Phyxelididae
- Pimoidae
- Pisauridae
- Psechridae
- Salticidae
- Selenopidae
- Senoculidae
- Sparassidae
- Stiphidiidae
- Symphytognathidae
- Synotaxidae
- Tetragnathidae
- Theridiidae
- Theridiosomatidae
- Thomisidae
- Titanoecidae
- Toxopidae
- Trachelidae
- Trechaleidae
- Trochanteriidae
- Udubidae
- Uloboridae
- Viridasiidae
- Xenoctenidae
- Zodariidae
- Zoropsidae

No representative of the family Synaphridae was included in the 2017 analysis, but previous analyses placed it in the Entelegynae.
