= Haplogynae =

Infraorder of spiders

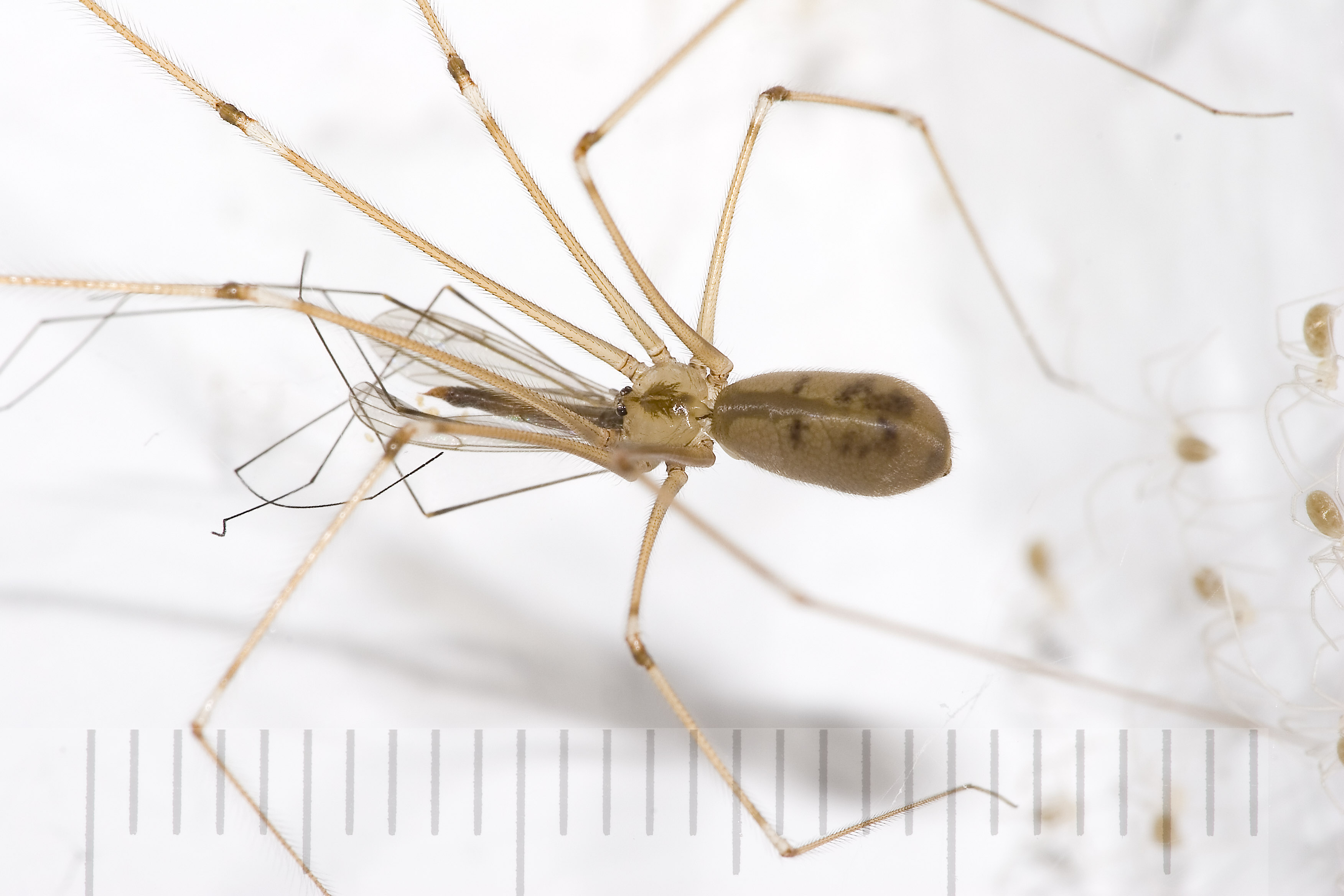
Pholcus phalangioides

The Haplogynae or haplogynes are one of the two main groups into which araneomorph spiders have traditionally been divided, the other being the Entelegynae. Morphological phylogenetic studies suggested that the Haplogynae formed a clade; more recent molecular phylogenetic studies refute this, although many of the ecribellate haplogynes do appear to form a clade, Synspermiata.

Unlike the Entelegynae, haplogynes lack hardened (sclerotized) female genitalia (epigynes).

Most of the species within this group have six eyes, as opposed to most other spiders. Spiders in the genus Tetrablemma (Tetrablemmidae) have only four eyes, as do some members of the family Caponiidae; caponiids may even have only two eyes. However, spiders in the family Plectreuridae have the normal eight eyes.

== Phylogeny ==
The Haplogynae are one of the two major groups into which araneomorph spiders were traditionally divided, the other being the Entelegynae. In 2005, Coddington summarized the relationships of these groups as suggested by morphological phylogenetic studies:

- Araneomorphae
  - Paleocribellatae
    Hypochilidae
  - Neocribellatae
    - Austrochiloidea
    - Araneoclada
      - Haplogynae
      - Entelegynae

Subsequent molecular phylogenetic studies have confirmed the monophyly of some of the groups suggested by morphological studies, while rejecting many others.

A study published in 2015 suggested that two families formerly placed in the Haplogynae do not belong there. Filistatidae groups with Hypochilidae at the base of the Haplogynae; Leptonetidae is basal to the Entelegynae. The similarity of some morphological features of Leptonetidae to those of entelegynes had already been noted.

- Araneomorphae
  - - - Hypochilidae
      - Filistatidae
    - remaining Haplogynae
  - - Leptonetidae
    - Entelegynae

In 2016, a large molecular phylogenetic study was published online that included 932 spider species, representing all but one of the then known families. It "refutes important higher-level groups", including Paleocribellatae, Neocribellatae, Araneoclada and Haplogynae. In the preferred cladogram, the "Haplogynae" are divided among a number of clades basal to the Entelegynae, forming at most a grade. "Haplogynae" in the sense of Coddington (2005) are shaded yellow in the cladogram below; Entelegynae in the same sense are shaded blue. The clade Synspermiata comprises all the ecribellate haplogynes and is consistently recovered, but with low support.

- Araneomorphae
  - - - Hypochilidae
      - Filistatidae
    - Synspermiata (ecribellate haplogynes)
  - - - - Hickmania (Austrochilidae)
        - Archoleptoneta (Leptonetidae)
      - Gradungulidae
    - - - Leptoneta (Leptonetidae)
        - Austrochilus + Thaida (Austrochilidae)
      - - Palpimanoidea (paraphyletic in molecular analyses)
        - - Neoleptoneta + Calileptoneta (Leptonetidae)
          - Entelegynae sensu Wheeler et al. (2017)

== Families ==
As shown above, Filistatidae and Leptonetidae are placed outside the traditional haplogynes in the analysis by Wheeler et al. (2017). Traditional haplogyne families they place in Synspermiata are:

- Caponiidae
- Diguetidae
- Drymusidae
- Dysderidae
- Ochyroceratidae
- Oonopidae
- Orsolobidae
- Pacullidae
- Periegopidae
- Pholcidae
- Plectreuridae
- Scytodidae
- Segestriidae
- Sicariidae
- Tetrablemmidae

Telemidae, traditionally placed in Haplogynae, was not included in the analysis by Wheeler et al. However, it is placed in Synspermiata in other studies. The recently discovered haplogyne family Trogloraptoridae was also placed in Synspermiata.

Several extinct families have also been placed into the haplogynes.

- †Pholcochyroceridae
