= Mirania =

Mirania may refer to:

- Mirania (spider), a junior synonym of Perania, a genus of spiders
- Mirania people, or Bora, an ethnic group of the Amazon
- Mirania language, or Bora, their language

== See also ==
- Miranha (cicada), a genus of cicadas
- Merania, a fiefdom of the Holy Roman Empire
