= Glossary of spider terms =

This glossary describes the terms used in formal descriptions of spiders; where applicable these terms are used in describing other arachnids.

Links within the glossary are shown in this style.

== Terms ==
=== A ===
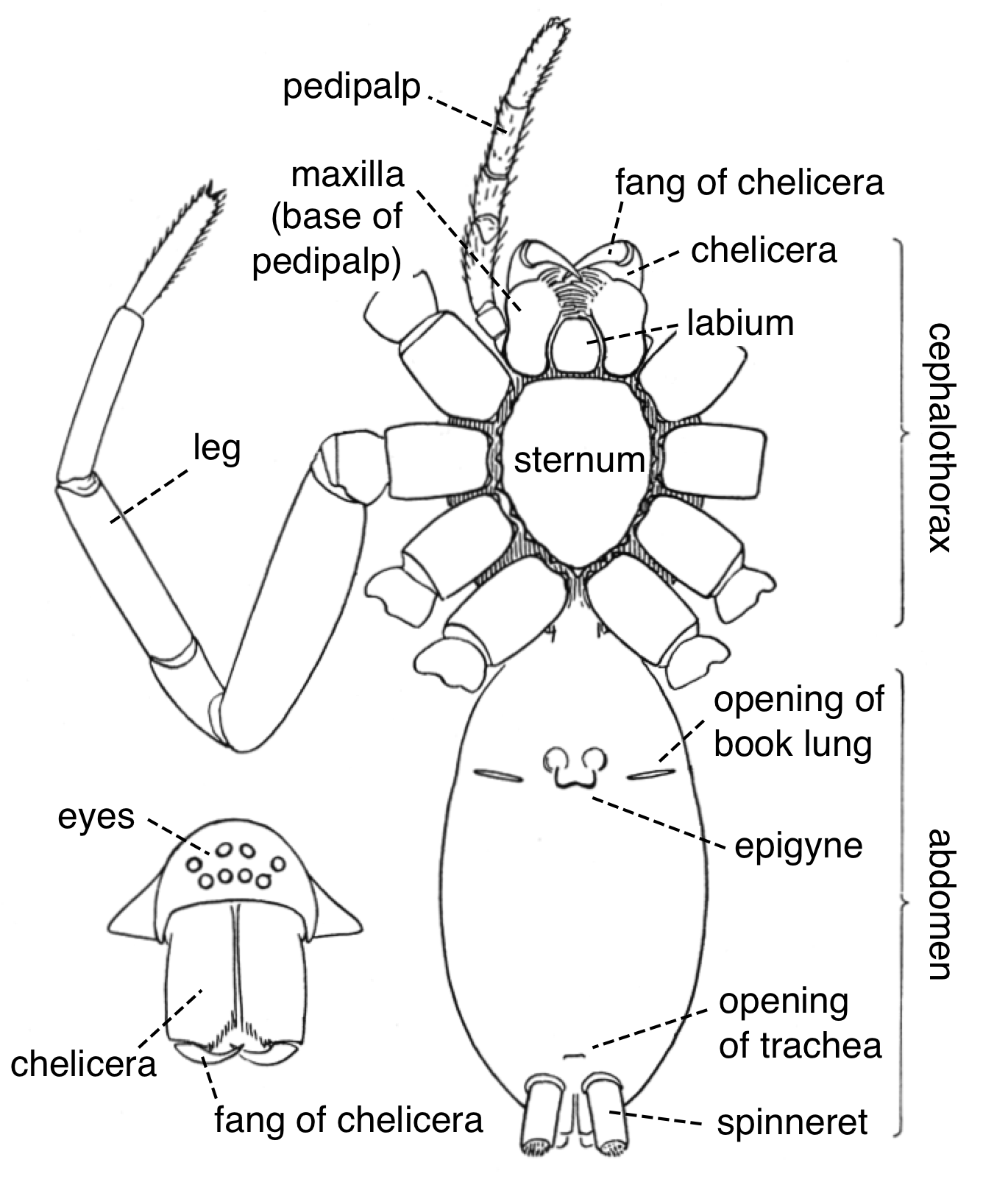
The underside and head of a female ecribellate entelegyne spider

- Abdomen or opisthosoma: One of the two main body parts (tagmata), located towards the posterior end; see also Abdomen § Other animals
- Accessory claw: Modified setae at the tip of the tarsus in web-building spiders; used with tarsal claws to grip strands of the web
- Anal tubercle: A small protuberance (tubercule) above the spinnerets through which the anus opens
- Apodeme: see sigillum
- Apophysis (plural apophyses): An outgrowth or process changing the general shape of a body part, particularly the appendages; often used in describing the male pedipalp: see retrolateral tibial apophysis
- Atrium (plural atria): An internal chamber at the entrance to the copulation duct in female haplogyne spiders

=== B ===
- Bidentate: Having two teeth
- Book lungs: Respiratory organs on the ventral side (underside) of the abdomen, in front of the epigastric furrow, opening through narrow slits; see also Book lungs
- Branchial operculum: see operculum
- Bulbus: see palpal bulb

=== C ===
- Calamistrum (plural calamistra): Modified setae (bristles) on the metatarsus of the fourth leg of spiders with a cribellum, arranged in one or more rows or in an oval shape, used to comb silk produced by the cribellum; see also Calamistrum
- Caput (plural capita): see cephalic region
- Carapace: A hardened plate (sclerite) covering the upper (dorsal) portion of the cephalothorax; see also Carapace
- Carpoblem: The principal tibial apophysis on the male pedipalp; also just called the tibial apophysis
- Cephalic region or caput: The front part of the cephalothorax, separated from the thoracic region by the cervical groove
- Cephalothorax or prosoma: One of the two main body parts (tagmata), located towards the anterior end, composed of the head (cephalic region or caput) and the thorax (thoracic region), the two regions being separated by the cervical groove; covered by the carapace and bearing the eyes, legs, pedipalps and mouthparts
- Cervical groove: A shallow U-shaped groove, separating the cephalic and thoracic regions of the carapace
- Chelate: A description of a chelicera where the fang closes against a tooth-like process
- Chelicera (plural chelicerae): One of two appendages at the front of the carapace, made up of basal portion, the paturon, and the fang; sometimes called the jaw; see also Chelicerae
- Cheliceral furrow: A shallow groove on the basal portion of a chelicera accommodating the fang, usually having teeth on its margins
- Cheliceral tooth: A tooth-like extension on the margin of the cheliceral furrow
- Chilum: A small hardened plate (sclerite) at the base of the chelicerae, under the clypeus
- Claw: see tarsal claw
- Claw tuft: A dense group of hairs or bristles (setae) underneath the paired tarsal claws, usually well developed in hunting spiders

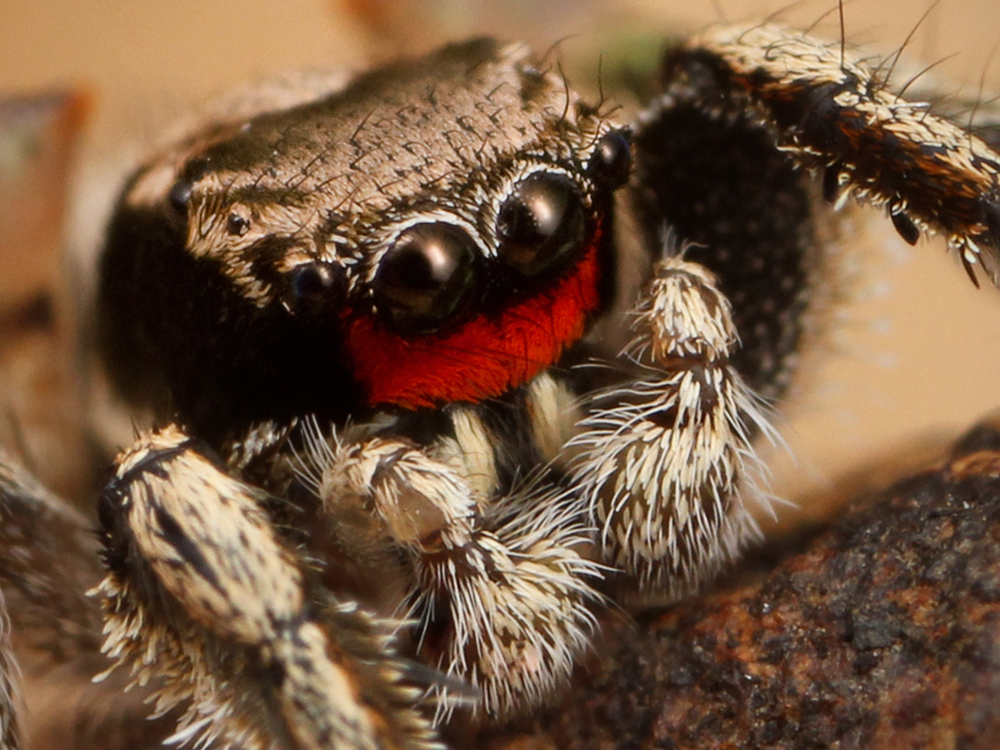
The clypeus of this jumping spider is covered with red scales.

- Clypeus: The area of the carapace between the anterior (frontmost) eyes and the anterior edge of the carapace
- Colulus: A short protuberance in the middle of the underside of the abdomen in front of the spinnerets, considered to be a modification of the cribellum
- Conductor: see palpal bulb
- Copulatory duct: An internal tube (duct) from the copulatory opening through which sperm enters the female; separate from the duct through which fertilized eggs pass in entelegyne spiders
- Copulatory opening: An opening in the ventral abdomen of female spiders; in entelegyne spiders, a double opening in the epigyne through which the embolus is inserted; in haplogyne spiders, a single opening through which male palpal bulb is inserted
- Coxa: see segments
- Crenulate: Having longitudinal ridges
- Cribellum: A sieve-like plate in front of the spinnerets, used in conjunction with the calamistrum; spiders with a cribellum are called cribellate, those without ecribellate; see also Cribellum
- Cuspule: A small spiny outgrowth ("wart") on the endites and labium of Mygalomorphae
- Cymbium (plural cymbia): The end part of the tarsus of the pedipalp in a mature male, usually hollowed out and bearing the palpal bulb

=== D ===
- Dionychous: With two claws on the tarsus of each leg; a feature of spiders in the clade Dionycha
- Dorsal groove: see fovea
- Dorsum: The upper (dorsal) portion or surface of the body or abdomen; the adjective dorsal may be applied to the upper portion or surface of any part of the body; see ventrum

=== E ===
- Ecribellate: see cribellum
- Embolus: see palpal bulb
- Endite: see maxilla
- Endosternite: An internal hardened plate (sclerite)
- Entelegyne: A spider whose female has an epigyne and separate ducts leading to spermathecae for sperm storage and to the uterus for fertilization, creating a "flow-through" system; see haplogyne; see also Entelegynae

Basic arrangement of spider eyes, viewed from above

Arrangement of eyes in most Salticidae, viewed from above

- Epigastric furrow or epigastric fold: A transverse slit towards the front (anterior) of underside of the abdomen; the front pair of book lungs open at the edge of this furrow as do the genital openings (gonopores)
- Epigyne or epigynum (plural epigynes): A hardened plate on the underside of the female abdomen in which the copulatory openings are located; only fully developed in mature females of entelegyne spiders; see also Epigyne
- Eyes: The basic number of eyes is eight, typically arranged in two rows (e.g. as in Gnaphosidae); the front row are the anterior eyes, the row behind the posterior eyes; the four eyes to the edges are the lateral eyes, the four eyes in the centre the median eyes; the anterior median eyes are called the main eyes or direct eyes, while the other eyes are called the secondary eyes or indirect eyes; the number of eyes, their sizes and arrangement varies widely and is characteristic of spider families; see main eye, secondary eye

=== F ===
- Falx (plural falces): A dated term for chelicera
- Fang: The final hinged part of the chelicera, normally folded down into a groove in the basal part of the chelicera; venom is injected via an opening near the tip of the fang
- Femur: see segments
- Fertilization duct: A duct in female entelegyne spiders leading from the spermathecae to the uterus

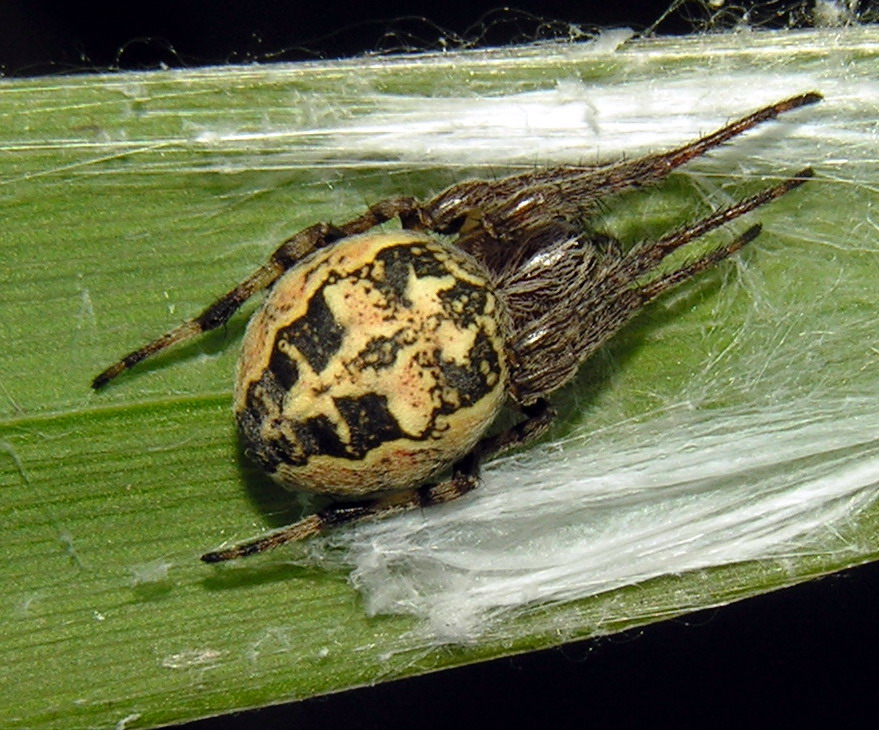
Larinioides cornutus spider showing folium on abdomen

- Folium: A broad leaf-like marking along the medial line of the top of the abdomen
- Fossa (plural fossae): A pit or depression, typically in the epigyne
- Fovea (also called thoracic furrow or dorsal groove): A depression or pit in the centre of the carapace of a spider marking an inward projection of the exoskeleton to which stomach muscles are attached

=== G ===
- Genital opening: see gonopore
- Gnathocoxa: see maxilla
- Gonopore: The genital opening; located in the epigastric furrow; the opening of the duct from the uterus in females and from the testes in males; see also Gonopore
- Gravid: A fertilised female with an enlarged abdomen section right before egg laying has begun.

=== H ===
- Haematodocha (also spelled hematodocha): see palpal bulb
- Haplogyne: A spider whose female lacks an epigyne and in which the same ducts are used to transport sperm to the uterus and to the spermathecae; see entelegyne; see also Haplogynae
- Heart mark: A narrow marking along the top of the abdomen roughly corresponding to the location of the heart

=== L ===
- Labio-sternum mound: A mound separating the labium from the sternum, found in some tarantulas, where it can be a diagnostic feature
- Labium (plural labia): A hardened plate (sclerite) between the maxillae at the front of the sternum; see also Arthropod mouthparts: Labium
- Labrum: see rostrum
- Lamella characteristica or just lamella: a sheet-like sclerite on the palpal bulb of many Linyphiidae species
- Lateral (applied to appendages): Viewed from above or below, the sides of the leg or pedipalp, i.e. the surfaces parallel to the line of sight; see prolateral, retrolateral
- Laterigrade: With legs directed to the side, hence appearing like and moving like a crab; see prograde
- Leg formula: The legs are numbered from the front from I to IV; the relative length of the legs can be represented by four numbers from the longest to the shortest; e.g. 1423 = first leg (leg I) is longest and third leg (leg III) is shortest
- Leg parts or segments: see segments
- Lorum: A set of sclerites covering the dorsal surface of the pedicel.

=== M ===
- Main eye: One of the two anterior median eyes (AME) that have the light-detecting units (rhabdomeres) pointing towards the source; particularly enlarged in the families Salticidae and Thomisidae; see secondary eye, eyes
- Mastidion (plural mastidia): A projection or bump on the chelicerae (not to be confused with teeth)
- Maxilla (plural maxillae; also called endite or gnathocoxa): Modified coxa of the pedipalp, used in feeding; not the structure called by this name in other arthropods, for which see Maxilla (arthropod mouthpart)
- Metatarsus: see segments

=== O ===
- Ocular area or ocular quadrangle: The area of the carapace which includes the eyes.
- Operculum or branchial operculum (plural opercula): One of the plates on the ventral surface of the abdomen, just in front of the epigastric furrow, covering the book lungs, often pale, yellow or orange in colour; two pairs in Mygalomorphae, one pair in other spiders
- Opisthosoma: see abdomen

=== P ===
- Palp: see pedipalp

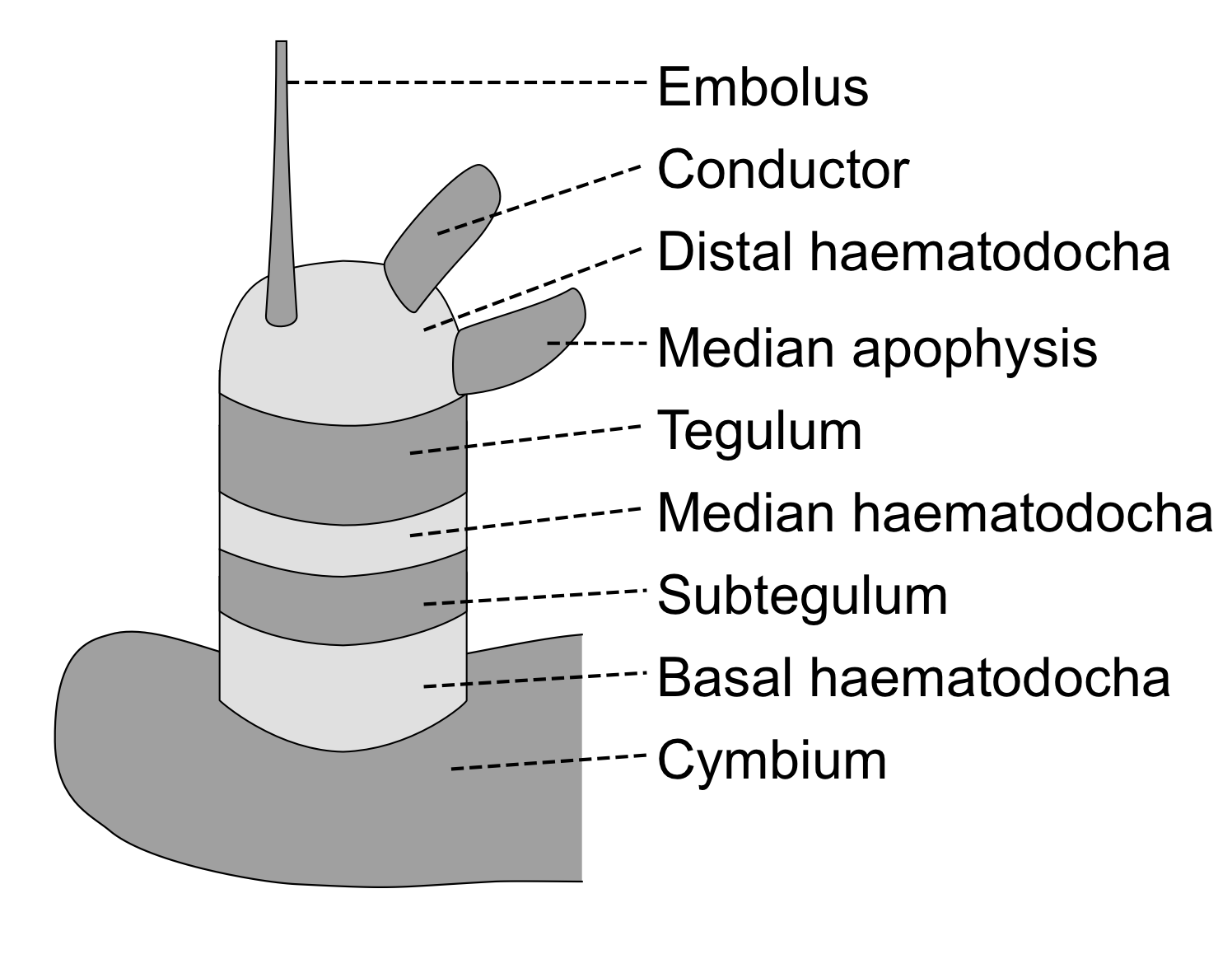
Highly simplified and stylized diagram of the main parts of an inflated palpal bulb, based loosely on Coddington (1990); hardened parts shown darker, membranous parts shown lighter

- Palpal bulb (also called bulbus, palpal organ, genital bulb): The copulatory organ of the male spider, carried on the modified last segment of the pedipalp, used to transfer sperm to the female; see also Palpal bulb

- Conductor: A part of the palpal bulb that accompanies and supports the embolus

- Embolus: The final part of the palpal bulb containing the end of the sperm duct, usually thin, sharp-tipped and strongly hardened (sclerotized)

- Haematodocha (plural haematodochae): A membranous, inflatable part of the palpal bulb

- Median apophysis: A projection (apophysis) of the palpal bulb, below the conductor

- Subtegulum: A hardened part of the palpal bulb nearer its base than the tegulum

- Tegulum: The main hardened part of the palpal bulb

- Paracymbium: An outgrowth of the cymbium on the male pedipalp
- Patella: see segments
- Paturon: The basal segment of a chelicera to which the fang connects
- Pedicel or petiolus: The narrow connection between the cephalothorax and abdomen
- Pedipalp (plural pedipalps or pedipalpi; also called just palp): The second appendage of the cephalothorax in front of the first leg; bears the palpal bulb in male spiders; see segments, see also Pedipalp
- Plumose: Used to describe hairs (setae) having outgrowths or appendages on two sides, giving a feather-like appearance; the appendages vary in number, size and arrangement
- Pluridentate: Having multiple teeth
- Postembryo (also called larva): The stage of development between hatching from the egg and first molting
- Preening brush: a dense cluster of setae near the ventral tip of the posterior metatarsi; called a preening comb when present as a transverse row of setae.
- Procurved: Used to describe a structure which is curved in such a way that the outer edges are in front of the central part; opposite recurved
- Prolateral: Viewed from above or below, the side of a leg or pedipalp nearest the mouth, i.e. the side facing forward; opposite retrolateral (includes diagram)
- Promarginal: The side of the cheliceral furrow facing forward; particularly used for describing teeth; opposite retromarginal
- Prosoma: see cephalothorax

=== R ===
- Rastellum (plural rastella): An often rake-like structure at end of the chelicera in mygalomorph spiders; used in burrowing
- Rebordered: Having a thickened edge (i.e. border) (more rarely seen as reborded, from the French rebordé, e.g. in Levy (1984)); particularly used of the labium

Terminology of appendage surfaces

- Receptaculum (plural receptacula): see spermatheca
- Recurved: Used to describe a structure which is curved in such a way that the outer edges are behind the central part; opposite procurved
- Retrolateral: Viewed from above or below, the side of a leg or pedipalp furthest from the mouth, i.e. the side facing backwards; opposite prolateral
- Retrolateral tibial apophysis: A backward-facing projection on the tibia of the male pedipalp; distinguishing feature of the RTA clade
- Retromarginal: The side of the cheliceral furrow facing backward (towards the posterior end of the spider); particularly used for describing teeth; opposite promarginal
- Rostrum (also called labrum): A component (the "upper lip") of the mouthparts, concealed by the chelicerae; see also Arthropod mouthparts: Labrum

=== S ===
- Scape: An elongated process or appendage of some epigyne
- Sclerite: A single hardened (sclerotized) part of the external covering (tegument, exoskeleton)
- Scopula (plural scopulae): A brush of hairs (setae); called a claw tuft when on the end of the foot (tarsus), where it improves adhesion
- Scutum (plural scuta): A hardened (sclerotized) plate on the abdomen of some spiders
- Secondary eye: An eye belonging to the three pairs – anterior lateral eyes (ALE), posterior median eyes (PME) and posterior lateral eyes (PLE) – that are primarily movement detectors and have the light-detecting units (rhabdomeres) pointing away from the source; see main eye, eyes

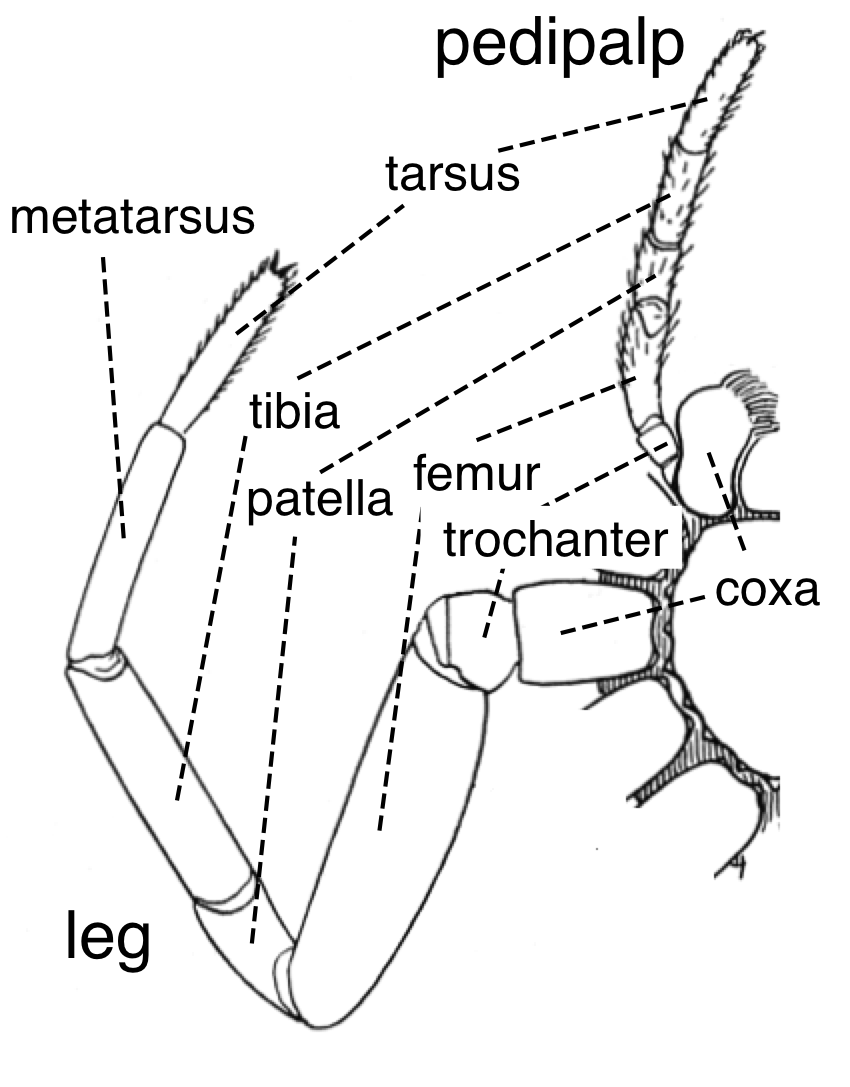
Pedipalp and leg of a female spider from the underside; the coxa of the pedipalp is heavily modified to form the maxilla

- Segments or articles of the legs and pedipalps:

- Coxa (plural coxae): First leg segment, between body and trochanter; the coxa of the pedipalp is heavily modified to form the maxilla or endite

- Trochanter: Second leg segment, between coxa and femur

- Femur (plural femora): Third leg segment, between trochanter and patella

- Patella (plural patellae): Fourth leg segment, between femur and tibia

- Tibia (plural tibiae): Fifth leg segment, between patella and metatarsus

- Metatarsus (plural metatarsi; also called basitarsus): Sixth leg segment, between tibia and tarsus; absent in the pedipalp

- Tarsus (plural tarsi; also called telotarsus): Seventh (last) leg segment, after the metatarsus

- Serrula: A row of tiny teeth along the edge of the maxilla
- Seta (plural setae): A bristle; spiders have a variety of hair-like structures of increasing size that are referred to as hairs, bristles (setae) or spines
- Sigillum (plural sigilla): A circular indentation on the outside of the spider, showing where an internal muscle is attached; particularly on the sternum in some Mygalomorphae and on the dorsum in some Araneomorphae
- Sperm duct: A duct in the male palpal bulb used to store sperm
- Spermatheca (plural spermathecae; also called receptulacum, receptulacum seminis): A structure in the abdomen of female spiders used to store sperm after insemination and before fertilization; see also Spermatheca
- Spigot: A small pointed or cylindrical structure at the tip of a spinneret from which silk emerges
- Spine: A pointed, rigid structure on body and legs, usually with a basal joint; spiders have a variety of hair-like structures of increasing size that are referred to as hairs, bristles (setae) or spines
- Spinneret: An appendage borne on the abdomen, typically one of six arranged in three pairs: anterior (anterior median, AMS), median (posterior median, PMS) and posterior (posterior lateral, PLS); silk emerges from small spigots on the spinnerets; see also Spinneret
- Sternum: The lower (ventral) portion of the cephalothorax
- Stridulating organ: A series of thin ridges on a hardened part of the body; rubbing this with a matching series of short, stiff bristles (setae) elsewhere on the body creates a sound
- Subadult: A spider in the last stage of development (penultimate instar) before becoming a sexually mature adult
- Subtegulum: see palpal bulb

=== T ===
- Tapetum (plural tapeta): A light-reflecting layer in a secondary eye making the eye appear pale
- Tarsal claw (claw): One of a set of claws at the tip of the tarsus; there may be a single pair, often concealed in a claw tuft, or an additional third central claw, much smaller than the other two
- Tarsal organ: a small pit, usually spherical and on the dorsal surface of each tarsus, believed to respond to humidity
- Tarsus: see segments
- Teeth: Pointed growths or bumps along the margins of the cheliceral furrow
- Tegulum: see palpal bulb
- Thoracic furrow: see fovea
- Tibia: see segments
- Trachea (plural tracheae): A thin hardened internal tube, part of the respiratory system in many araneomorph spiders; opens on the underside of the abdomen via a tracheal spiracle; see Trachea § Invertebrates
- Trichobothrium (plural trichobothria): A slender hair-like structure of variable length on the legs and pedipalps, arising from a special socket; used to detect air movements, including sounds; see seta, spine
- Trochanter: see segments

=== U ===
- Unidentate: Having a single tooth

=== V ===
- Venter (or ventrum): The lower (ventral) portion or surface of the body or abdomen; the adjective ventral may be applied to the lower portion or surface of any part of the body; see dorsum
- Vulva: The internal copulatory organs of a female spider, including the copulatory ducts, spermathecae, and fertilization ducts

== Abbreviations ==
Some abbreviations commonly found in descriptions of spider anatomy include:

- ALE: anterior lateral eyes → eyes
- ALS: anterior lateral spinnerets → spinneret
- AME: anterior median eyes → eyes
- DTA: dorsal tegular apophysis, apophysis on the back of the tegulum
- DTiA: dorsal tibial apophysis, apophysis on the back of a tibia
- ITC: inferior tarsal claw → tarsal claw
- LTA: lateral tegular apophysis, apophysis on the side of the tegulum
- MOQ: median ocular quadrangle, the quadrangle formed by the four median eyes, → eyes
- PLE: posterior lateral eyes → eyes
- PLS: posterior lateral spinnerets → spinneret
- PME: posterior median eyes → eyes
- PMS: posterior median spinnerets → spinneret
- RCF: retrolateral cymbial fold, fold on the retrolateral surface of the cymbium
- RTA: retrolateral tibial apophysis, apophysis on the retrolateral surface of a tibia
- STC: superior tarsal claw → tarsal claw
- VTA: ventral tegular apophysis, apophysis on the underside of the tegulum
- VTiA: ventral tibial apophysis, apophysis on the lower surface of a tibia

== See also ==
- Anatomical terms of location
- Glossary of arthropod cuticle
- Glossary of entomology terms
- Spider anatomy

== Bibliography ==
- Comstock, John Henry (1920) [First published 1912]. The Spider Book. Doubleday, Page & Company.
- Foelix, Rainer F. (2011). Biology of Spiders (3rd p/b ed.). Oxford University Press. ISBN 978-0-19-973482-5.
- Jocqué, R. & Dippenaar-Schoeman, A.S. (2007). Spider Families of the World (PDF) (2nd ed.). Tervuren (Belgium): Royal Museum for Central Africa.
- Roberts, Michael J. (1995). Spiders of Britain & Northern Europe. London: HarperCollins. ISBN 978-0-00-219981-0.
- Saaristo, M.I. (2010). "Araneae". In Gerlach, J. & Marusik, Y. (eds.). Arachnida and Myriapoda of the Seychelles Islands. Manchester, UK: Siri Scientific Press. pp. 8–306. ISBN 978-0-9558636-8-4.
- Smith, A.M. (1990). Baboon spiders: Tarantulas of Africa and the Middle East. London: Fitzgerald Publishing.
- Ubick, Darrell; Paquin, Pierre; Cushing, Paula E.; Roth, Vincent, eds. (2009). Spiders of North America: An Identification Manual (1st ed.). American Arachnological Society. ISBN 978-0977143900.
