= Miranha =

Miranha may refer to:

- Miranha (cicada), a genus of cicadas
- Miranha people, or Bora, an ethnic group of the Amazon
- Miranha language, or Bora, their language

== See also ==
- Mirania (spider), or Perania, a genus of spiders
