= Pacullidae =

Pacullidae Temporal range: Cenomanian–Recent

Scientific classification
- Kingdom: Animalia
- Phylum: Arthropoda
- Subphylum: Chelicerata
- Class: Arachnida
- Order: Araneae
- Infraorder: Araneomorphae
- Family: Pacullidae; Simon, 1894

Diversity
- 4 genera, 38 species
- blue: reported countries (WSC)

Family of spiders

Pacullidae is a family of araneomorph spiders first described by Eugène Simon in 1894. It was merged into Tetrablemmidae in 1958, then raised back to family status after a large phylogenetic study in 2017.

== Description ==
The family Pacullidae contains three-clawed spiders with six eyes, lacking a cribellum. They resemble spiders from the family Tetrablemmidae in some respects but are much larger, always exceeding 5 mm long, have a very wrinkled (rugose) cuticle, and females do not have large membranous receptacles.

== Phylogeny ==
Pacullidae falls within the Synspermiata clade, a clade of former haplogyne spiders with "synsperm" – encapsulated groups of 2–4 fused sperm cells. Within this clade, it groups with four other families, including Tetrablemmidae, but is distinct from the latter, being most closely related to Diguetidae. Together with Pholcidae, these four families are placed in the "lost trachea clade", a group of families that have lost their posterior respiratory system.

- "Lost trachea clade"
  - - Tetrablemmidae
    - - Plectreuridae
      - - Diguetidae
        - Pacullidae
  - Pholcidae

== Genera ==
As of January 2026, this family includes four genera and 38 species:

- Lamania Lehtinen, 1981 – Southeast Asia, Bali, Borneo
- Paculla Simon, 1887 – Malaysia, Singapore, New Guinea
- Perania Thorell, 1890 – China, Southeast Asia
- Sabahya Deeleman-Reinhold, 1980 – Borneo

=== Extinct ===
- †Furcembolus Wunderlich 2008 9 spp, Burmese amber, Myanmar, Cenomanian
