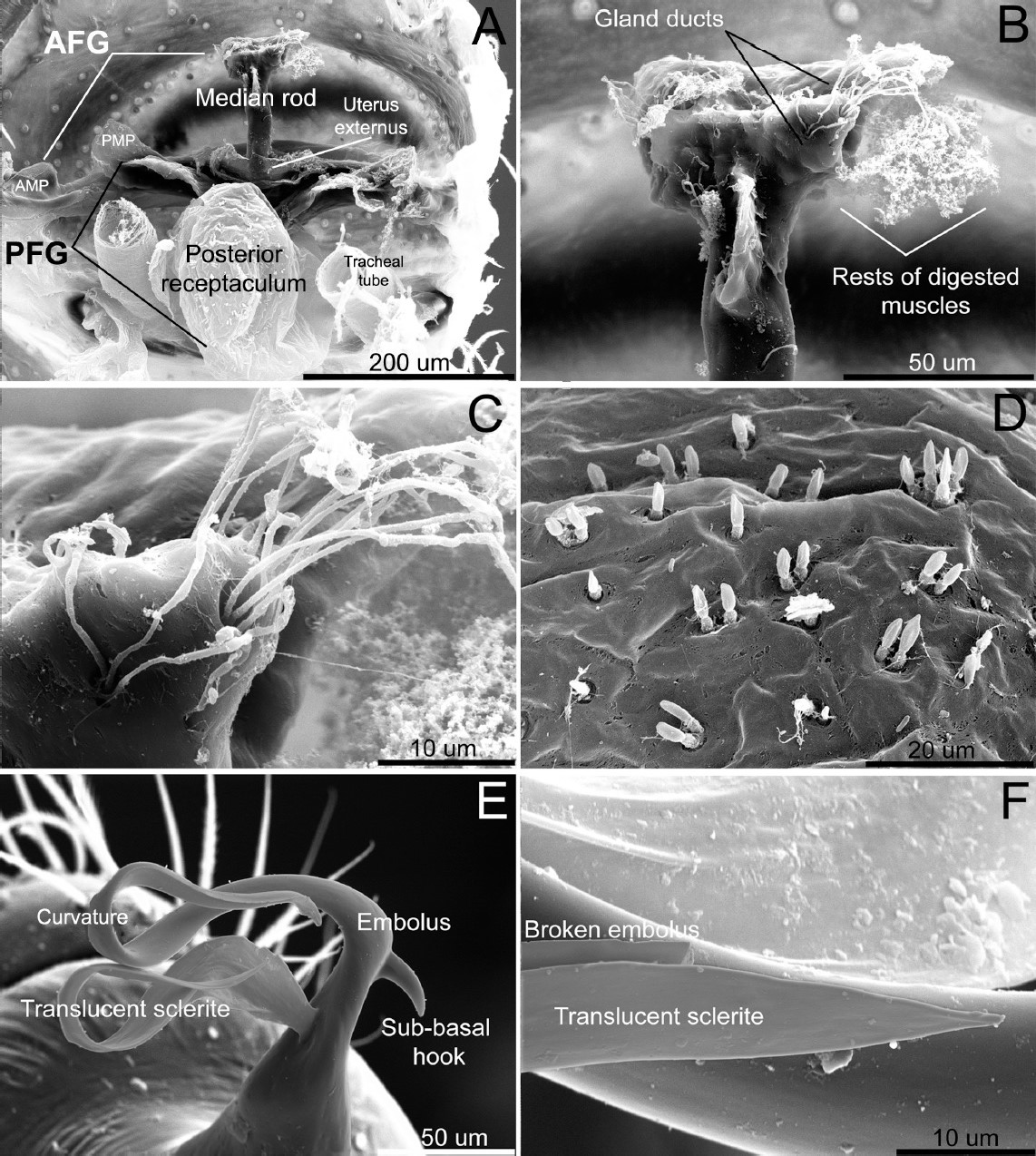
- Male and female genitalia

Scientific classification
- Kingdom: Animalia
- Phylum: Arthropoda
- Subphylum: Chelicerata
- Class: Arachnida
- Order: Araneae
- Infraorder: Araneomorphae
- Family: Oonopidae
- Genus: Unicorn
- Species: U. catleyi

Binomial name
- Unicorn catleyi Platnick & Brescovit, 1995

= Unicorn catleyi =

Species of spider

Unicorn catleyi is a species of spider in the family Oonopidae, found in Chile and Argentina.
