= Paculla =

Scientific classification
- Kingdom: Animalia
- Phylum: Arthropoda
- Subphylum: Chelicerata
- Class: Arachnida
- Order: Araneae
- Infraorder: Araneomorphae
- Family: Pacullidae
- Genus: Paculla; Simon, 1887

Type species
- P. granulosa (Thorell, 1881)

Species
- 8, see text

Genus of spiders

Paculla is a genus of araneomorph spiders in the family Pacullidae that was first described by Eugène Louis Simon in 1887. Originally placed with the Tetrablemmidae, it was transferred to the Pacullidae after a 2017 genetic study.

== Species ==
As of September 2019 it contains eight species, found in Indonesia, Malaysia, Singapore, and Papua New Guinea:

- Paculla bukittimahensis Lin & Li, 2017 – Singapore
- Paculla cameronensis Shear, 1978 – Malaysia
- Paculla globosa Lin & Li, 2017 – Singapore
- Paculla granulosa (Thorell, 1881) (type) – New Guinea
- Paculla mului Bourne, 1981 – Borneo
- Paculla negara Shear, 1978 – Malaysia
- Paculla sulaimani Lehtinen, 1981 – Malaysia
- Paculla wanlessi Bourne, 1981 – Borneo
