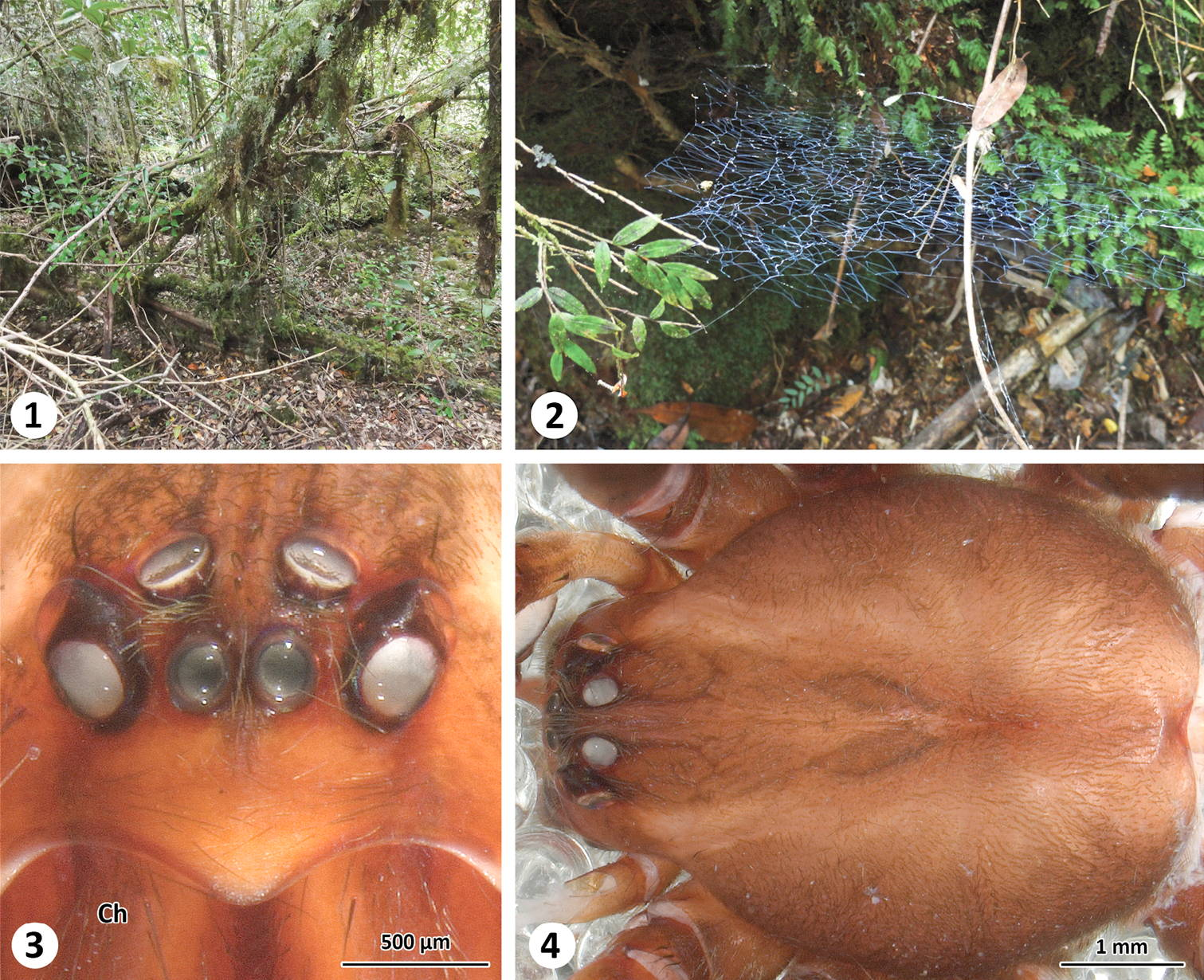
- 1 – habitat; 2 – web; 3 – frontal view of cephalothorax, showing eyes; 4 – dorsal view of cephalothorax

Scientific classification
- Kingdom: Animalia
- Phylum: Arthropoda
- Subphylum: Chelicerata
- Class: Arachnida
- Order: Araneae
- Infraorder: Araneomorphae
- Family: Austrochilidae
- Genus: Thaida
- Species: T. chepu

Binomial name
- Thaida chepu Platnick, 1987

= Thaida chepu =

Species of spider

Thaida chepu is a species of spider in the family Austrochilidae, found in Chile.
