= Sabahya =

Scientific classification
- Kingdom: Animalia
- Phylum: Arthropoda
- Subphylum: Chelicerata
- Class: Arachnida
- Order: Araneae
- Infraorder: Araneomorphae
- Family: Pacullidae
- Genus: Sabahya; Deeleman-Reinhold, 1980

Type species
- S. kinabaluana Deeleman-Reinhold, 1980

Species
- S. bispinosa Deeleman-Reinhold, 1980 – Borneo; S. kinabaluana Deeleman-Reinhold, 1980 – Borneo

Genus of spiders

Sabahya is a genus of Indonesian araneomorph spiders in the family Pacullidae that was first described by Christa Laetitia Deeleman-Reinhold in 1980. As of September 2019 it contains two species, found on Borneo: S. bispinosa and S. kinabaluana. Originally placed with the Tetrablemmidae, it was moved to the Pacullidae after a 2017 genetic study.
