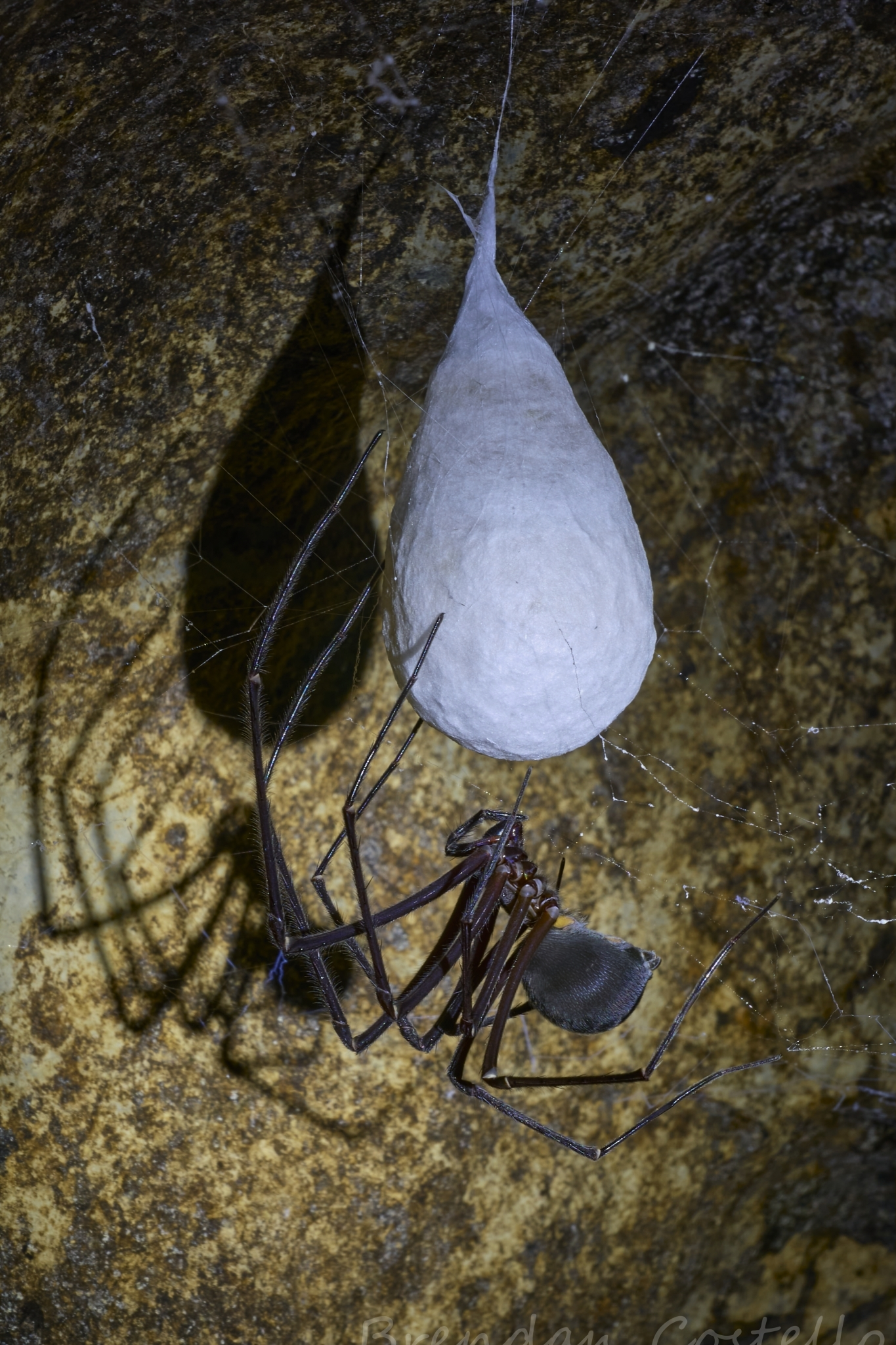
- female H. troglodytes with egg sac

Scientific classification
- Kingdom: Animalia
- Phylum: Arthropoda
- Subphylum: Chelicerata
- Class: Arachnida
- Order: Araneae
- Infraorder: Araneomorphae
- Family: Gradungulidae
- Genus: Hickmania; Gertsch, 1958
- Species: H. troglodytes

Binomial name
- Hickmania troglodytes (Higgins & Petterd, 1883)
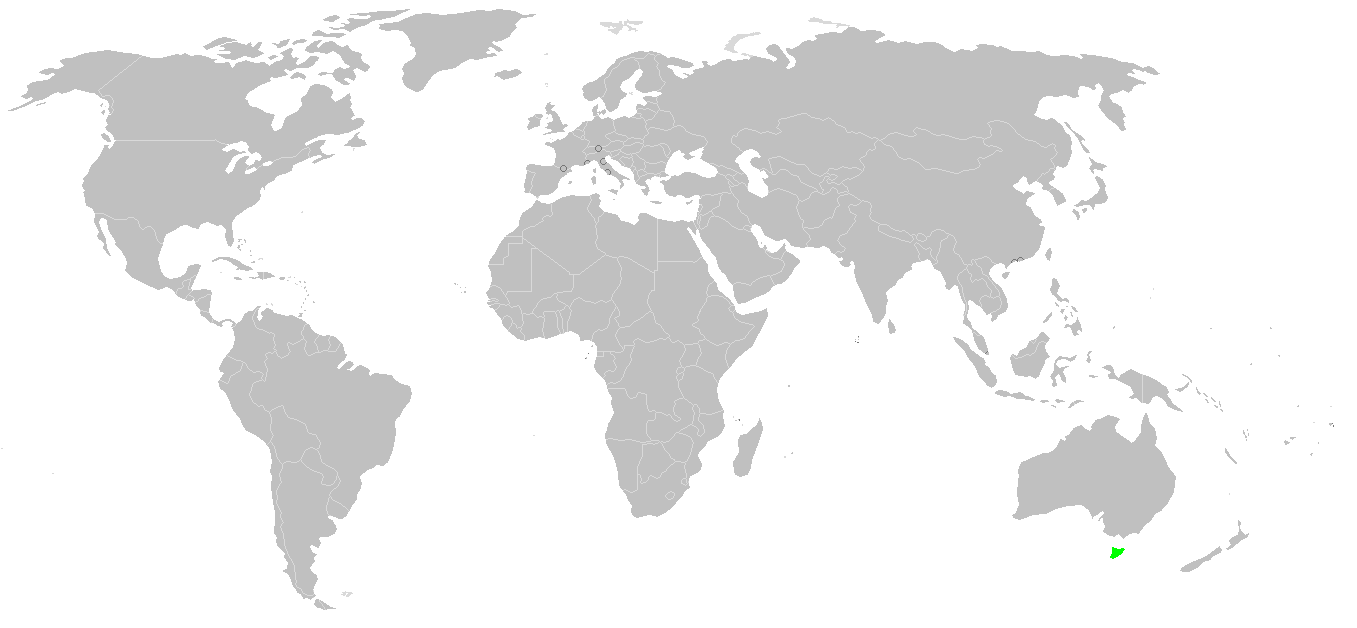

Synonyms
- Theridion troglodytes Higgins & Petterd, 1883; Ectatostica troglodytes (Higgins & Petterd, 1883); Ectatosticta australis Simon, 1902

= Hickmania =

Tasmanian cave spider

Genus of spiders

Hickmania is a monotypic genus of Australian cribellate araneomorph spiders in the family Gradungulidae, containing only the Tasmanian cave spider (Hickmania troglodytes).

The genus was first described by Willis J. Gertsch in 1958, and has been found only in Tasmania. It had been thought to be an ancient Gondwanan lineage, long since separated from its closest relatives in South America in the family Austrochilidae, but more recent data show it belongs to the Australia–New Zealand family Gradungulidae.

It is an icon species for faunal conservation in Tasmania, and is named in honor of V. V. Hickman, a professor at the University of Tasmania, who specialized in spiders. The species name is derived from the Ancient Greek τρωγλοδύτης (troglodytes), meaning "cave-dweller".

== Description ==
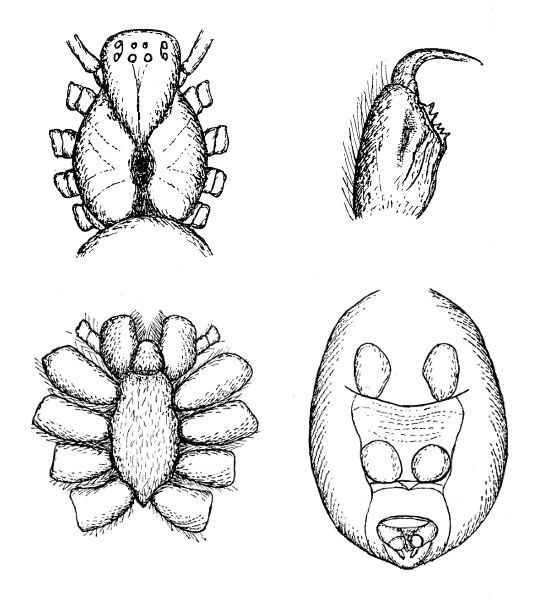
Diagnostic drawings

Tasmanian cave spiders have red to brown carapaces and duller, darker brown opisthosomae. They can grow up to 1.3 to 2 centimetres (0.51 to 0.79 in) long, and can have a legspan of up to 18 centimetres (7.1 in). These primitive spiders use book lungs to breathe, seen as four light patches beneath the abdomen.

Males are smaller than females, and have a distinct kink-like curve near the end of each second leg used to hold the female's head while mating.

Neural arrangement in the pedipalps of male H. troglodytes is almost identical to the neural arrangement in the pedipalps of male running crab spiders Philodromus cespitum.

Tasmanian cave spiders are widely distributed throughout Tasmania, found in many dark, cool areas, including underground drainage and cave systems, the underside of bridges, and inside hollow logs. They build sheet webs up to 1 metre (3 ft 3 in) in diameter, and hang beneath it waiting for prey to fly or jump into their web. They have an unusually long lifetime for araneomorph spiders, sometimes living several decades.
