= Lamania =

Scientific classification
- Kingdom: Animalia
- Phylum: Arthropoda
- Subphylum: Chelicerata
- Class: Arachnida
- Order: Araneae
- Infraorder: Araneomorphae
- Family: Pacullidae
- Genus: Lamania; Lehtinen, 1981

Type species
- L. nirmala Lehtinen, 1981

Species
- 8, see text

Genus of spiders

Lamania is a genus of Southeast Asian araneomorph spiders in the family Pacullidae that was first described by Pekka T. Lehtinen in 1981. Originally placed with the armored spiders, it was moved to the Pacullidae in 2017.

== Species ==
As of September 2019 it contains eight species, found in Malaysia, Thailand, Cambodia, and Indonesia:

- Lamania bernhardi (Deeleman-Reinhold, 1980) – Borneo
- Lamania bokor Schwendinger & Košulič, 2015 – Cambodia
- Lamania gracilis Schwendinger, 1989 – Bali
- Lamania inornata (Deeleman-Reinhold, 1980) – Borneo
- Lamania kraui (Shear, 1978) – Thailand, Malaysia
- Lamania lipsae Dierkens, 2011 – Borneo
- Lamania nirmala Lehtinen, 1981 (type) – Borneo
- Lamania sheari (Brignoli, 1980) – Indonesia (Sulawesi)
