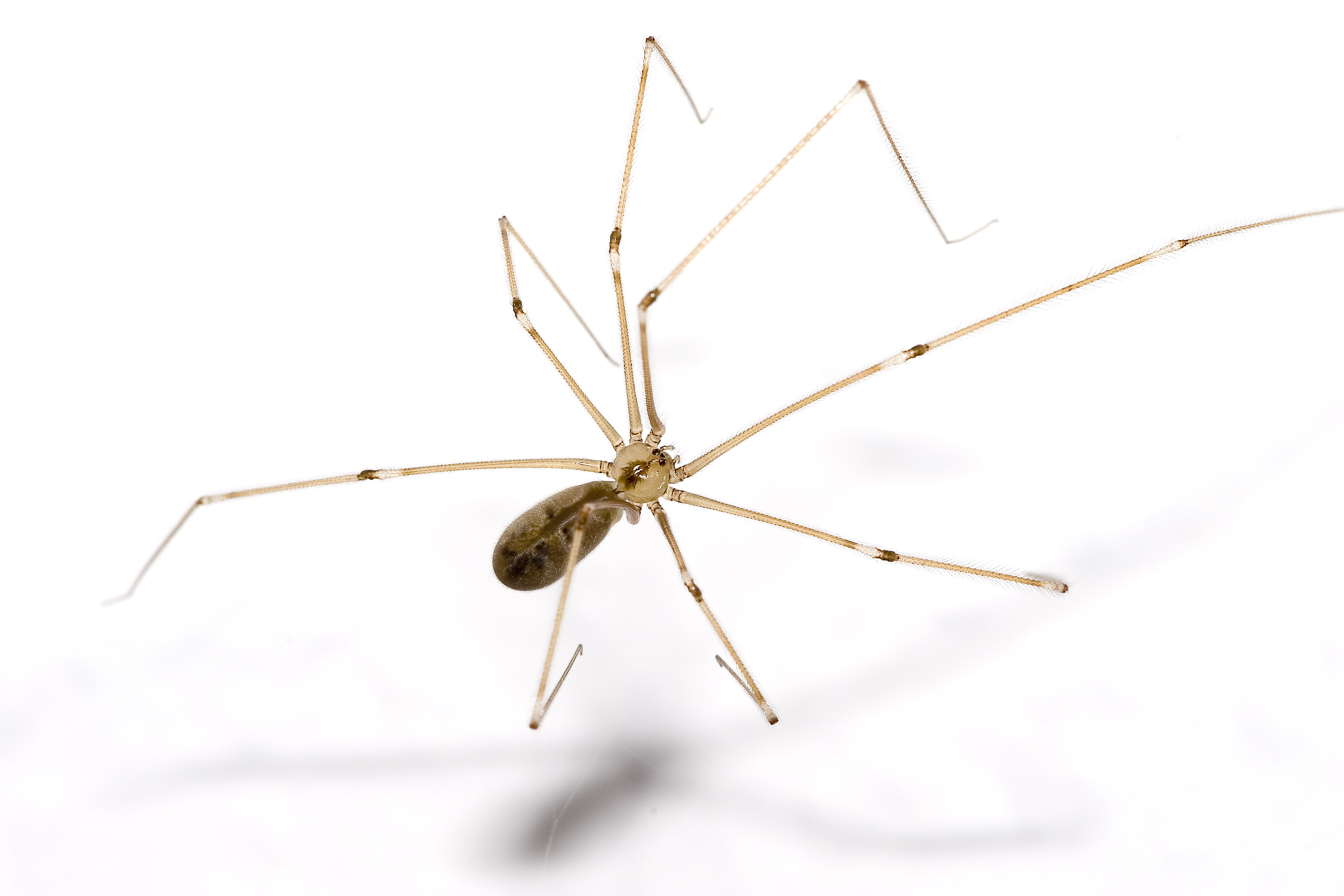
- Pholcus phalangioides (Pholcidae)

Scientific classification
- Kingdom: Animalia
- Phylum: Arthropoda
- Subphylum: Chelicerata
- Class: Arachnida
- Order: Araneae
- Infraorder: Araneomorphae
- Clade: Synspermiata

Families
- See text.

= Synspermiata =

Synspermiata Temporal range: Jurassic–present

Clade of spiders

Synspermiata is a clade of araneomorph spiders, comprising most of the former "haplogynes". They are united by having simpler genitalia than other araneomorph spiders, lacking a cribellum, and sharing an evolutionary history of synspermia – a particular way in which spermatozoa are grouped together when transferred to the female.

== Synspermia ==
Spermatozoa are produced in a multi-step process. A primary spermatocyte with the full diploid number of chromosomes divides to form two secondary spermatocytes which are haploid, i.e., each has half the diploid number of chromosomes. Each secondary spermatocyte then divides to produce two spermatids which undergo further development to form spermatozoa. In synspermia, two or more spermatids from the same spermatocyte fuse together and are enclosed in an envelope, forming a "capsule". This contrasts with cleistospermia, where the capsules enclose individual spermatozoa. After transfer to the female in either form, decapsulation and activation are necessary before the resulting spermatozoa can fertilize eggs.

== Phylogeny ==
In 2014, Peter Michalik and Martín Ramírez published a study of the morphology of the reproductive system of male spiders, including their spermatozoa. They found a clade within haplogyne spiders, Synspermatia, characterized by the absence of a cribellum and the synapomorphy (shared derived character) of synspermia. Not all members of the clade exhibit synspermia, since it has evolved into cleistospermia multiple times and Telemidae have individually encapsulated sperm cells arranged in densely packed stacks.

A much larger molecular phylogenetic study published in 2016 also found Synspermatia to be a clade, grouping with the families Hypochilidae and Filistatidae at the base of Araneomorphae:

- Araneomorphae
  - - - Hypochilidae
      - Filistatidae
    - Synspermiata
  - all other araneomorph spiders

== Families ==
Families placed in Synspermiata are:

- Caponiidae
- Diguetidae
- Drymusidae
- Dysderidae
- Ochyroceratidae
- Oonopidae
- Orsolobidae
- Pacullidae
- Periegopidae
- Pholcidae
- Plectreuridae
- Scytodidae
- Segestriidae
- Sicariidae
- Telemidae
- Tetrablemmidae
- Trogloraptoridae

=== Extinct families ===
†Eopsilodercidae

(Telemidae was not included in the analysis by Wheeler et al., but is placed in Synspermiata in other studies.
