= Austrochilus =

Scientific classification
- Kingdom: Animalia
- Phylum: Arthropoda
- Subphylum: Chelicerata
- Class: Arachnida
- Order: Araneae
- Infraorder: Araneomorphae
- Family: Austrochilidae
- Genus: Austrochilus; Gertsch & Zapfe, 1955

Type species
- A. manni Gertsch & Zapfe, 1955

Species
- 7, see text

Genus of spiders

Austrochilus is a genus of South American cribellate araneomorph spiders in the family Austrochilidae, first described by H. Zapfe in 1955.

== Species ==
As of April 2019 it contains seven species in Chile and Argentina:

- Austrochilus forsteri Grismado, Lopardo & Platnick, 2003 – Chile
- Austrochilus franckei Platnick, 1987 – Chile, Argentina
- Austrochilus manni Gertsch & Zapfe, 1955 (type) – Chile
- Austrochilus melon Platnick, 1987 – Chile
- Austrochilus newtoni Platnick, 1987 – Chile
- Austrochilus parwis Michalik & Wunderlich, 2017 – Chile
- Austrochilus schlingeri Platnick, 1987 – Chile
