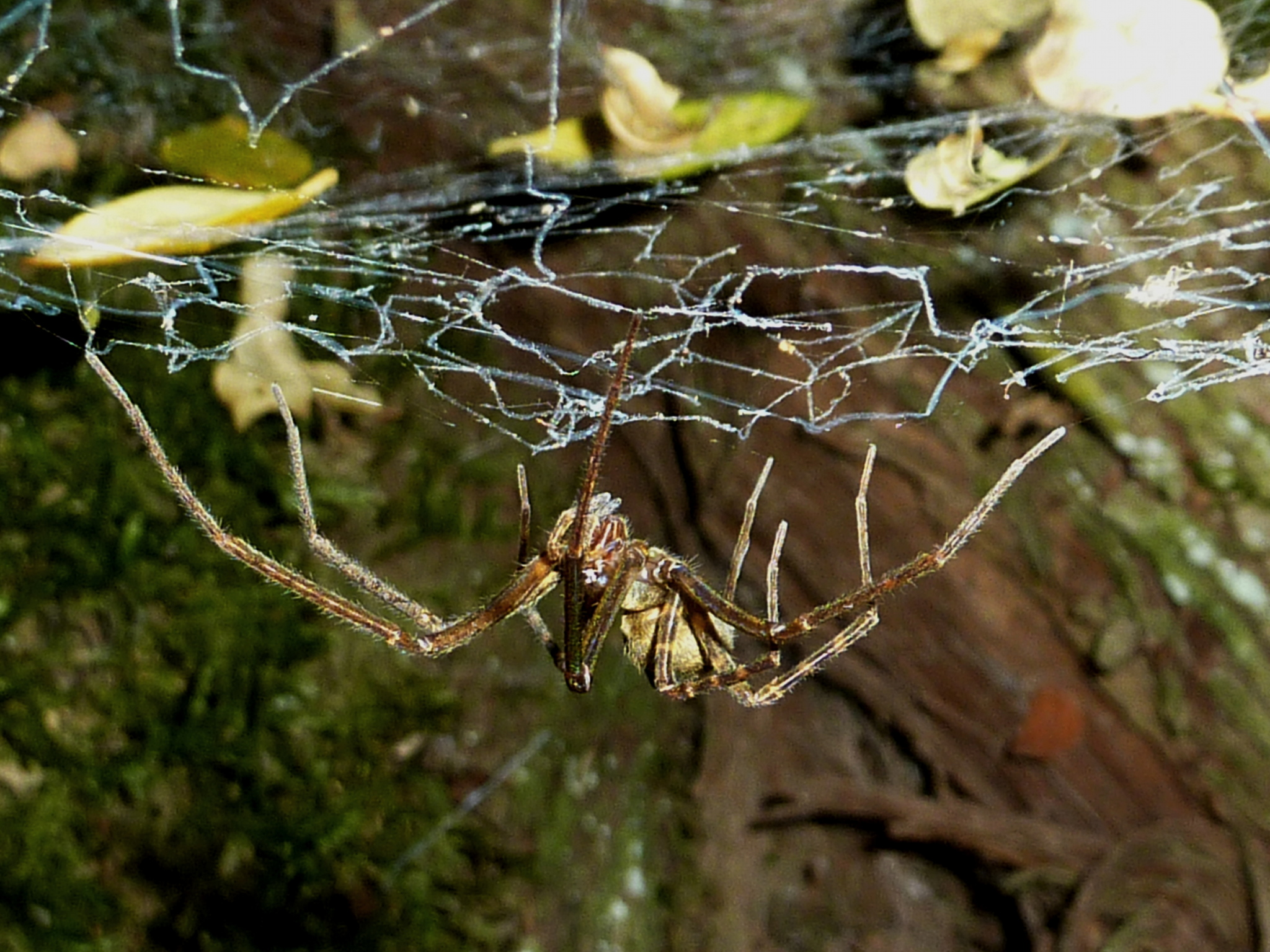
- T. peculiaris

Scientific classification
- Kingdom: Animalia
- Phylum: Arthropoda
- Subphylum: Chelicerata
- Class: Arachnida
- Order: Araneae
- Infraorder: Araneomorphae
- Family: Austrochilidae
- Genus: Thaida; Karsch, 1880

Type species
- T. peculiaris Karsch, 1880

Species
- T. chepu Platnick, 1987; T. peculiaris Karsch, 1880

= Thaida =

Genus of spiders

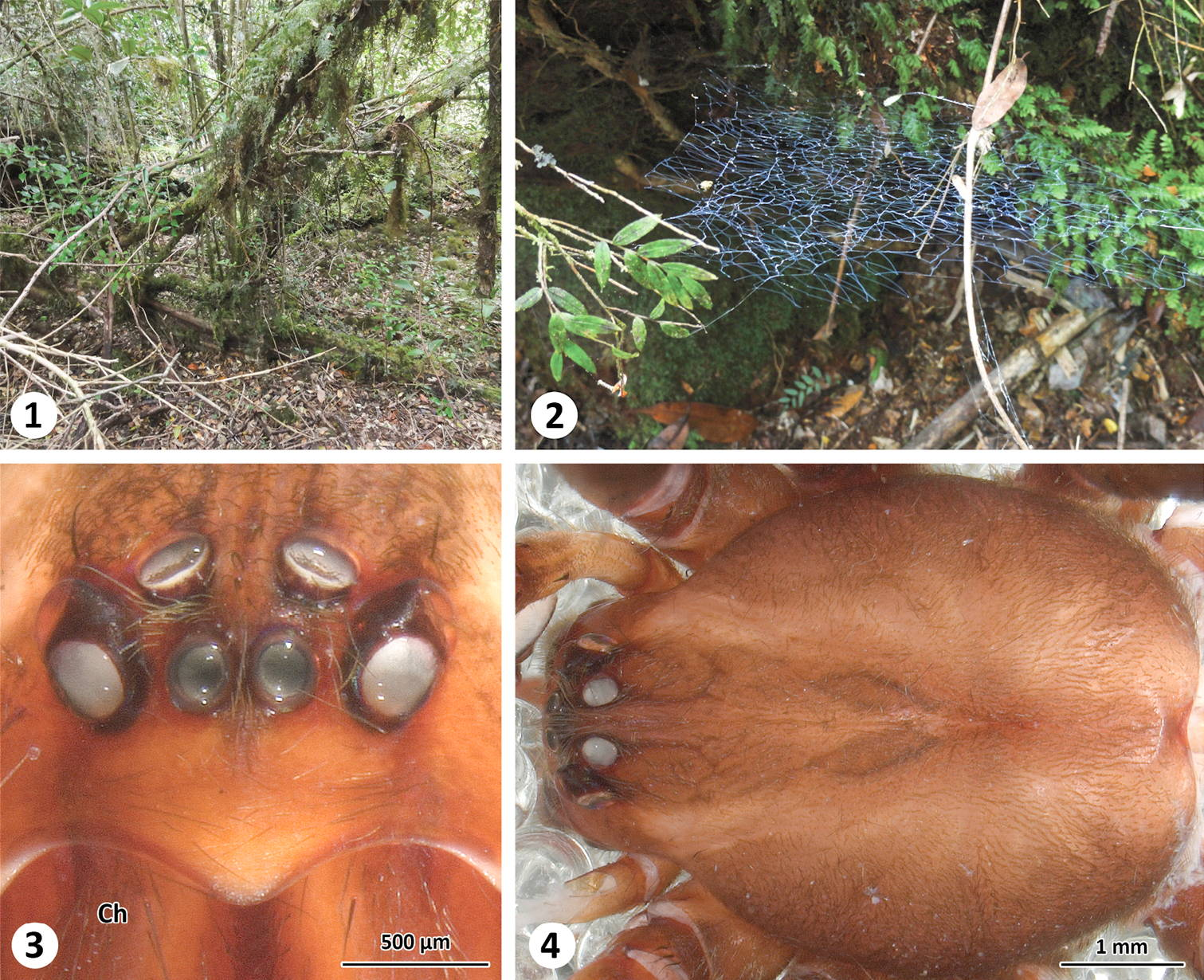
Thaida chepu: 1 – habitat; 2 – web; 3 – frontal view of cephalothorax, showing eyes; 4 – dorsal view of cephalothorax

Thaida is a genus of South American cribellate araneomorph spiders in the family Austrochilidae, first described by Ferdinand Karsch in 1880. Its two described species are found in Chile and Argentina.

== Species ==
As of October 2025, this genus includes two species:

- Thaida chepu Platnick, 1987 – Chile
- Thaida peculiaris Karsch, 1880 – Chile, Argentina (type species)
