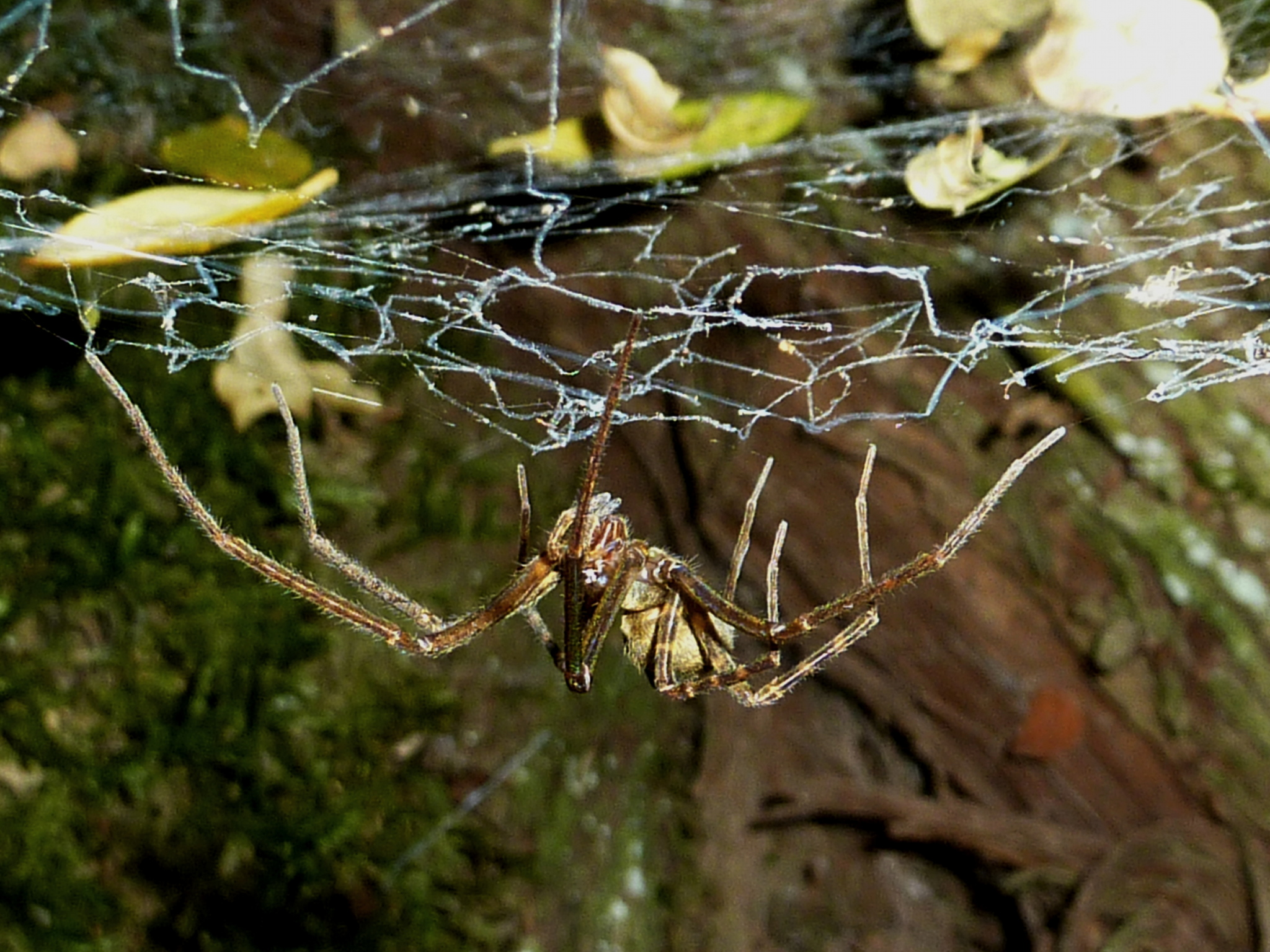
- Thaida peculiaris
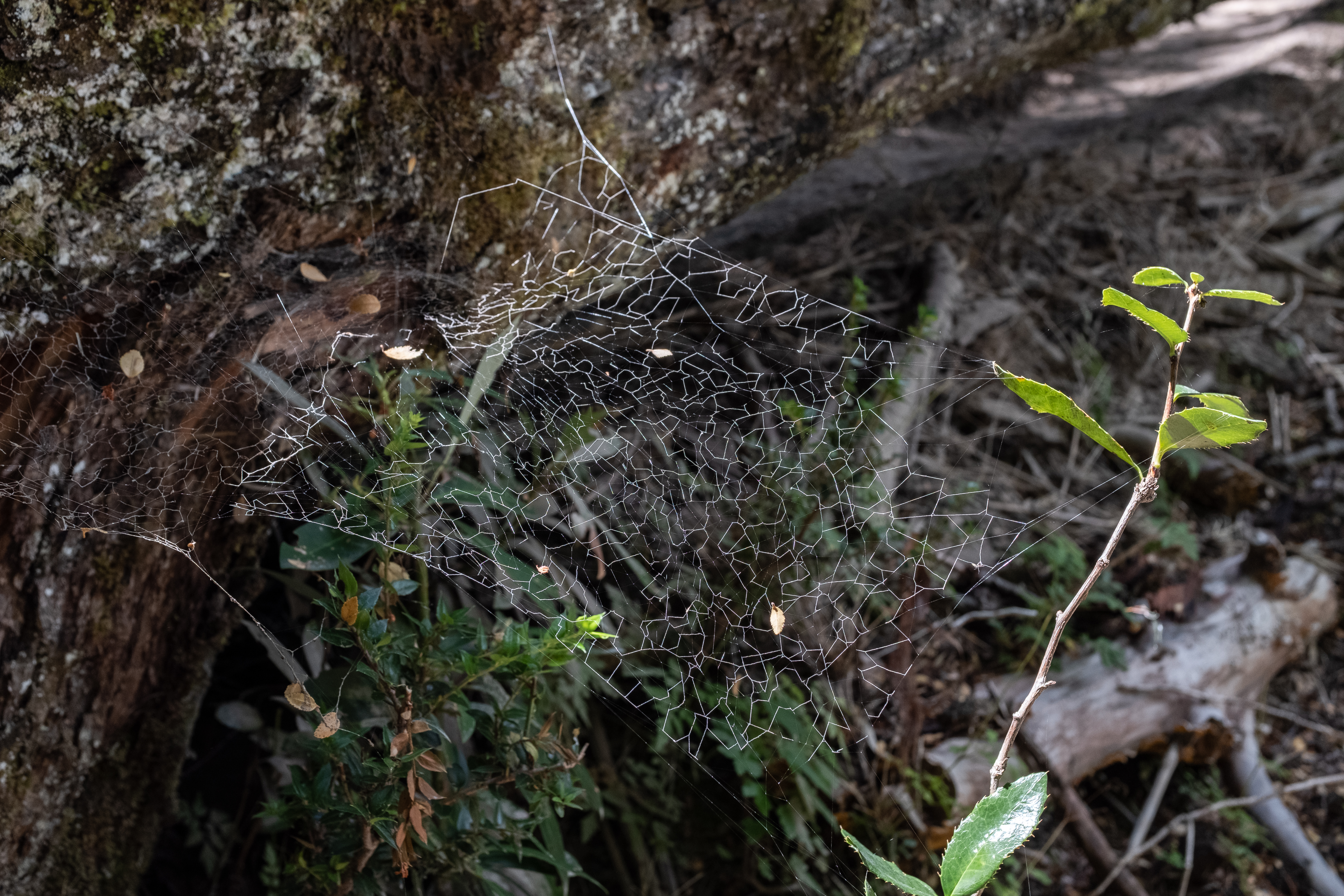
- Web of Austrochilidae species

Scientific classification
- Kingdom: Animalia
- Phylum: Arthropoda
- Subphylum: Chelicerata
- Class: Arachnida
- Order: Araneae
- Infraorder: Araneomorphae
- Family: Austrochilidae; Zapfe, 1955

Genera
- Austrochilus Gertsch & Zapfe, 1955; Thaida Karsch, 1880

Diversity
- 2 genera, 9 species
- blue: reported countries (WSC)

= Austrochilidae =

Family of spiders

Austrochilidae is a small spider family with nine species in two genera. Austrochilus and Thaida are endemic to the Andean forest of central and southern Chile and adjacent Argentina.

== Taxonomy ==
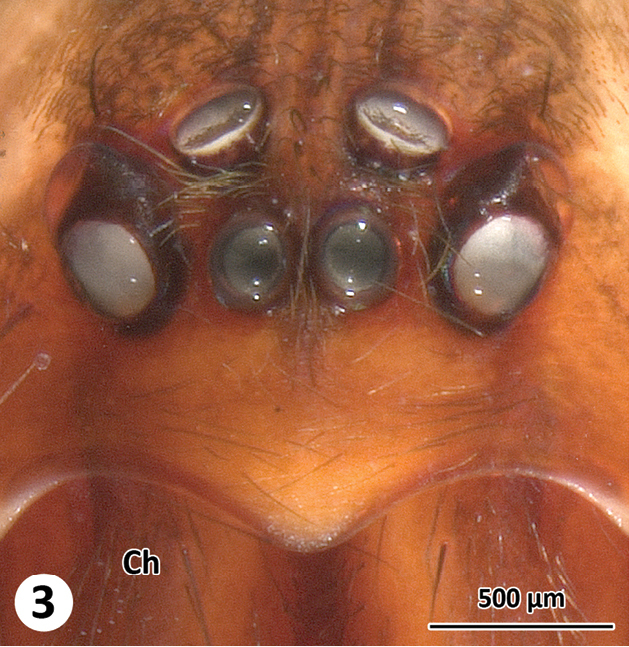
Thaida chepu, male eyes

As of 2026, two genera are placed in the family Austrochilidae: Austrochilus and Thaida, found in Chile and Argentina. The taxonomic placement of these genera has varied.

In 1968, Lehtinen synonymized Austrochilus and Thaida under the latter name, placing the genus in a family he called "Thaididae". However, the family name "Thaididae" is preoccupied, being first used for a family of gastropods in 1887.

A single family was accepted by Forster et al. in 1987, under the name "Austrochilidae". Molecular phylogenetic studies agree in placing the two genera as basal members of the Araneomorphae, although the precise details and the family placement are not yet agreed.

=== Phylogeny ===
One hypothesis for the phylogeny of the genera placed in the family is shown below (Austrochilidae genera in bold). The family shows a mixture of "primitive" and "advanced" features. The retention of four book lungs places the family at the base of the Araneomorphae, whereas some features of their silk production are regarded as derived.

- Araneomorphae
  - Hypochilidae + Filistatidae + Synspermiata
  - - - Archoleptoneta
      - Gradungulidae
    - - - Leptoneta
        - **Austrochilus** + **Thaida**
      - remaining Araneomorphae

== Genera ==
As of January 2026, this family includes two genera and nine species:

- Austrochilus Gertsch & Zapfe, 1955 – Argentina, Chile
- Thaida Karsch, 1880 – Argentina, Chile
