= Perania =

Scientific classification
- Kingdom: Animalia
- Phylum: Arthropoda
- Subphylum: Chelicerata
- Class: Arachnida
- Order: Araneae
- Infraorder: Araneomorphae
- Family: Pacullidae
- Genus: Perania; Thorell, 1890

Type species
- P. nigra (Thorell, 1890)

Species
- 20, see text

Synonyms
- Mirania Lehtinen, 1981

Genus of spiders

Perania is a genus of Asian araneomorph spiders in the family Pacullidae that was first described by Tamerlan Thorell in 1890. It is considered a senior synonym of Mirania.

== Species ==
As of September 2019 it contains twenty species, found in Asia:

- Perania annam Schwendinger & Košulič, 2015 – Vietnam
- Perania armata (Thorell, 1890) – Indonesia (Sumatra)
- Perania birmanica (Thorell, 1898) – Myanmar
- Perania cerastes Schwendinger, 1994 – Malaysia
- Perania coryne Schwendinger, 1994 – Malaysia
- Perania deelemanae Schwendinger, 2013 – Indonesia (Sumatra)
- Perania egregia Schwendinger, 2013 – Thailand
- Perania ferox Schwendinger, 2013 – Thailand
- Perania harau Schwendinger, 2013 – Indonesia (Sumatra)
- Perania korinchica Hogg, 1919 – Indonesia (Sumatra)
- Perania nasicornis Schwendinger, 1994 – Thailand
- Perania nasuta Schwendinger, 1989 – Thailand
- Perania nigra (Thorell, 1890) (type) – Indonesia (Sumatra)
- Perania picea (Thorell, 1890) – Indonesia (Sumatra)
- Perania quadrifurcata Schwendinger, 2013 – Thailand
- Perania robusta Schwendinger, 1989 – China, Thailand
- Perania selatan Schwendinger, 2013 – Indonesia (Sumatra)
- Perania siamensis Schwendinger, 1994 – Thailand
- Perania tumida Schwendinger, 2013 – Thailand
- Perania utara Schwendinger, 2013 – Indonesia (Sumatra)
