= Evolution of spiders =

Origin from a chelicerate ancestor and diversification of spiders through geologic time

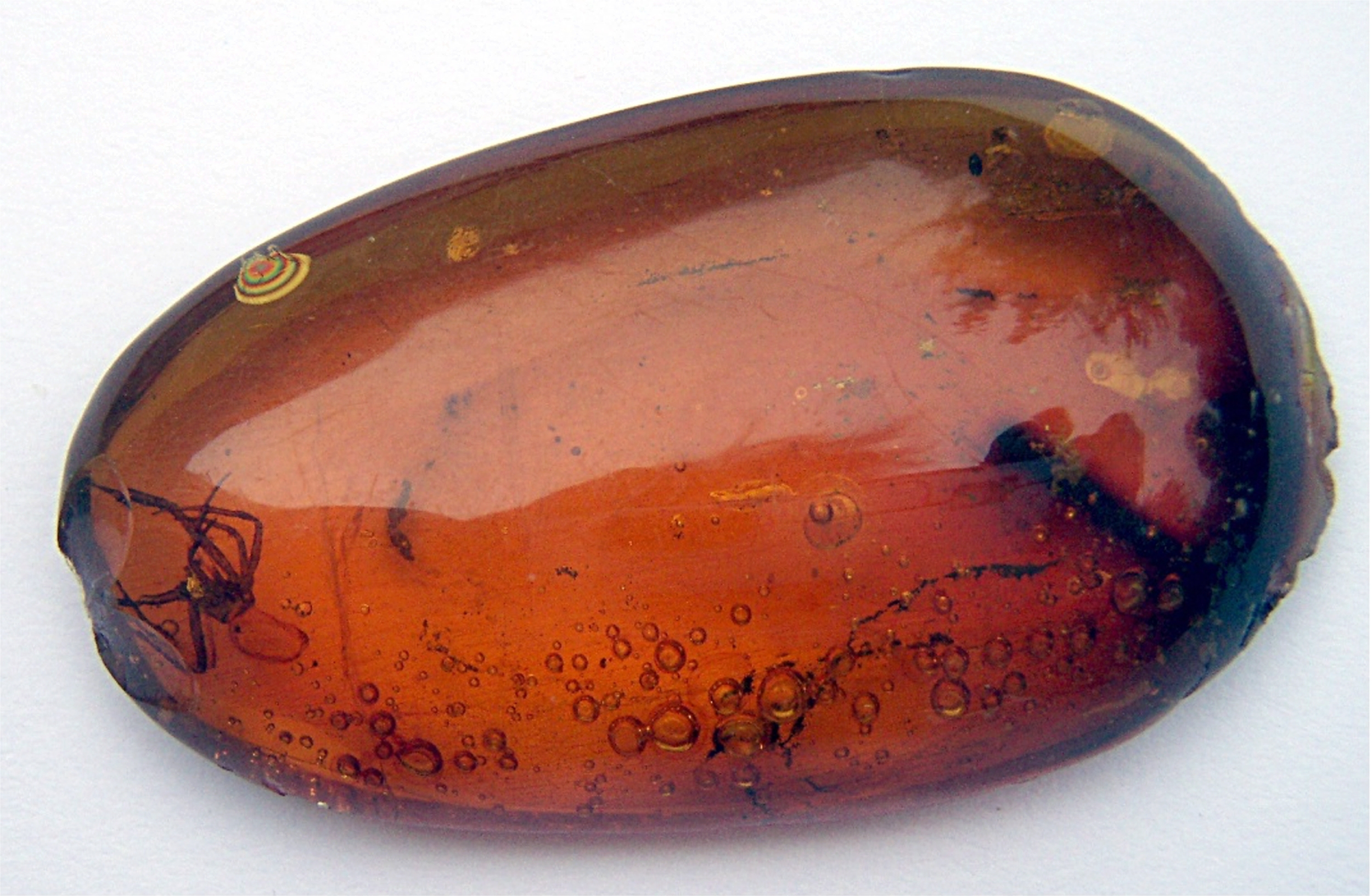
A spider in Baltic amber

Spiders have existed for over 300 million years, with silk-producing forerunners (Uraraneida), extending back around 380 million years. The origins of spiders lie within the arachnid subgroup Tetrapulmonata, defined by the presence of book lungs. The arachnids as a whole evolved from aquatic chelicerate ancestors. More than 45,000 extant species have been described, organised taxonomically in 3,958 genera and 114 families. Some authors have estimated that there may be over 120,000 species of spiders in total. Fossil diversity rates make up a larger proportion than extant diversity would suggest with 1,593 arachnid species described out of 1,952 recognized chelicerates. Both extant and fossil species are described annually by researchers in the field. Major developments in spider evolution include the development of spinnerets and silk secretion.

== Early spider-like arachnids ==
Among the oldest known land arthropods are Trigonotarbids, members of an extinct order of spider-like arachnids.

Trigonotarbids share many superficial characteristics with spiders, including a terrestrial lifestyle, respiration through book lungs, and walking on eight legs, with a pair of leg-like pedipalps near the mouth and mouth parts. They lacked the ability to spin silk: there is no evidence for either spigots or spinnerets within the group. An unpublished fossil exists which has distinct microtubercles on its hind legs, akin to those used by spiders to direct and manipulate their silk, but given the lack of any structures associated with silk production, it seems unlikely the structures were associated with silk.

Trigonotarbids are not true spiders, and the trigonotarbids have no living descendants.

== Emergence of true spiders ==
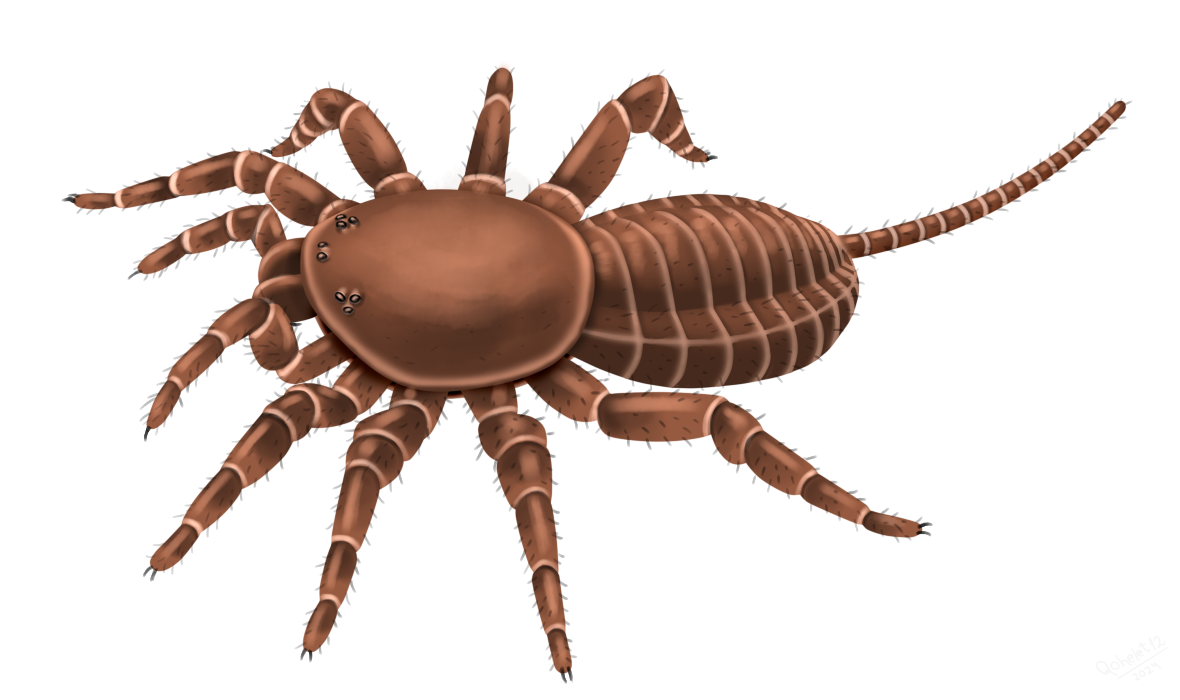
Life restoration of Attercopus, a Devonian (c. 380 Ma) spider-like arachnid belonging to Uraneida which could produce silk but did not have spinnerets

According to a 2020 study using a molecular clock calibrated with 27 chelicerate fossils, spiders most likely diverged from other chelicerates between 375 and 328 million years ago. At one stage, Attercopus was claimed as the oldest fossil spider which lived 380 million years ago during the Devonian. Attercopus was placed as the sister-taxon to all living spiders, but has now been reinterpreted as a member of a separate, extinct order Uraraneida which could produce silk, but did not have true spinnerets. The discovery of Chimerarachne in early Late Cretaceous (Cenomanian) aged Burmese amber has also demonstrated that taxa existed until the Cretaceous that had both spinnerets, and a whip-like telson.

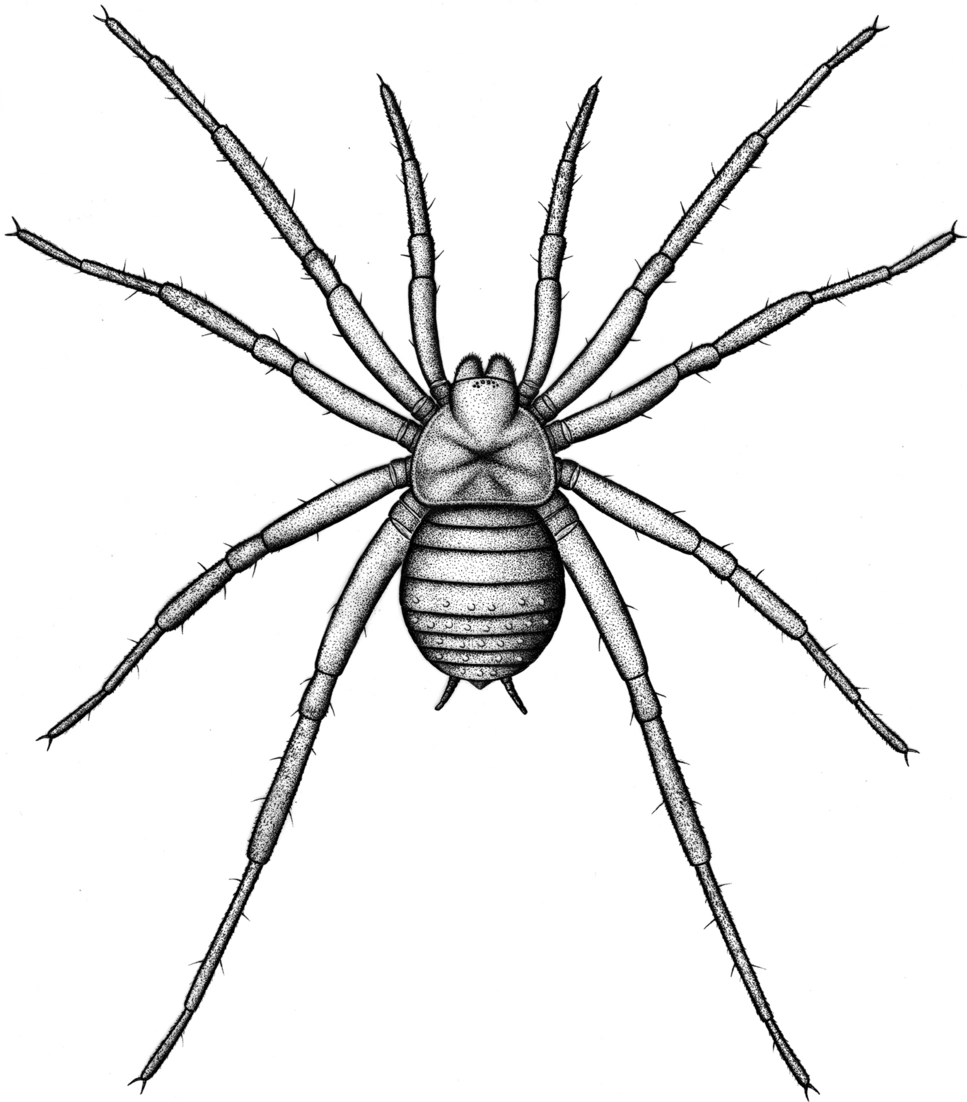
Life restoration of Arthrolycosa one of the oldest known true spiders from the Carboniferous period (c. 300 Ma)

The oldest reported spiders date to the Carboniferous Period, or about 300 million years ago. Most of these early segmented fossil spiders from the Coal Measures of Europe and North America probably belonged to the Mesothelae, or something very similar, a group of spiders with the spinnerets placed underneath the middle of the abdomen, rather than at the end as in modern spiders. They were probably ground-dwelling predators, living in the giant clubmoss and fern forests of the mid-late Palaeozoic, where they were presumably predators of other primitive arthropods. Silk may have been used simply as a protective covering for the eggs, a lining for a retreat hole, and later perhaps for simple ground sheet web and trapdoor construction. They co-existed with a range of spider-like forms which had some, but not all, the characters associated with the true spiders. Megarachne servinei from the late Carboniferous was once thought to be a giant mygalomorph spider and, with its body length of 54 cm (1.8 ft) and leg span of above 50 cm (20 in), the largest known spider ever to have lived on Earth, but subsequent examination revealed that it was actually a relatively small sea scorpion.

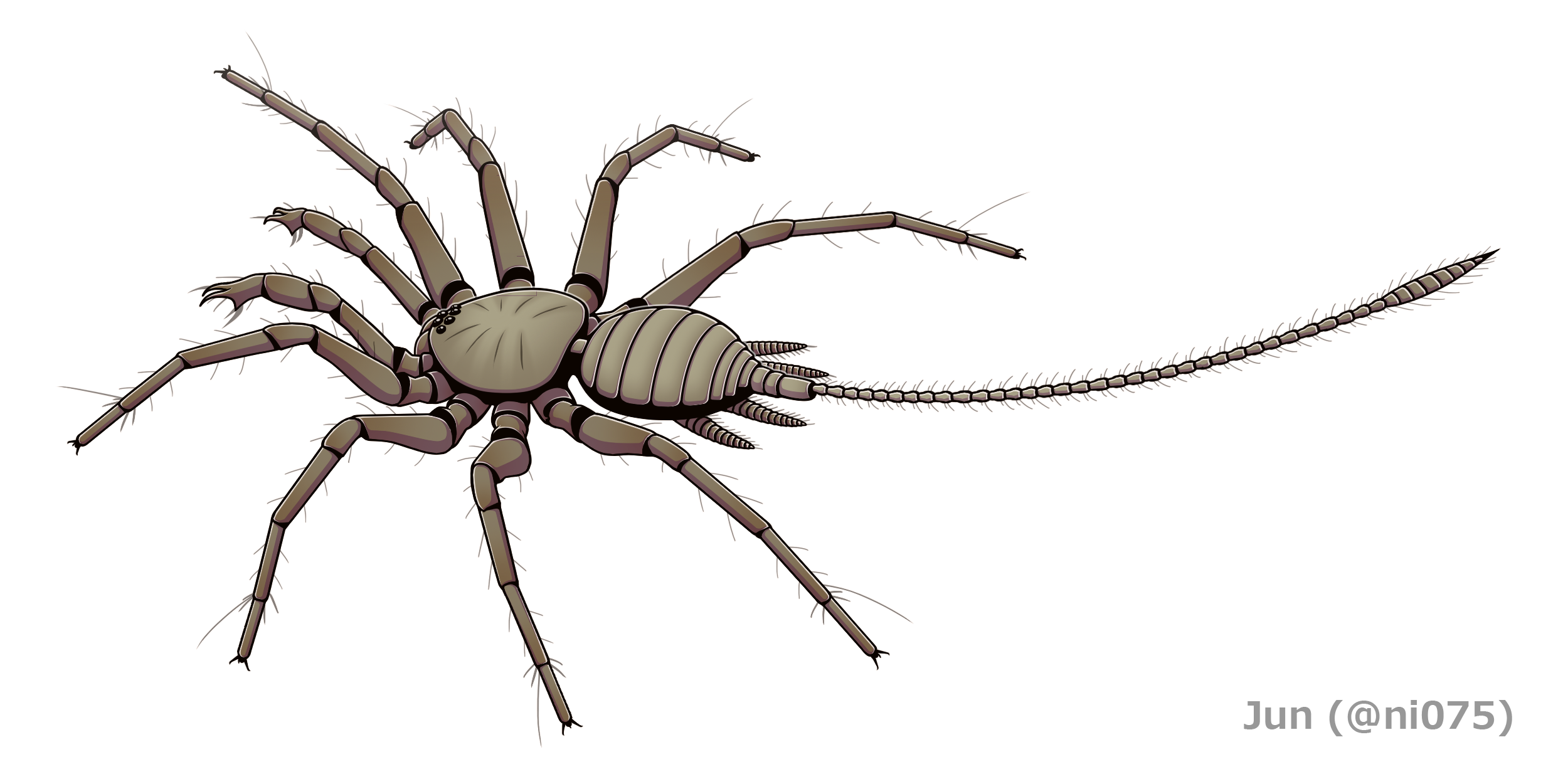
Life restoration of Chimerarachne a stem-group spider known from the Cretaceous period (c. 100 Ma) long after the diversification of living spiders, which unlike uraneids had spinnerets, but retailed an elongate telson unlike modern spiders.

As plant and insect life diversified so also did the spider's use of silk. Spiders with spinnerets at the end of the abdomen (Opisthothelae containing the vast majority of living spiders belonging to two subgroups, Mygalomorphae and the more diverse Araneomorphae), first appear in the fossil record during the Triassic period, though they may have originated somewhat earlier. The oldest mygalomorph and also by extension also oldest member of Opisthothelae, Rosamygale, was described from the Middle Triassic (c. 242 Ma) of France. The oldest araneomorph is Triassaraneus from the Carnian (c. 229-222 Ma) of South Africa.

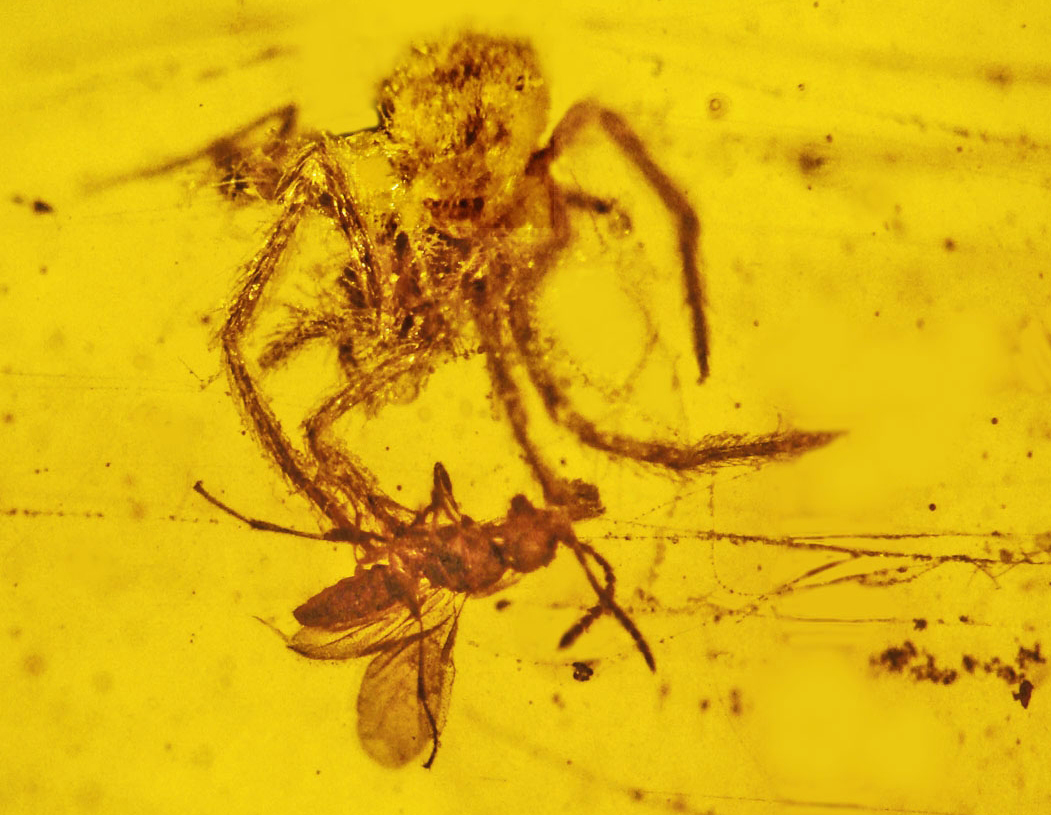
Geratonephila (an orb-weaver) attacking the parasitic wasp Cascoscelio preserved in Cretaceous-aged Burmese amber, c. 100 million years ago.

Opisthotheles, particularly araneomorphs, are estimated to have considerably diversified throughout the Jurassic and Cretaceous periods, though due to the overall fossil record of spiders being poor it is difficult to tell the precise timing of emergence of many major modern spider groups. Seppo koponeni from the Early Jurassic of Germany likely represents an early member of Palpimanoidea or close to the split between the ancestors of Palpimanoidea and Entelegynae. Around half of modern spider species belong to the RTA clade, a group of araneomorph spiders linked by the shared morphological trait of the retrolateral tibial apophysis (RTA) on the male pedipalp. Despite their modern diversity, there is no unambiguous evidence of the clade from the Mesozoic, though molecular clocks suggest that diversification of the group began in the Late Cretaceous. There appears to be a faunal turnover in the Cretaceous-Cenozoic interval, with the Cretaceous dominated by Synspermiata and Palpimanoidea, as well as enigmatic extinct families like the lagonomegopids, while the Cenozoic is dominated by RTA clade and araneoid spiders.

== See also ==
- Spider taxonomy
- Insect evolution
