= Palaeothele =

Palaeothele Temporal range: Stephanian

Scientific classification
- Domain: Eukaryota
- Kingdom: Animalia
- Phylum: Arthropoda
- Subphylum: Chelicerata
- Class: Arachnida
- Order: Araneae
- Suborder: Mesothelae
- Genus: †Palaeothele
- Species: †P. montceauensis

Binomial name
- †Palaeothele montceauensis (Selden, 1996)

Extinct genus of spiders

Palaeothele is an extinct genus of mesothele spiders, with only one known species Palaeothele montceauensis. Two fossils were found at Montceau-les-Mines, France, in ironstone concretion deposits of Late Carboniferous (Stephanian) age, about 304 to 299 million years ago.

== Taxonomy ==
The genus was first named as Eothele by Paul A. Selden in 1996. However, this name had already been used for a Cambrian brachiopod, so in 2000, Selden proposed the replacement name Palaeothele. Palaeothele is derived from the Greek παλαιός, "ancient", and θηλή, "nipple" – a common ending for spider names, referring to their spinnerets. The species name montceauensis refers to the location where the fossils were found.

=== Phylogeny ===
In 1996, Selden suggested the relationships shown in the cladogram below. (At the time, Attercopus was thought to be a spider; it is now considered to belong to a related but separate group, the Uraraneida.) Palaeothele is shown as sister to the modern genus Heptathela since they both have "tracheal sacs", structures adjacent to the posterior book lungs.

- - †Attercopus (uraraneid)
  - Araneae
    - Opisthothelae (non-mesothele spiders)
    - Mesothelae
      - Liphistius (modern mesothele spiders)
      - - Heptathela (modern mesothele spiders)
        - †Palaeothele
