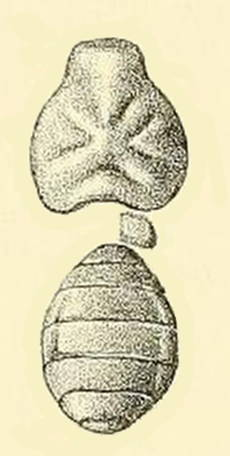
- Fossil illustration

Scientific classification
- Kingdom: Animalia
- Phylum: Arthropoda
- Subphylum: Chelicerata
- Class: Arachnida
- Order: Araneae (?)
- Family: †Arthrolycosidae
- Genus: †Eocteniza; Pocock, 1911
- Species: †E. silvicola

Binomial name
- †Eocteniza silvicola Pocock, 1911

= Eocteniza =

Eocteniza Temporal range: Westphalian

Extinct genus of arachnids

Eocteniza is an extinct genus of arachnids containing the sole species Eocteniza silvicola, known from the Westphalian stage of the Carboniferous period in Coseley, England, about 313 million years ago to 304 million years ago. It was initially identified as a spider, but this is now doubted.

== Description ==
The carapace (upper surface of the cephalothorax) is about 5 mm long by 4 mm wide. The abdomen is also about 5 mm long, slightly narrower at about 3.5 mm wide. The front end of the carapace is narrowed and raised, separated from the rest of the cephalothorax by shallow grooves, and bearing the eyes at the front. Pocock's description and drawing show in addition to the grooves separating the head from the rest of the thorax, three further pairs of radiating grooves, with the fovea towards the rear. This is different from mesothele spiders, whose fovea consists of a deep pit, with a transverse groove and deeper longitudinal groove.

== Taxonomy ==
The genus and species were first described by Reginald I. Pocock in 1911. Eocteniza is placed in the family Arthrolycosidae, together with the genus Arthrolycosa. At least some of the latter genus are considered to be spiders, whereas Eocteniza has been described as "rather problematic as a spider", as its carapace is very different from that expected for a mesothele spider.
