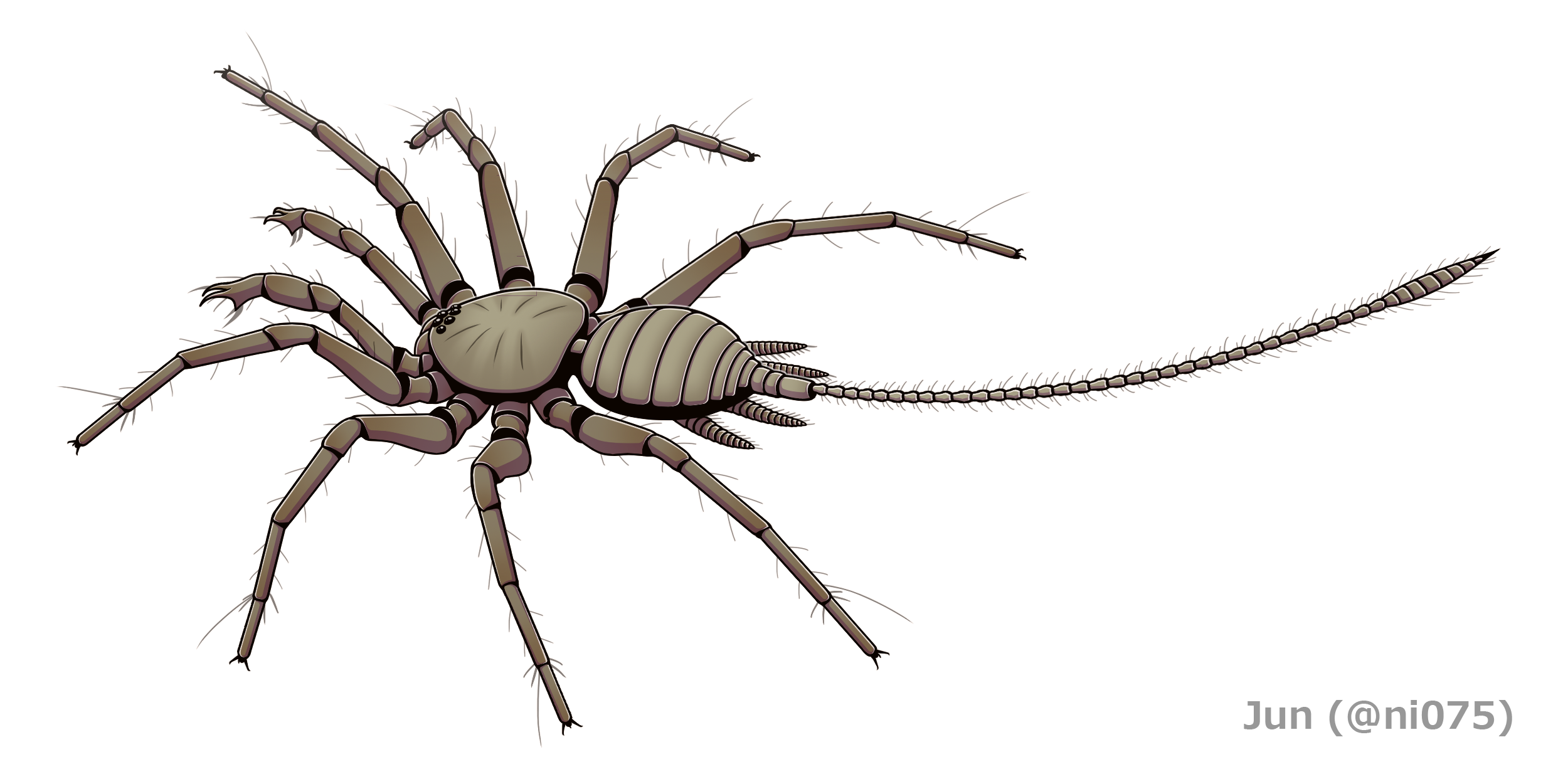
- Chimerarachne (Chimerarachnida)
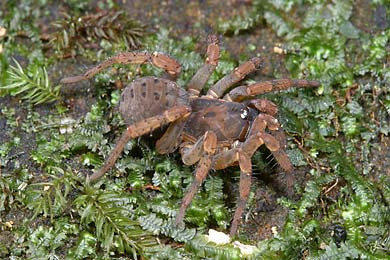
- Ryuthela tanikawai (Araneae, Mesothelae)

Scientific classification
- Domain: Eukaryota
- Kingdom: Animalia
- Phylum: Arthropoda
- Subphylum: Chelicerata
- Class: Arachnida
- Clade: Tetrapulmonata
- Clade: Araneida; Wunderlich, 2015 emend. Wunderlich 2019

Subdivisions
- †Chimerarachnida; Chimerarachne; Araneae

= Araneida =

Araneida Temporal range: Late Carboniferous–Recent

Suborder of spiders

Araneida is a subgroup of Tetrapulmonata. It was originally defined by Jörg Wunderlich in 2015 as a subgroup of Araneae, including all true spiders, with Wunderlich also including Uraraneida within Araneae. Araneida was redefined by Wunderlich in 2019 to include all modern spiders (Araneae), as well as Chimerarachnida, but excluding Uraraneida. Chimerarachnida and Araneae both possess spinnerets, which are absent in Uraraneida. Uraraneida and Araneida are grouped together in the clade Serikodiastida.

Original proposal (Wunderlich, 2015)

- Araneae
  - Uraraneida
  - Araneida (modern spiders)

Revised proposal (Wunderlich, 2019)

- Serikodiastida
  - Uraraneida
  - Araneida
    - Araneae (modern spiders)
    - Chimerarachnida

== See also ==
- Araneidae
