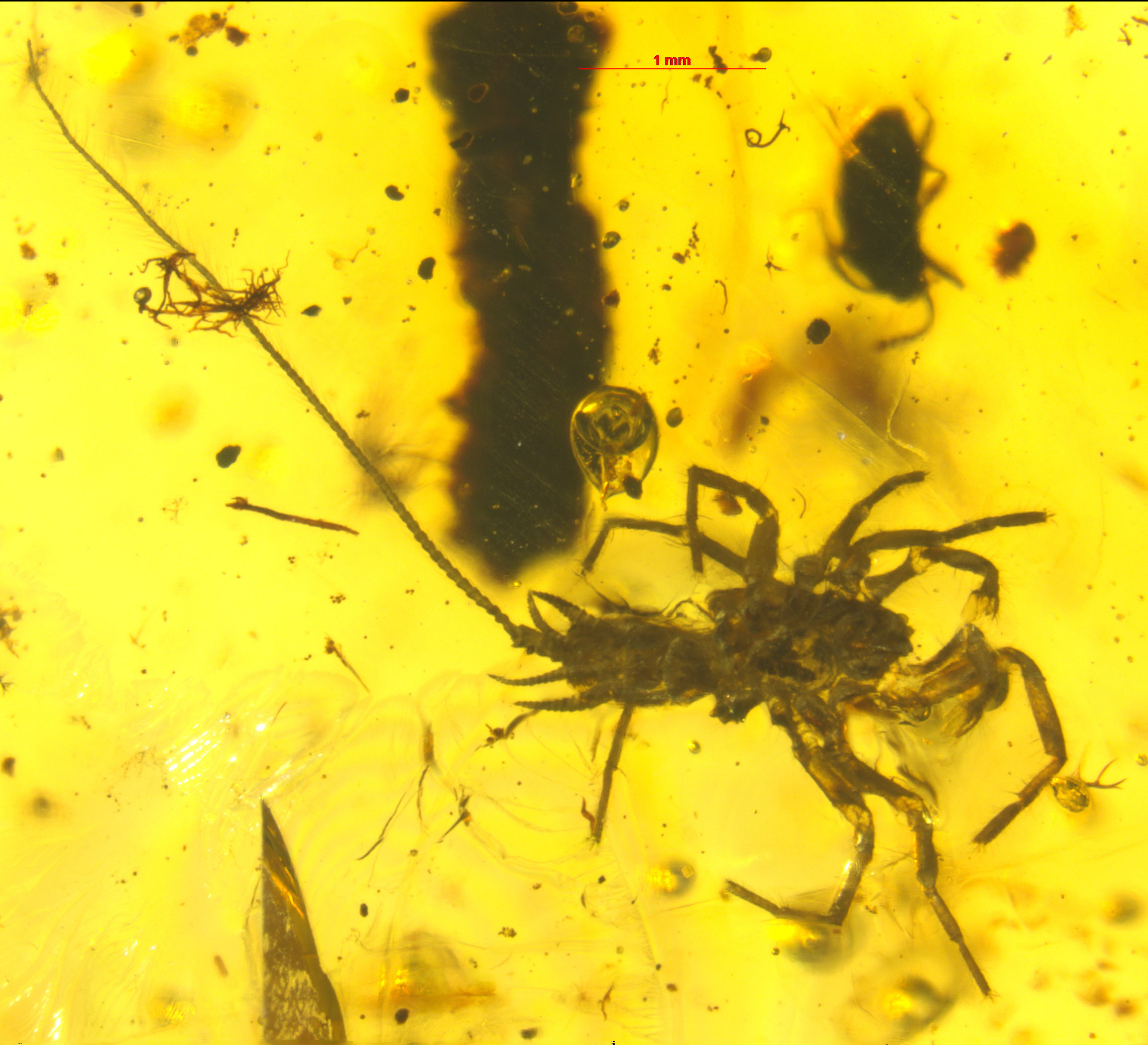
- C. yingi specimen NIGP167161 in amber

Scientific classification
- Kingdom: Animalia
- Phylum: Arthropoda
- Subphylum: Chelicerata
- Class: Arachnida
- Clade: Tetrapulmonata
- Order: †Chimerarachnida
- Family: †Chimerarachnidae
- Genus: †Chimerarachne; Wang et al., 2018

Type species
- †Chimerarachne yingi Wang et al., 2018

Species
- †Chimerarachne alexbeigel Wunderlich, 2023; †Chimerarachne longiflagellum (Wunderlich, 2022); †Chimerarachne patrickmueller Wunderlich, 2023; †Chimerarachne spiniflagellum Wunderlich, 2023; †Chimerarachne yingi Wang et al., 2018

Synonyms
- Parachimerarachne Wunderlich, 2022

= Chimerarachne =

Chimerarachne Temporal range: 110–100 Ma

Extinct genus of spider-like arachnids

Chimerarachne is a genus of extinct arachnids, containing five known species. Fossils of Chimerarachne were discovered in Burmese amber from Myanmar which dates to the mid-Cretaceous, about 100 million years ago. It is thought to be closely related to spiders, but to have diverged prior to the divergence between modern spider groups. The earliest spider fossils are from the Carboniferous, requiring Chimerarachne to have diverged from living spiders over 300 million years ago, leaving at least a 170 myr ghost lineage with no fossil record.

The size of the animal is quite small, being only 2.5 millimetres (0.098 in) in body length, with the tail being about 3 millimetres (0.12 in) in length. These fossils resemble spiders in having two of their key defining features: spinnerets for spinning silk, and a modified male organ on the pedipalp for transferring sperm. At the same time they retain a whip-like tail, rather like that of a whip scorpion and uraraneids.

Chimerarachne is not ancestral to spiders, being much younger than the oldest spiders which are known from the Carboniferous, but it appears to be a late survivor of an extinct group which was probably very close to the origins of spiders. It suggests that there used to be spider-like animals with tails which lived alongside true spiders for at least 200 million years.

== Discovery and naming ==
Five specimens of Chimerarachne yingi are known as of 2018. Two pairs of specimens were acquired independently by two different research teams during the summer of 2017. Their results were published back to back as companion papers in February 2018 in the journal Nature Ecology and Evolution.

The name is taken from the chimera, a monster in Greek mythology composed of parts of different animals, representing the mixture of basal and derived characteristics of the organism, together with the suffix arachne which is the Greek word for "spider". The species name honors Yanling Ying, who collected one of the specimens.

== Description ==
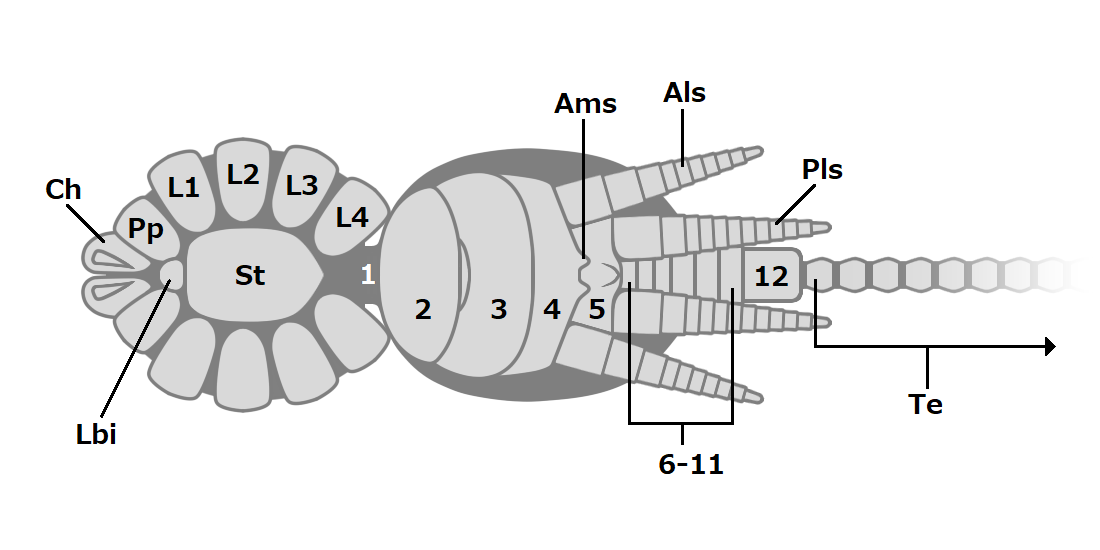
Ventral structures of Chimerarachne yingi 1-12: Opisthosomal segment 1-12 Als: Anterior lateral spinneret Ams: Anterior median spinneret Ch: Chelicera L1-4: Coxae of legs 1-4 Lbi: Labium Pp: Coxa of pedipalp Pls: Posterior lateral spinneret St: Prosomal sternite Te: Telson

=== Cephalothorax ===
The chelicerae (mouthparts) of Chimerarachne are modified into fangs and look similar to those of spiders belonging to the clades Mesothelae or Mygalomorphae. Like spiders, the fang lacks any hairs, but it is currently unclear whether or not the animal made venom.

All four of the original specimens had modified pedipalps, which look similar to the ones used by modern male spiders to transfer sperm during mating. This implies they were likely male. The fifth specimen lacked these modified pedipalps, and as such is presumably female. In males of Chimerarachne, the pedipalps have a palpal organ composing of a tarsus (or cymbium), which is divided at the tip into two long lobes, and a simple palpal bulb. The palpal bulb is similar to that of some mygalomorph spiders, though apparently less complex than the bulbs of mesotheles.

=== Abdomen ===
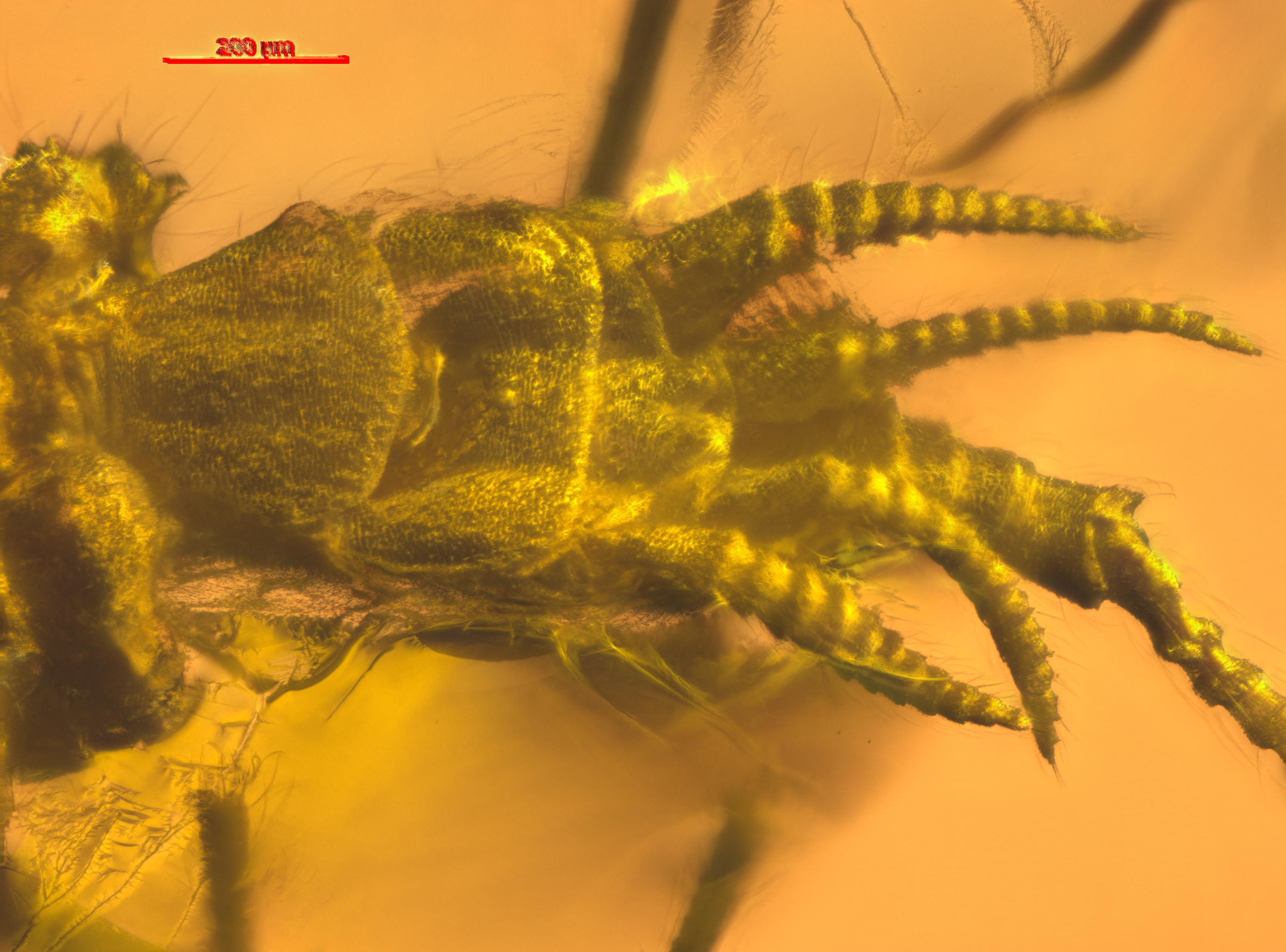
The underside of Chimerarachne showing its four spinnerets near the end of the abdomen.

The abdomen of Chimerarachne is segmented, like that of a mesothele spider. However, unlike spiders, there are several short cylindrical segments at the back from which a long segmented tail (or telson) emerges. In addition to the telson, the abdomen also bears four spinnerets on its underside. These spinnerets are especially interesting. It was widely assumed that when they first evolved, spiders should initially have had four pairs spinnerets in the middle of the abdomen as in modern mesothele spiders. By contrast, Chimerarachne has two pairs of quite well developed spinnerets towards the back of the abdomen which are similar in shape to those of mesotheles and which are probably equivalent to the anterior lateral spinnerets (ALS) and posterior lateral spinnerets (PLS) of modern spiders. There are, however, no posterior median spinnerets. In the place where the anterior median spinnerets (AMS) would be expected in spiders there is instead a pair of stubby spigots which could be spinnerets in the process of formation.

== Classification ==
The two publications agree on the basic anatomy and significance of these fossils, but differ slightly in the interpretation of their position of Chimerarachne in the arachnid tree of life. The Wang et al. study, which also named the fossils, placed the genus closer to spiders. The Huang et al. study placed Chimerarachne a little more distant from spiders and as part of an extinct arachnid order known as Uraraneida which are also spider-like, and have a tail, but which were not previously thought to have spinnerets. The fossils thus raise the question whether spiders should be defined by acquiring spinnerets and a male pedipalp organ or be defined by having lost the tail.

=== Species ===
Research by Jörg Wunderlich subsequently in 2022 and 2023 recognised several other species of Chimerarachne other than the type C. yingi, including C. alexbeigel, C. patrickmueller, and C. spiniflagellum. Wunderlich also named a second genus of chimerarachnid, Parachimerarchne in 2022 for the new species P. longifagellum, but later regarded the genus as a synonym of Chimerarachne (though the species as itself as distinct and valid) in a publication published a year later, with this synonymy recognised by the Interim Register of Marine and Nonmarine Genera.

=== Phylogeny ===
In 2019 and 2022, Wunderlich suggested dividing an order for spiders, Araneida into suborder Araneae and Chimerarachnida, excluding Uraraneida.

Position of Chimaerarachne, after Dunlop, 2022:

- Serikodiastida
  - †Uraraneida
  - Araneida
    - †Chimerarachne
    - Araneae (living spiders)
      - Mesothelae
      - Opisthothelae
        - Mygalomorphae
        - Araneomorphae

== See also ==
- 2018 in arthropod paleontology
