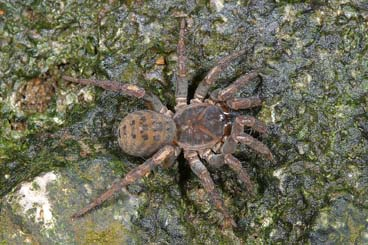
- Ryuthela nishihirai (female)

Scientific classification
- Kingdom: Animalia
- Phylum: Arthropoda
- Subphylum: Chelicerata
- Class: Arachnida
- Order: Araneae
- Suborder: Mesothelae
- Family: Liphistiidae
- Subfamily: Heptathelinae
- Genus: Ryuthela
- Species: R. nishihirai

Binomial name
- Ryuthela nishihirai (Haupt, 1979)

Synonyms
- Heptathela nishihirai Haupt, 1979

= Ryuthela nishihirai =

Species of spider

Ryuthela nishihirai is a species of spider in the subfamily Heptathelinae of the family Liphistiidae. They thrive on the Japanese islands of Okinawa.
