= Arthromygalidae =

Scientific classification
- Domain: Eukaryota
- Kingdom: Animalia
- Phylum: Arthropoda
- Subphylum: Chelicerata
- Class: Arachnida
- Order: Araneae (?)
- Family: †Arthromygalidae; Petrunkevitch, 1923

Extinct family of spiders

The Arthromygalidae are an extinct family of arachnids, possibly spiders. Fossils placed in the family were all found in the Carboniferous, 359 to 299 million years ago. They were considered by Alexander Petrunkevitch to be "mesotheles", i.e. placed in the spider suborder Mesothelae. Petrunkevitch used the family for Carboniferous fossils he regarded as mesotheles but which lacked eyes (those with eyes were placed in the Arthrolycosidae). Paul A. Selden has shown the fossil specimens only have "the general appearance of spiders", with segmented abdomens (opisthosomae), but no definite spinnerets.

== Genera ==
Genera placed in the Arthromygalidae as of 2015 are shown below, together with the location of the fossils.

- †Arthromygale Petrunkevitch, 1923 – Rakovník (Czech Republic)
- †Eolycosa Kušta, 1885 – Rakovník
- †Geralycosa Kušta, 1888 – Rakovník
- †Kustaria Petrunkevitch, 1953 – Rakovník
- †Palaranea Frič, 1873 – Czech Republic
- †Protocteniza Petrunkevitch, 1949 – Coseley (England)
- †Protolycosa Roemer, 1865 – Silesia, Cévennes (France)
- †Rakovnicia Kušta, 1884 – Rakovník
