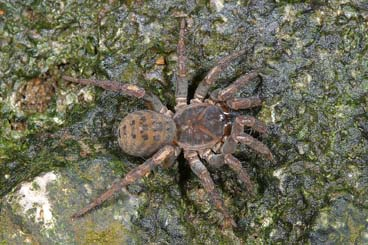
- Female Ryuthela nishihirai from Okinawa

Scientific classification
- Kingdom: Animalia
- Phylum: Arthropoda
- Subphylum: Chelicerata
- Class: Arachnida
- Order: Araneae
- Suborder: Mesothelae
- Family: Liphistiidae
- Subfamily: Heptathelinae
- Genus: Ryuthela; Haupt, 1983

Type species
- Heptathela nishihirai Haupt, 1979

Species
- See text.

= Ryuthela =

Genus of spiders

Ryuthela is a spider genus in the subfamily Heptathelinae, family Liphistiidae. This genus, as well as their closest relatives, Heptathela, formed when land masses from present-day Japan separated from the rest of Asia, forming islands in the late Miocene. Speciation of Ryuthela and Heptathela also occurred during this time, because of the further separation of islands, causing allopatric speciation.

They exhibit intraspecific variation in female genitalia despite being morphologically alike. Male spiders live only a few weeks after reaching maturity whereas female spiders can live up to 10 to 20 years (Huber, T. & Haug, C., 2021).

== Species list ==
As of November 2025, the World Spider Catalog accepted the following species:

- Ryuthela banna Xu, Liu, Ono, Chen, Kuntner & Li, 2017 — Ryukyu Islands
- Ryuthela henoko Xu, Liu, Ono, Chen, Kuntner & Li, 2017 — Ryukyu Islands
- Ryuthela hirakubo Xu, Liu, Ono, Chen, Kuntner & Li, 2017 — Ryukyu Islands
- Ryuthela iheyana Ono, 2002 — Ryukyu Islands
- Ryuthela ishigakiensis Haupt, 1983 — Ryukyu Islands
- Ryuthela kisenbaru Xu, Liu, Ono, Chen, Kuntner & Li, 2017 — Ryukyu Islands
- Ryuthela motobu Xu, Liu, Ono, Chen, Kuntner & Li, 2017 — Ryukyu Islands
- Ryuthela nago Xu, Liu, Ono, Chen, Kuntner & Li, 2017 — Ryukyu Islands
- Ryuthela nishihirai (Haupt, 1979) — Ryukyu Islands
- Ryuthela owadai Ono, 1997 — Ryukyu Islands
- Ryuthela sasakii Ono, 1997 — Ryukyu Islands
- Ryuthela shimojanai Xu, Liu, Ono, Chen, Kuntner & Li, 2017 — Ryukyu Islands
- Ryuthela tanikawai Ono, 1997 — Ryukyu Islands
- Ryuthela unten Xu, Liu, Ono, Chen, Kuntner & Li, 2017 — Ryukyu Islands
- Ryuthela yarabu Xu, Liu, Ono, Chen, Kuntner & Li, 2017 — Ryukyu Islands
