= Sinothela =

Scientific classification
- Kingdom: Animalia
- Phylum: Arthropoda
- Subphylum: Chelicerata
- Class: Arachnida
- Order: Araneae
- Suborder: Mesothelae
- Family: Liphistiidae
- Subfamily: Heptathelinae
- Genus: Sinothela; Haupt, 2003 (nom. dub.)

Species
- See text.

Possible genus of spiders

Sinothela is a possible genus of spiders in the subfamily Heptathelinae. It was first described in 2003 by Haupt. The type species Heptathela sinensis had been described in 1932 based on a female specimen, but was transferred to the new genus Sinothela based on a male specimen that cannot be confidently matched to the female, so both Sinothela sinensis and Sinothela are considered to be nomina dubia (dubious names).
