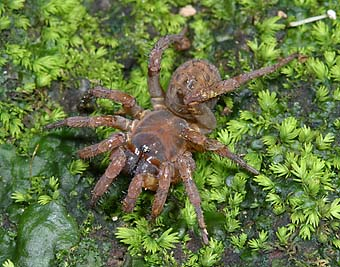
- Heptathela kimurai

Scientific classification
- Kingdom: Animalia
- Phylum: Arthropoda
- Subphylum: Chelicerata
- Class: Arachnida
- Order: Araneae
- Suborder: Mesothelae
- Family: Liphistiidae
- Subfamily: Heptathelinae
- Genus: Heptathela; Kishida, 1923

Species
- See text

Diversity
- 20 species

= Heptathela =

Genus of trapdoor spiders

Heptathela is a genus of spiders that includes the Kimura spider (Heptathela kimurai). They are trapdoor spiders of the subfamily Heptathelinae, family Liphistiidae. The genus is found in Japan, including Okinawa and the Ryukyu Islands. Spiders of this genus lack venom glands.

Females are up to 25 mm long, males slightly smaller. Burrows have an oval shaped door which is hinged across the long diameter.

== Name ==
The genus name is derived from Ancient Greek hepta "seven", referring to the number of spinneret glands.

== Species ==
As of January 2022, the World Spider Catalog accepted the following species:

- Heptathela aha Xu, Ono, Kuntner, Liu & Li, 2019 – Ryukyu Is.
- Heptathela amamiensis Haupt, 1983 – Ryukyu Is.
- Heptathela crypta Xu, Ono, Kuntner, Liu & Li, 2019 – Ryukyu Is.
- Heptathela gayozan Xu, Ono, Kuntner, Liu & Li, 2019 – Ryukyu Is.
- Heptathela helios Tanikawa & Miyashita, 2014 (synonym H. yaginumai Ono, 1998) – Japan
- Heptathela higoensis Haupt, 1983 – Japan
- Heptathela kanenoi Ono, 1996 – Ryukyu Is.
- Heptathela kikuyai Ono, 1998 – Japan
- Heptathela kimurai (Kishida, 1920) (type species) – Japan
- Heptathela kojima Xu et al., 2019 – Ryukyu Is.
- Heptathela kubayama Xu et al., 2019 – Ryukyu Is.
- Heptathela mae Xu et al., 2019 – Ryukyu Is.
- Heptathela otoha Xu et al., 2019 – Ryukyu Is.
- Heptathela shuri Xu et al., 2019 – Ryukyu Is.
- Heptathela sumiyo Xu et al., 2019 – Ryukyu Is.
- Heptathela tokashiki Xu et al., 2019 – Ryukyu Is.
- Heptathela uken Xu et al., 2019 – Ryukyu Is.
- Heptathela unten Xu et al., 2019 – Ryukyu Is.
- Heptathela yakushimaensis Ono, 1998 – Japan
- Heptathela yanbaruensis Haupt, 1983 – Okinawa

Many of the species formerly placed in this genus have been transferred to other genera in the family Liphistiidae, including Luthela, Songthela and Vinathela.

== Social reference ==
This is the genus of spider referenced by Vincent Price in the introduction to Alice Cooper's The Black Widow on his Welcome to my Nightmare album.
