= Salix anticecrenata =

Scientific classification
- Kingdom: Plantae
- Clade: Tracheophytes
- Clade: Angiosperms
- Clade: Eudicots
- Clade: Rosids
- Order: Malpighiales
- Family: Salicaceae
- Genus: Salix
- Species: S. anticecrenata

Binomial name
- Salix anticecrenata Kimura

Shrub in the genus of willows

Salix anticecrenata is a low, pillow-shaped shrub from the genus of willow (Salix) with about 1.5 centimeters long leaf blades. The natural range of the species is in Nepal and China.

== Description ==
Salix anticecrenata forms pillow-shaped shrubs a few centimeters high. The leaves have a stalk about 1 millimeter long. The leaf blade is about 1.5 centimeters long, 0.7 centimeters wide, elliptical or obovate-elliptical, pointed, with a wedge-shaped leaf base and a remotely notched leaf margin. Both sides of the leaf are almost bare, the upper side is green and somewhat wrinkled, the underside greenish. Four pairs of nerves are formed.

Growing, elliptical-headed catkins from five to six flowers are formed as inflorescences at the branch ends. The bracts are usually rounded and almost as long as the stamens, more or less membranous, glabrous, sparsely ciliate and three-veined. Male flowers have an adaxial and an abaxial nectar gland. The two stamens are 2 to 2.5 millimeters long, ingrown and bare. The anthers are yellow and elliptical. Female flowers have an adaxially located nectar gland. The ovary is 1.3 to 1.5 millimeters long, narrow ovate, bald and short stalks. The stylus is short and two columns, the scarbilobed. The flowers appear with or after the leaves shoot.

== Range ==
The natural range is on mountain slopes at 3300 to 4200 meters altitude in Nepal, in the northwest of the Chinese province of Yunnan, in the west of Sichuan and in Tibet.

== Taxonomy ==
Salix anticecrenata is a species from the willow genus (Salix), in the family (Salicaceae). There she is assigned to the Lindleyanae section. It was described for the first time scientifically in 1975 by Arika Kimura. The genus name Salix is Latin and has been from the Romans used for various willow species.

== Literature ==
- Wu Zheng-yi, Peter H. Raven (Hrsg.): Flora of China. Volume 4: Cycadaceae through Fagaceae. Science Press/Missouri Botanical Garden Press, Beijing/St. Louis 1999, ISBN 0-915279-70-3, S. 214 (englisch).
- Helmut Genaust: Etymologisches Wörterbuch der botanischen Pflanzennamen. 3., vollständig überarbeitete und erweiterte Auflage. Nikol, Hamburg 2005, ISBN 3-937872-16-7 (Nachdruck von 1996).
