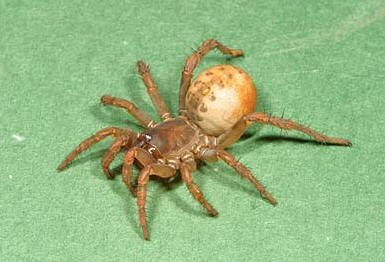
- A female Ryuthela sasakii

Scientific classification
- Kingdom: Animalia
- Phylum: Arthropoda
- Subphylum: Chelicerata
- Class: Arachnida
- Order: Araneae
- Suborder: Mesothelae
- Family: Liphistiidae
- Subfamily: Heptathelinae
- Genus: Ryuthela
- Species: R. sasakii

Binomial name
- Ryuthela sasakii Ono, 1997

Synonyms
- Ryuthela secundaria Ono, 1997

= Ryuthela sasakii =

Species of spider

Ryuthela saskii is a species of spider in the genus Ryuthela. The species is endemic to the Ryukyu Islands in Japan.
