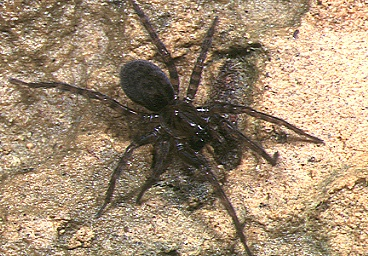
- Iwogumoa yaeyamensis (female)

Scientific classification
- Kingdom: Animalia
- Phylum: Arthropoda
- Subphylum: Chelicerata
- Class: Arachnida
- Order: Araneae
- Infraorder: Araneomorphae
- Family: Agelenidae
- Genus: Iwogumoa; Kishida, 1955

Type species
- I. insidiosa (L. Koch, 1878)

Species
- 20, see text

Synonyms
- Asiacoelotes

= Iwogumoa =

Genus of spiders

Iwogumoa is a genus of Asian funnel weavers first described by Kyukichi Kishida in 1955.

== Species ==
As of October 2026 it contains twenty species:

- Iwogumoa acco (Nishikawa, 1987) – Japan
- Iwogumoa dalianensis Zhang, Zhu & Wang, 2017 – China
- Iwogumoa dicranata (Wang, Yin, Peng & Xie, 1990) – China
- Iwogumoa ensifer (Wang & Ono, 1998) – Taiwan
- Iwogumoa filamentacea (Tang, Yin & Zhang, 2002) – China
- Iwogumoa illustrata (Wang, Yin, Peng & Xie, 1990) – China
- Iwogumoa insidiosa (L. Koch, 1878) – Russia (Far East), Korea, Japan
- Iwogumoa interuna (Nishikawa, 1977) – Russia (Far East), Korea, Japan
- Iwogumoa longa (Wang, Tso & Wu, 2001) – Taiwan
- Iwogumoa montivaga (Wang & Ono, 1998) – Taiwan
- Iwogumoa nagasakiensis Okumura, 2007 – Japan
- Iwogumoa pengi (Ovtchinnikov, 1999) – China
- Iwogumoa plancyi (Simon, 1880) – China, Japan
- Iwogumoa songminjae (Paik & Yaginuma, 1969) – China, Korea
- Iwogumoa taoyuandong (Bao & Yin, 2004) – China
- Iwogumoa tengchihensis (Wang & Ono, 1998) – Taiwan
- Iwogumoa xieae Liu & Li, 2008 – China
- Iwogumoa xinhuiensis (Chen, 1984) – China, Taiwan
- Iwogumoa yaeyamensis (Shimojana, 1982) – Japan
- Iwogumoa yushanensis (Wang & Ono, 1998) – Taiwan
