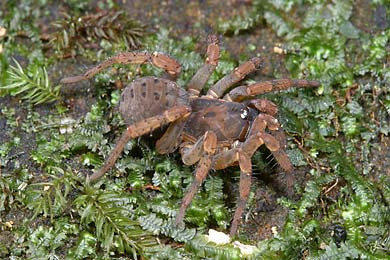

Scientific classification
- Kingdom: Animalia
- Phylum: Arthropoda
- Subphylum: Chelicerata
- Class: Arachnida
- Order: Araneae
- Suborder: Mesothelae
- Family: Liphistiidae
- Genus: Ryuthela
- Species: R. tanikawai

Binomial name
- Ryuthela tanikawai Ono, 1997

= Ryuthela tanikawai =

Species of spider

Ryuthela tanikawai is a species of spider in the subfamily Heptathelinae of the family Liphistiidae.
