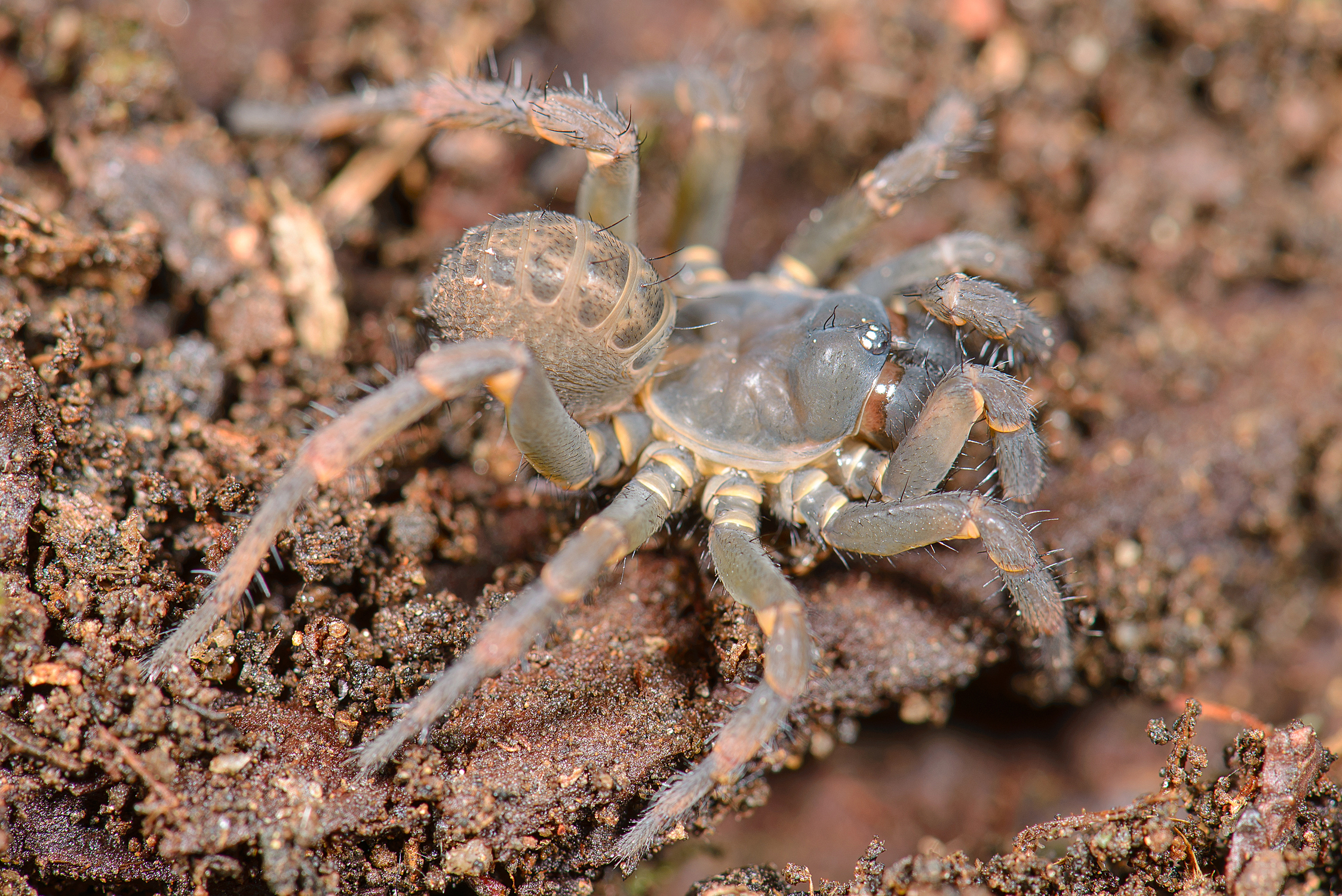
- Tentative photo of Heptathela higoensis

Scientific classification
- Kingdom: Animalia
- Phylum: Arthropoda
- Subphylum: Chelicerata
- Class: Arachnida
- Order: Araneae
- Suborder: Mesothelae
- Family: Liphistiidae
- Subfamily: Heptathelinae
- Genus: Heptathela
- Species: H. higoensis

Binomial name
- Heptathela higoensis Haupt, 1983

= Heptathela higoensis =

Species of spider

Heptathela higoensis is a species of spider that is native to Kyushu island, Japan.

== Description ==
Both male and female members of this species have a carapace that are yellow-brown while the opisthosoma is light brown with dark brown tergites close to each other. They have 7-8 spinnerets.
