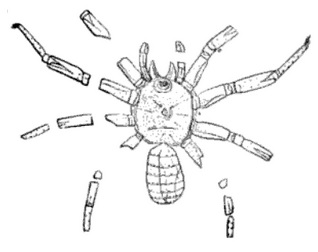
- Illustration of the fossil arachnid Arthrolycosa antiqua

Scientific classification
- Kingdom: Animalia
- Phylum: Arthropoda
- Subphylum: Chelicerata
- Class: Arachnida
- Order: Araneae (?)
- Family: †Arthrolycosidae; Frič, 1904

= Arthrolycosidae =

Arthrolycosidae Temporal range: Carboniferous-Permian 318.1–268.8 Ma

Extinct family of animals, possibly spiders

Arthrolycosidae is an extinct family of arachnids, possibly spiders. Fossils placed in the family were found in the period spanning Carboniferous to Permian. They were considered by Alexander Petrunkevitch to be "mesotheles", i.e. placed in the spider suborder Mesothelae. However, Paul A. Selden has stated they only have "the general appearance of spiders", with segmented abdomens (opisthosomae), but no definite spinnerets. At least some of the specimens placed in the family in the genus Arthrolycosa are considered to be spiders, whereas Eocteniza is "rather problematic as a spider".

== Genera ==
Genera placed in the Arthrolycosidae as of 2015 are shown below, together with the location of the fossils.

- †Arthrolycosa Harger, 1874 – United States (Mazon Creek), Ukraine, Russia
- †Eocteniza Pocock, 1911 – England (Coseley)
