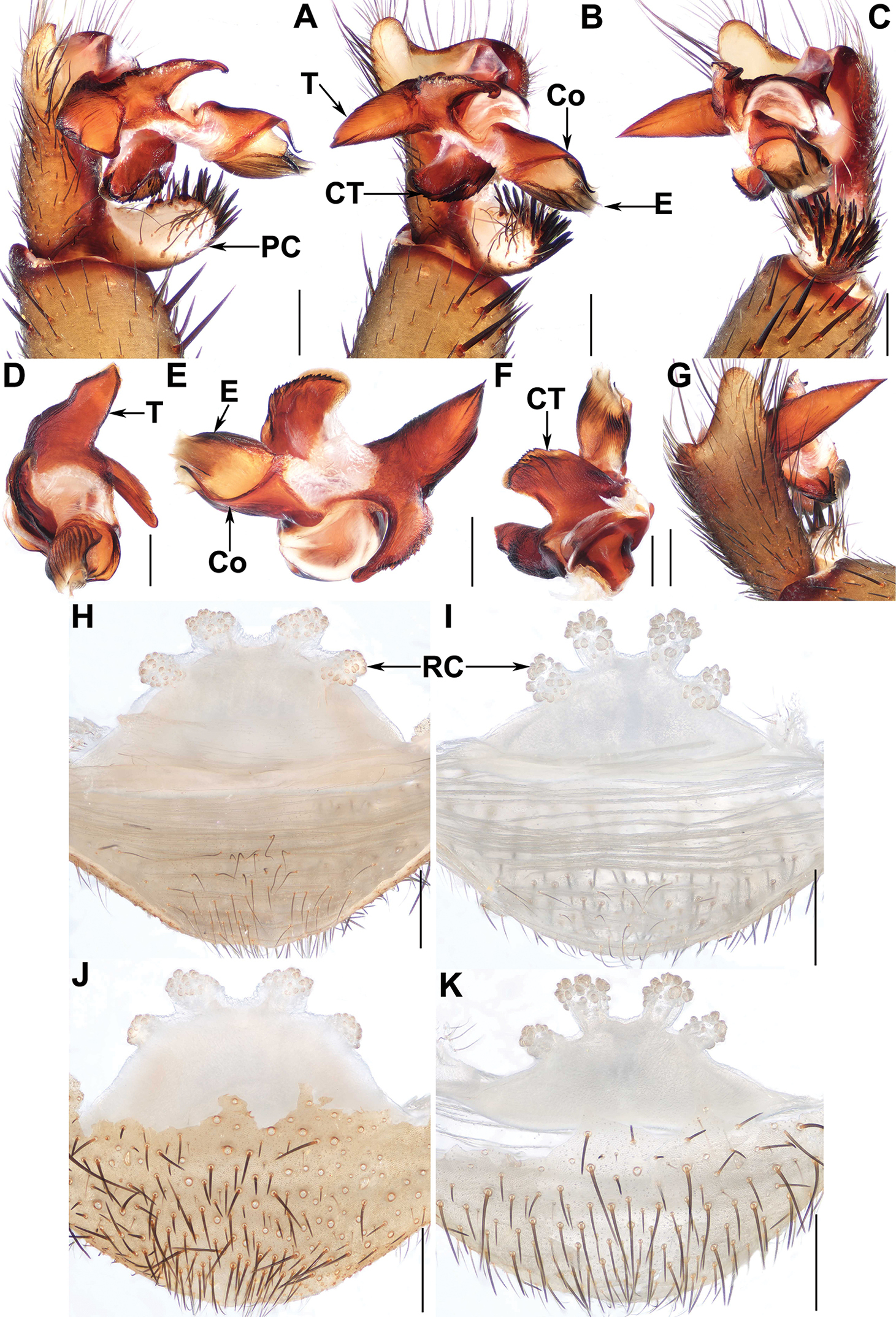

Scientific classification
- Kingdom: Animalia
- Phylum: Arthropoda
- Subphylum: Chelicerata
- Class: Arachnida
- Order: Araneae
- Suborder: Mesothelae
- Family: Liphistiidae
- Subfamily: Heptathelinae
- Genus: Qiongthela; Xu & Kuntner, 2015

Species
- See text.

= Qiongthela =

Genus of spiders

Qiongthela is a genus of spiders in the subfamily Heptathelinae, family Liphistiidae. As of 2021, it contained 14 species.

== Taxonomy ==
Qiongthela gets its name from "Qiong-" referring to Hainan Province, China (where some species of this genus are found). "-thela" comes from the Ancient Greek "θηλη" meaning "nipple-like protuberance", referring to the spinnerets. This "-thela" suffix is a tradition for heptatheline genera.

== Description ==
Qiongthela ranges in size from 13-31mm in length (excluding the chelicerae). The male's palp has a long, blade-like conductor with a slightly hook-like apex. The tegulum has two margins and the paracymbium is spinose.

Females have two paired receptacular clusters, situated on the anterior edge of the bursa copulatrix.

== Biology ==
These primitive spiders live in burrows with trapdoors at the entrance. These trapdoors are 3.3 cm wide and 2.5 cm long for females and the males' trapdoors are 2.0-2.3 cm wide and 1.5-1.8 cm long. The hinges of the trapdoor are located at the top and the bottom protrudes slightly. The spiders prefer not to rest near the top of the burrow and will not be coaxed out by flexible grass blades, which will often coax out other genera in the family, e.g. Liphistius.

Egg cases of this genus contain yellow eggs and have more than one hundred individual eggs in them. They are coated in a thin layer of coagulated vulval secretion and some fine silken threads. This structure rests on a mesh of fine threads above the bottom of the inner chamber of the egg case.

When medium to large-sized individuals are disturbed, they rise their bodies up off the ground whilst keeping their tarsi on the ground and spreading their chelicerae. This behaviour is known as "tip-toeing".

== Species ==
Qiongthela is found only in Asia. As of January 2021, the World Spider Catalog accepted 14 species.

- Qiongthela australis (Ono, 2002) – Vietnam
- Qiongthela baishensis Xu, 2015 – Hainan
- Qiongthela baoting Yu, Liu, Zhang, Wang, Li & Xu, 2020 – Hainan
- Qiongthela bawang Xu, Liu, Kuntner & Li, 2017 – Hainan
- Qiongthela dongfang Yu, Liu, Zhang, Li & Xu, 2021 – Hainan
- Qiongthela jianfeng Xu, Liu, Kuntner & Li, 2017 – Hainan
- Qiongthela nankai Yu, Liu, Zhang, Li & Xu, 2021 – Hainan
- Qiongthela nui (Schwendinger & Ono, 2011) – Vietnam
- Qiongthela qiongzhong Yu, Liu, Zhang, Wang, Li & Xu, 2020 – Hainan
- Qiongthela sanya Yu, Liu, Zhang, Wang, Li & Xu, 2020 – Hainan
- Qiongthela wuzhi Xu, Liu, Kuntner & Li, 2017 – Hainan
- Qiongthela yalin Yu, Liu, Zhang, Li & Xu, 2021 – Hainan
- Qiongthela yinai Xu, Liu, Kuntner & Li, 2017 – Hainan
- Qiongthela yinggezui Yu, Liu, Zhang, Wang, Li & Xu, 2020 – Hainan
