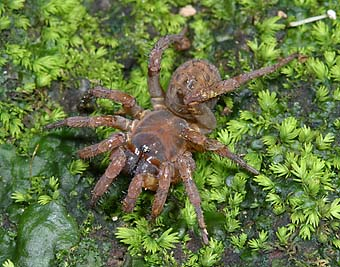
- Heptathela kimurai yanbaruensis (female).

Scientific classification
- Kingdom: Animalia
- Phylum: Arthropoda
- Subphylum: Chelicerata
- Class: Arachnida
- Order: Araneae
- Suborder: Mesothelae
- Family: Liphistiidae
- Subfamily: Heptathelinae
- Genus: Heptathela
- Species: H. kimurai

Binomial name
- Heptathela kimurai (Kishida, 1920)

Synonyms
- Liphistius kimurai Kishida, 1920

= Kimura spider =

Species of trapdoor spider

Heptathela kimurai, also known as the Kimura spider (キムラグモ, Kimura-gumo), is an Old World spider native to East Asia and found primarily in Japan. It is named after Japanese botanist Arika Kimura, who first collected it in 1920. It belongs to the sub-order Mesothelae (primitive burrowing spiders) and can reach up to 3 cm in length. Its burrows are covered by a camouflaged "pill box" flap.

== Taxonomy ==
Heptathela kimurai was first described by Kyukichi Kishida in 1920, when it was placed in the genus Liphistius as L. kimurai. In 1923, Kishida erected the genus Heptathela for the species, as on re-examination he decided it was sufficiently distinct from spiders of the genus Liphistius. The species name kimurai honours the collector, Arika Kimura.
