= Iwogumoa insidiosa =

Scientific classification
- Kingdom: Animalia
- Phylum: Arthropoda
- Subphylum: Chelicerata
- Class: Arachnida
- Order: Araneae
- Infraorder: Araneomorphae
- Family: Agelenidae
- Genus: Iwogumoa
- Species: I. insidiosa

Binomial name
- Iwogumoa insidiosa (Koch, 1878)

Species of spider

Iwogumoa insidiosa, formerly Coelotes insidiosus, is a species of spider in the family Agelenidae, found in Russia, Korea and Japan. It makes a home like a tube in stone walls, and also in paving stones around garden lanterns. The spider is 8-12 millimeters.
