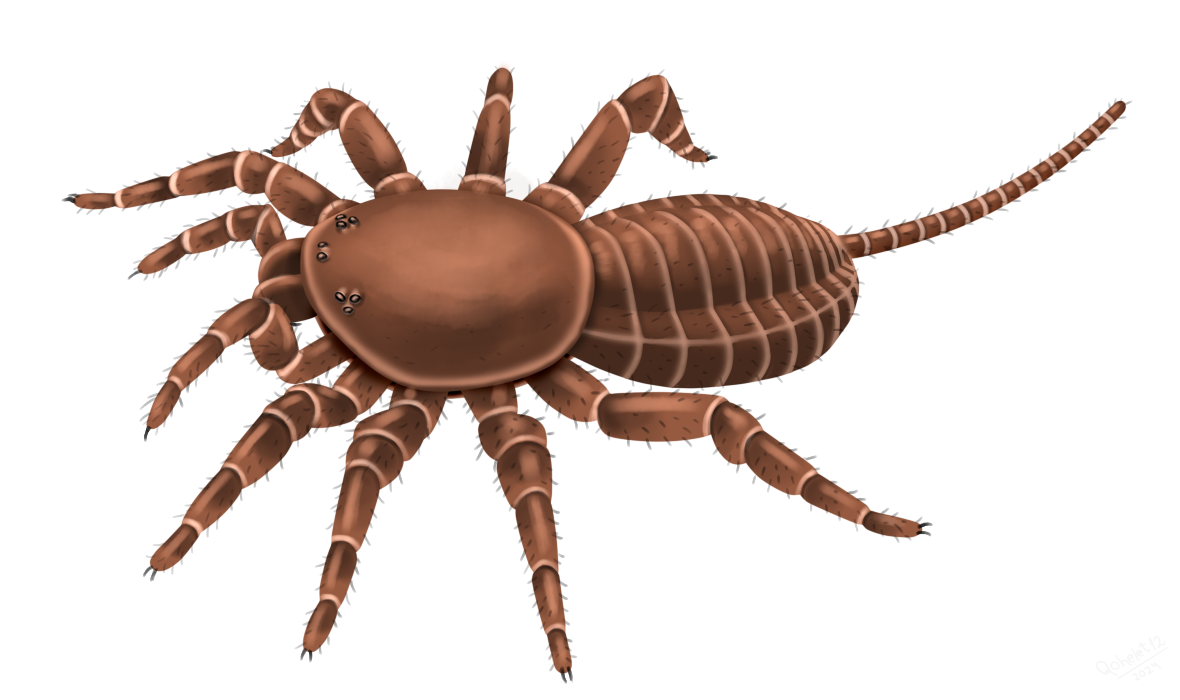
- Artist's reconstruction of Attercopus

Scientific classification
- Kingdom: Animalia
- Phylum: Arthropoda
- Subphylum: Chelicerata
- Class: Arachnida
- Clade: Tetrapulmonata
- Order: †Uraraneida; Selden & Shear, 2008

Genera
- †Attercopus; †Permarachne

= Uraraneida =

Uraraneida Temporal range: Givetian to Kungurian

Order of arachnids

Uraraneida is an extinct order of Paleozoic arachnids related to modern spiders. Two genera of fossils have been definitively placed in this order: Attercopus from the Devonian of United States and Permarachne from the Permian of Russia. Like spiders, they are known to have produced silk, but lack the characteristic spinnerets of modern spiders, and retain elongate telsons.

== Characteristics ==
The first fossil now placed in the order was found in Gilboa, New York. In 1987, it was initially tentatively placed in the extinct order Trigonotarbida and named Gelasinotarbus? fimbriunguis. Later, partly on the basis of a supposed spinneret, it was identified as a spider and named Attercopus fimbriunguis. Further specimens of this species were found, and when examined in detail, along with those assigned to the genus Permarachne, features inconsistent with their placement as spiders were revealed. Silk producing spigots are present, but are borne along the rear edges of ventral plates, not on appendage-like spinnerets, as in spiders. The specimens also have a long, jointed "tail" or flagellum at the end of the abdomen, after the anus, a feature lacking in spiders but present in some other arachnids, such as uropygids.

== Phylogeny and classification ==
A 2014 study placed the Uraraneida in the Tetrapulmonata, a clade of arachnids defined by the apomorphy (derived feature) of two pairs of book lungs. The Tetrapulmonata divide into two main clades, one of which, Serikodiastida (Greek for "silk workers"), unites Uraraneida and Araneae (spiders), groups that share the ability to produce and use silk.

An alternative classification suggested by Wunderlich in 2015, based on the same phylogeny, makes Uraraneida a suborder of Araneae, with "true spiders" treated as suborder Araneida.

Garwood and Dunlop	Wunderlich
clade Serikodiastida: order Uraraneida; order Araneae	order Araneae: suborder Uraraneida; suborder Araneida

In 2016, a fossil arachnid from the Pennsylvanian ("Late Carboniferous") age was described under the name Idmonarachne brasieri. It resembles uraraneids in lacking spinnerets, but unlike them resembles spiders in lacking a flagellum. The Late Carboniferous appears to be a time when there was a greater diversity of tetrapulmonate arachnids, of which the uraraneids were just one group. In 2018, two groups simultaneously published a new taxon, Chimerarachne from the mid-Cretaceous of Myanmar, which was considered either to be a member of Uraraneida, or more closely related to spiders. Later studies considered it to be more closely related to true spiders than to Uraraneida, due to it possessing spinnerets, which Uraraneida lack.

Cladogram of Tetrapulmonata after Dunlop 2022.

- Tetrapulmonata
  - Shizotarsata
    - †Haptopoda
    - Pedipalpi
      - Amblypygi (whip spiders)
      - - Uropygi (whip scorpions/vinegaroons)
        - Schizomida (short-tailed whip-scorpions)
  - Serikodiastida
    - †Uraraneida
    - Araneida
      - †Chimerarachne
      - Araneae (living spiders)
        - Mesothelae
        - Opisthothelae
          - Mygalomorphae
          - Araneomorphae

== Genera and species ==
Dunlop et al. (2015) accepted two species:

- Attercopus Selden & Shear, 1991
  - Attercopus fimbriunguis (Shear, Selden & Rolfe, 1987) – Devonian; Gilboa, New York
- Permarachne Eskov & Selden, 2005
  - Permarachne novokshonovi Eskov & Selden, 2005 – Permian; Matveyevka, Perm Krai, Russia
