= Permarachne =

Permarachne Temporal range: Kungurian

Scientific classification
- Kingdom: Animalia
- Phylum: Arthropoda
- Subphylum: Chelicerata
- Class: Arachnida
- Clade: Tetrapulmonata
- Order: †Uraraneida
- Genus: †Permarachne; Eskov and Selden, 2005
- Species: †P. novokshonovi

Binomial name
- †Permarachne novokshonovi (Eskov and Selden, 2005)

Extinct genus of spider-like arachnids

Permarachne is an extinct genus of arachnids containing the single species Permarachne novokshonovi from the Permian (Kungurian) of Russia, found in the Koshelevka Formation near the town of Suksun in Perm Krai. It is closely related to modern spiders but unlike them, it has a long thin tail, similar to its relative Attercopus, it is known from the mostly complete holotype PIN 4909/12. It is about 1 cm in size. It initially was thought to be a spider, but is now thought to form a clade with at least its close relative Attercopus, forming the grouping Uraraneida.
