= Luthela =

Scientific classification
- Kingdom: Animalia
- Phylum: Arthropoda
- Subphylum: Chelicerata
- Class: Arachnida
- Order: Araneae
- Suborder: Mesothelae
- Family: Liphistiidae
- Subfamily: Heptathelinae
- Genus: Luthela; Xu & Li, 2022

Species
- See text.

Genus of spiders

Luthela asuka

Luthela is a genus of spiders in the subfamily Heptathelinae, family Liphistiidae, found in China.

== Taxonomy ==
The genus Luthela was erected in 2022 with the type species Luthela yiyuan. Five further new species were described. The species Heptathela sinensis had been described in 1932 based on a female specimen, and transferred to the new genus Sinothela in 2003 based on a male specimen that cannot be confidently matched to the female, so the authors of Luthela regard both Sinothela sinensis and Sinothela to be nomina dubia (dubious names). Accordingly, two species that had been placed in Sinothela were transferred to Luthela. Three further new species were added to the genus in 2023.

=== Species ===
As of April 2024, the World Spider Catalog accepted the following extant species:

- Luthela asuka Wei & Lin, 2023 – China
- Luthela badong Xu, Yu, Liu & Li, 2022 – China
- Luthela beijing Wei & Lin, 2023 – China
- Luthela dengfeng Xu, Yu, Liu & Li, 2022 – China
- Luthela handan Xu, Yu, Liu & Li, 2022 – China
- Luthela kagami Wei & Lin, 2023 – China
- Luthela luotianensis (Yin, Tang, Zhao & Chen, 2002) – China
- Luthela schensiensis (Schenkel, 1953) – China
- Luthela taian Xu, Yu, Liu & Li, 2022 – China
- Luthela yiyuan Xu, Yu, Liu & Li, 2022 (type species) – China
- Luthela yuncheng Xu, Yu, Liu & Li, 2022 – China
