= Vinathela =

Scientific classification
- Kingdom: Animalia
- Phylum: Arthropoda
- Subphylum: Chelicerata
- Class: Arachnida
- Order: Araneae
- Suborder: Mesothelae
- Family: Liphistiidae
- Subfamily: Heptathelinae
- Genus: Vinathela; Ono, 2000

Type species
- Vinathela cucphuongensis

Species
- 6, see text

Genus of spiders

Vinathela is a genus of spiders in the subfamily Heptathelinae, family Liphistiidae. It was first described in 2000. As of November 2025, it contained eight species. Two species were formerly placed in the genus Nanthela, now submerged into Vinathela.

== Species ==
As of November 2025, Vinathela comprised the following species:

- Vinathela abca (Ono, 1999) - Vietnam
- Vinathela cucphuongensis (Ono, 1999) - Vietnam
- Vinathela hongkong (Song & Wu, 1997) - Hong Kong
- Vinathela hunanensis (Song & Haupt, 1984) - China
- Vinathela nahang Logunov & Vahtera, 2017 - Vietnam
- Vinathela nenglianggu Li, Liu & Xu, 2019 - China
- Vinathela tomokunii (Ono, 1997) - Vietnam
- Vinathela tonkinensis (Bristowe, 1933) - Vietnam
