= Arika Kimura =

Japanese botanist (1900–1996)

- Born: 1 March 1900
- Died: 1 September 1996 (aged 96)
- Scientific career
- Fields: Botany
- Author abbrev. (botany): Kimura

Arika Kimura (木村 有香, Kimura Arika; 1 March 1900 – 1 September 1996) was a Japanese botanist and specialist in the Salicaceae, or willow family. He was a professor of botany at the University of Tokyo and at Tohoku University. Kimura was also the first director of the Botanical Garden of Tohoku University. A species of spider, Heptathela kimurai, was named in his honour.
