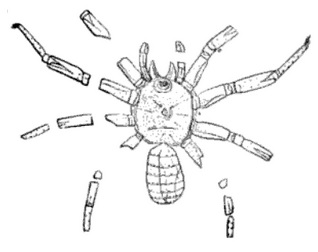
- Arthrolycosa antiqua, illustrated by C. E. Beecher
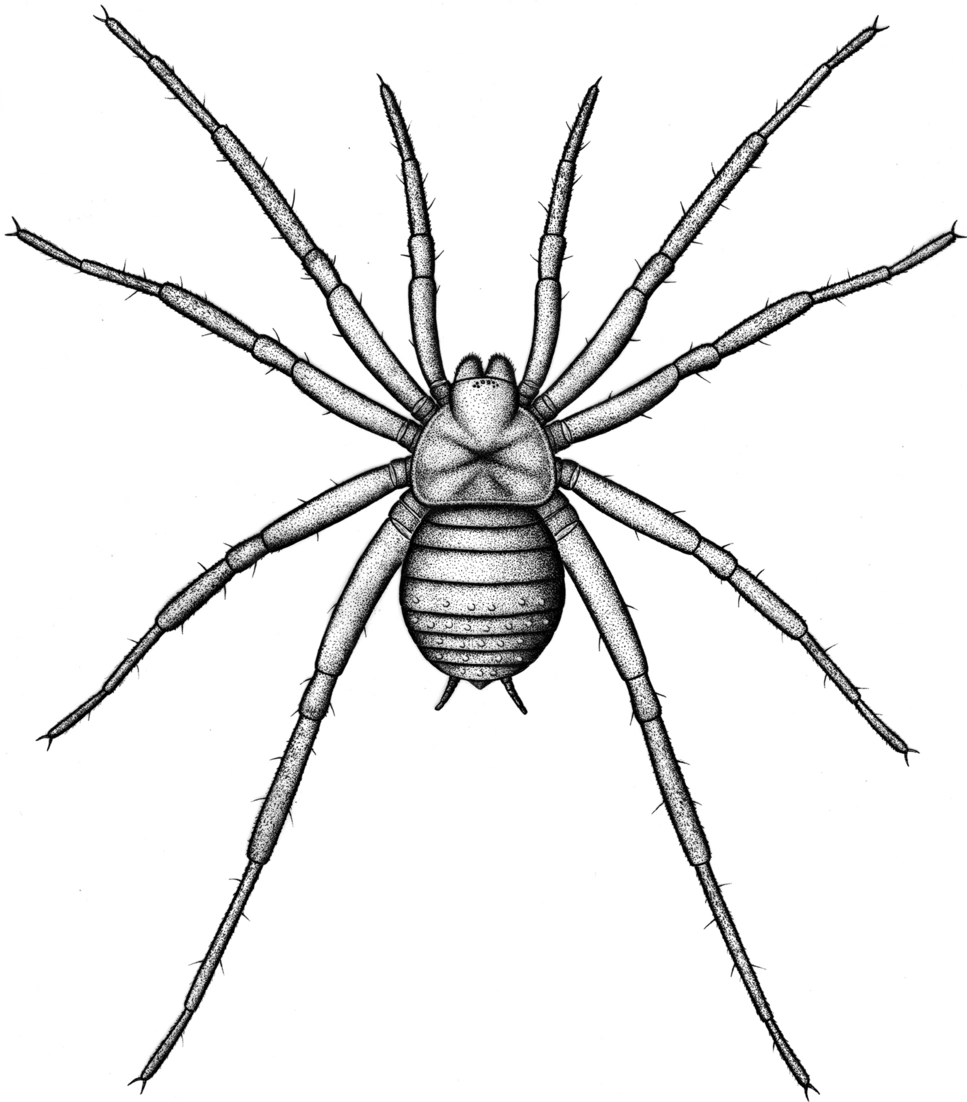
- Reconstruction of Arthrolycosa wolterbeeki

Scientific classification
- Domain: Eukaryota
- Kingdom: Animalia
- Phylum: Arthropoda
- Subphylum: Chelicerata
- Class: Arachnida
- Order: Araneae (?)
- Family: †Arthrolycosidae
- Genus: †Arthrolycosa; Harger, 1874

Species
- †A. antiqua Harger, 1874; †A. carcinoides; †A. wolterbeeki Dunlop, 2023

= Arthrolycosa =

Arthrolycosa Temporal range: Late Carboniferous to Late Permian

Extinct genus of spiders

Arthrolycosa (meaning wolf [spider] with joints) is an extinct genus of arachnids, possibly spiders, that lived about 300-250 million years ago.

Fossils have been found Mazon Creek USA, Piesberg in Germany and in the Kirov Oblast region, and the Kamensk-Shakhtinsky of Russia.

A. antiqua is estimated to have a body length of about 2.17 cm and may have preyed upon insects and other smaller animals that lived alongside them. A. wolterbeeki is the oldest spider known from Germany.

== External links & References ==
- Parker, Steve. Dinosaurus: the complete guide to dinosaurs. Firefly Books Inc, 2003. Pg. 75
