= Oscar Harger =

American paleontologist

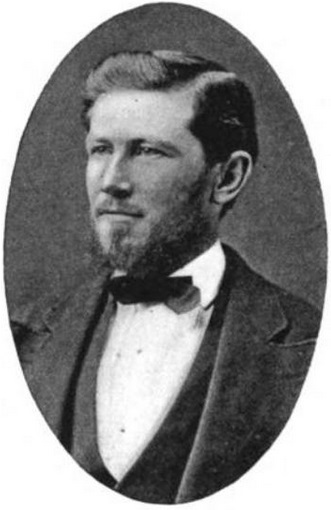
- Born: January 12, 1843; Oxford, Connecticut
- Died: November 6, 1887 (aged 44)
- Education: Yale College
- Scientific career
- Fields: Invertebrate zoology, paleontology

Oscar Harger (January 12, 1843 – November 6, 1887) was an American invertebrate zoologist and paleontologist known for his studies on isopods, and for his work as an paleontological assistant to Othniel Charles Marsh.

Harger, the son of Alfred Harger, a farmer and land surveyor of Huguenot descent, was born in Oxford, New Haven County, Conn, January 12, 1843. He graduated from Yale College in 1868. He was obliged throughout his college course to maintain himself by teaching and mathematical work, and he perhaps injured his health permanently by the severe economy which he practiced at that time. In his boyhood he had been an enthusiastic student of botany, and his success in this department of natural history led him on graduation to take up the study of zoology with Professor Verrill of the Sheffield Scientific School. He had already shown his special aptitude for original work and had begun important investigations, when he accepted in 1870 the position of Assistant in Paleontology under Professor Marsh, which he retained until his death. He continued, however, his investigations in invertebrate zoology, as long as his health allowed; of his publications in this field the most important is a valuable "Report on the Marine Isopoda of New England and the Adjacent Waters" (in the Report of the United States Commissioner of Fish and Fisheries for 1878). His best work and highest attainments, however, were in the department of vertebrate paleontology.

In 1879 he was attacked by cardiac trouble, which increased from year to year. He continued engaged in his regular duties, until prostrated by cerebral hemorrhage on Monday, October 31, 1887. He died on the following Sunday, November 6, in his 45th year.

He married, May 13, 1875, Jessie Craig, of New Haven, who survived him without children.

He is commemorated in the genus Hargeria, a fossil bird, and the species Miacis hargeri, an extinct carnivorous mammal.
