= Songthela =

Scientific classification
- Kingdom: Animalia
- Phylum: Arthropoda
- Subphylum: Chelicerata
- Class: Arachnida
- Order: Araneae
- Suborder: Mesothelae
- Family: Liphistiidae
- Subfamily: Heptathelinae
- Genus: Songthela; Ono, 2000

Species
- 40, see text

Genus of spiders

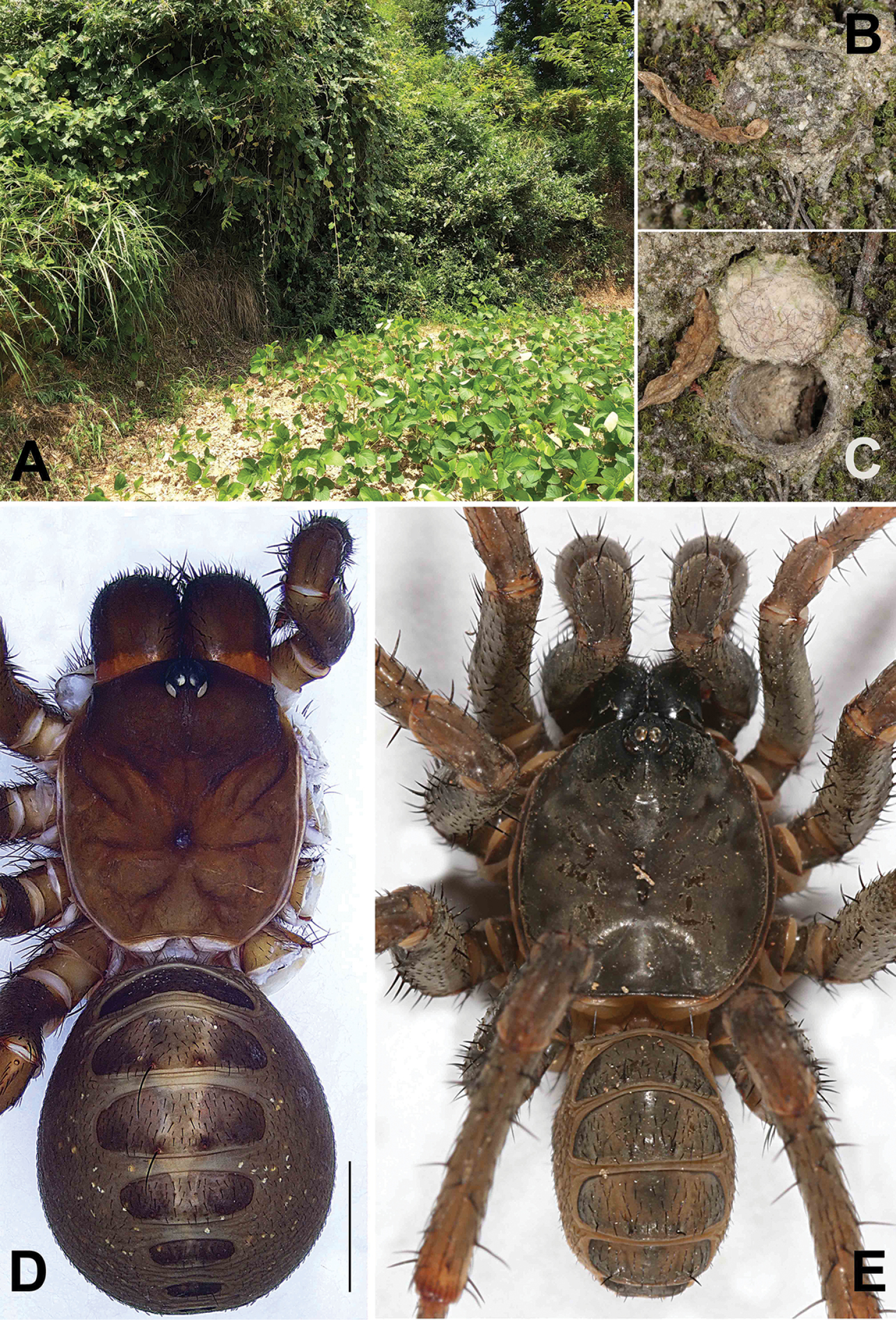
Microhabitat and general somatic morphology of Songthela huangyang sp. nov. (XUX–2018–082, female; XUX–2018–083, male) A microhabitat B, C the trapdoor with the door closed and open D, E dorsal view. Scale bar: 3 mm (D).

Songthela is a spider genus in the subfamily Heptathelinae, family Liphistiidae, with species found in China and Vietnam.

== Species list ==
As of November 2025, it contained the following species:

- Songthela anhua Zhang & Xu, 2023 – China
- Songthela aokoulong De.-Q. Li, Chen, Liu, Da.-Q. Li & Xu, 2022 – China
- Songthela bispina De.-Q. Li, Chen, Liu, Da.-Q. Li & Xu, 2022 – China
- Songthela bristowei (Gertsch, 1967) – China
- Songthela ciliensis (Yin, Tang & Xu, 2003) – China
- Songthela dapo De.-Q. Li, Chen, Liu, Da.-Q. Li & Xu, 2022 – China
- Songthela dongta Han & Xu, 2025 – China
- Songthela goulouensis (Yin, 2001) – China
- Songthela hangzhouensis (Chen, Zhang & Zhu, 1981) (type species) – China
- Songthela huangyang De. Q. Li, Liu, Da. Q. Li & Xu, 2020 – China
- Songthela huayanxi De.-Q. Li, Chen, Liu, Da.-Q. Li & Xu, 2022 – China
- Songthela jianganensis (Chen, Gao, Zhu & Luo, 1988) – China
- Songthela jinyun Chen, Liu, Li & Xu, 2022 – China
- Songthela lianhe De.-Q. Li, Chen, Liu, Da.-Q. Li & Xu, 2022 – China
- Songthela lingshang De.-Q. Li, Chen, Liu, Da.-Q. Li & Xu, 2022 – China
- Songthela liui Chen, De. Q. Li, Da. Q. Li & Xu, 2021 – China
- Songthela lixi Zhang & Xu, 2025 – China
- Songthela longbao Chen, Liu, Li & Xu, 2022 – China
- Songthela longhui Zhang & Xu, 2023 – China
- Songthela mangshan (Bao, Yin & Xu, 2003) – China
- Songthela multidentata De.-Q. Li, Chen, Liu, Da.-Q. Li & Xu, 2022 – China
- Songthela pluma Yu, Li & Zhang, 2018 – China
- Songthela pyriformis Li, Liu & Xu, 2019 – China
- Songthela sapana (Ono, 2010) – Vietnam
- Songthela serriformis Chen, Liu, Li & Xu, 2022 – China
- Songthela shei (Xu & Yin, 2001) – China
- Songthela shuyuan Li, Liu & Xu, 2019 – China
- Songthela tianmen De.-Q. Li, Chen, Liu, Da.-Q. Li & Xu, 2022 – China
- Songthela tianzhu Chen, De. Q. Li, Da. Q. Li & Xu, 2021 – China
- Songthela unispina De.-Q. Li, Chen, Liu, Da.-Q. Li & Xu, 2022 – China
- Songthela wangerbao Chen, Liu, Li & Xu, 2022 – China
- Songthela wosanensis (Wang & Jiao, 1995) – China
- Songthela xiangnan De. Q. Li, Liu, Da. Q. Li & Xu, 2020 – China
- Songthela xianningensis (Yin, Tang, Zhao & Chen, 2002) – China
- Songthela xiujian De.-Q. Li, Chen, Liu, Da.-Q. Li & Xu, 2022 – China
- Songthela yunnanensis (Song & Haupt, 1984) – China
- Songthela yuping Chen, De. Q. Li, Da. Q. Li & Xu, 2021 – China
- Songthela zhongpo Zhang & Xu, 2023 – China
- Songthela zimugang De.-Q. Li, Chen, Liu, Da.-Q. Li & Xu, 2022 – China
- Songthela zizhu De.-Q. Li, Chen, Liu, Da.-Q. Li & Xu, 2022 – China
