= Kyukichi Kishida =

Japanese zoologist

Kyukichi Kishida (岸田 久吉, Kishida Kyūkichi; 25 August 1888 in Maizuru – 4 October 1968 in Tokyo) was a Japanese zoologist, who published in arachnology, mammalogy, and herpetology.

He described several spider genera and species including :

- Heptathela
  - Heptathela kimurai (Kimura-gumo)
- Pireneitega
