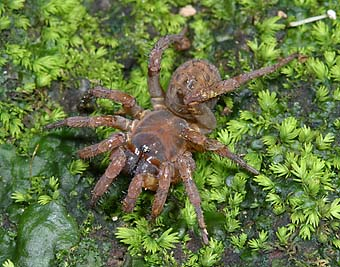
- Heptathela kimurai

Scientific classification
- Kingdom: Animalia
- Phylum: Arthropoda
- Subphylum: Chelicerata
- Class: Arachnida
- Order: Araneae
- Suborder: Mesothelae
- Family: Liphistiidae
- Subfamily: Heptathelinae; Kishida, 1923

Genera
- See text.

= Heptathelinae =

Family of spiders

Heptathelinae is a subfamily of spiders in the family Liphistiidae, the only extant family in the suborder Mesothelae. It has been treated as the separate family Heptathelidae. As of November 2025, merging Heptathelidae into Liphistiidae is accepted by the World Spider Catalog. The suborder Mesothelae contains the most basal living spiders.

== Taxonomy ==
The group was first proposed by Kyukichi Kishida in 1923, when he described a new genus, Heptathela, and suggested creating two tribes within the family Liphistiidae, with Heptathela placed in Heptatheleae. In 1939, Alexander Petrunkevitch raised the tribe Heptatheleae to a separate family, Heptathelidae. In 1985, Robert Raven reunited the two families, a view supported by Breitling in 2022. Other authors have maintained two separate families, a position previously accepted by the World Spider Catalog, but rejected as of November 2025. When not treated as separate families, the two groups are treated as subfamilies of the family Liphistiidae: subfamily Liphistiinae, containing only the genus Liphistius, and subfamily Heptathelinae.

=== Phylogeny ===
Molecular phylogenetic studies have repeatedly shown that the group is monophyletic, whether treated as a subfamily or a family. One possible relationship between the genera is shown in the following Bayesian cladogram from a 2023 study (numbers in parentheses give the number of units in the study):

- Mesothelae
  - (Liphistiinae)
    Liphistius
  - Heptathelidae (or Heptathelinae)
    - - Songthela (3)
      - - Vinathela (2)
        - Ganthela (6)
    - - Luthela (12)
      - - Qiongthela (2)
        - - Ryuthela (2)
          - Heptathela (2)

=== Genera ===
As of November 2025, seven genera were accepted, other than Liphistius, which is placed in the subfamily Liphistiinae.

- Ganthela Xu & Kuntner, 2015
- Heptathela Kishida, 1923
- Luthela Xu & Li, 2022
- Qiongthela Xu & Kuntner, 2015
- Ryuthela Haupt, 1983
- Songthela Ono, 2000
- Vinathela Ono, 2000

The genus Sinothela is considered a nomen dubium (dubious name).

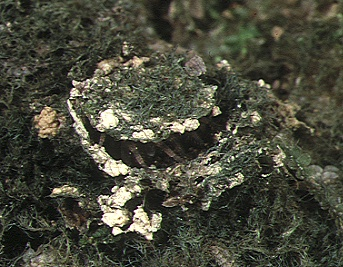
Burrow of Heptathela kimurai

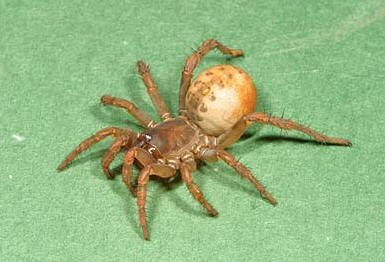
Ryuthela sasakii

== Description ==
Members of the Heptathelinae share features with the Liphistiinae. They are medium to large spiders. They have downward pointing, daggerlike chelicerae. Like other members of the suborder Mesothelae, and unlike all other extant spiders, they have a segmented series of plates (tergites) on the upper surface of all segments of the abdomen and their spinnerets are placed in the middle of the underside of the abdomen, rather than at the end. Their sternum (a plate on the underside of the cephalothorax) is narrow, and there is another smaller ventral plate (the sternite) between the fourth pair of legs. They respire by means of two pairs of book lungs. Unlike members of the Liphistiidae, the palp of the male lacks a tibial apophysis.

They live in burrows closed by trapdoors. Unlike members of the Liphistiinae, heptathelines do not construct signal lines radiating from the burrow.
