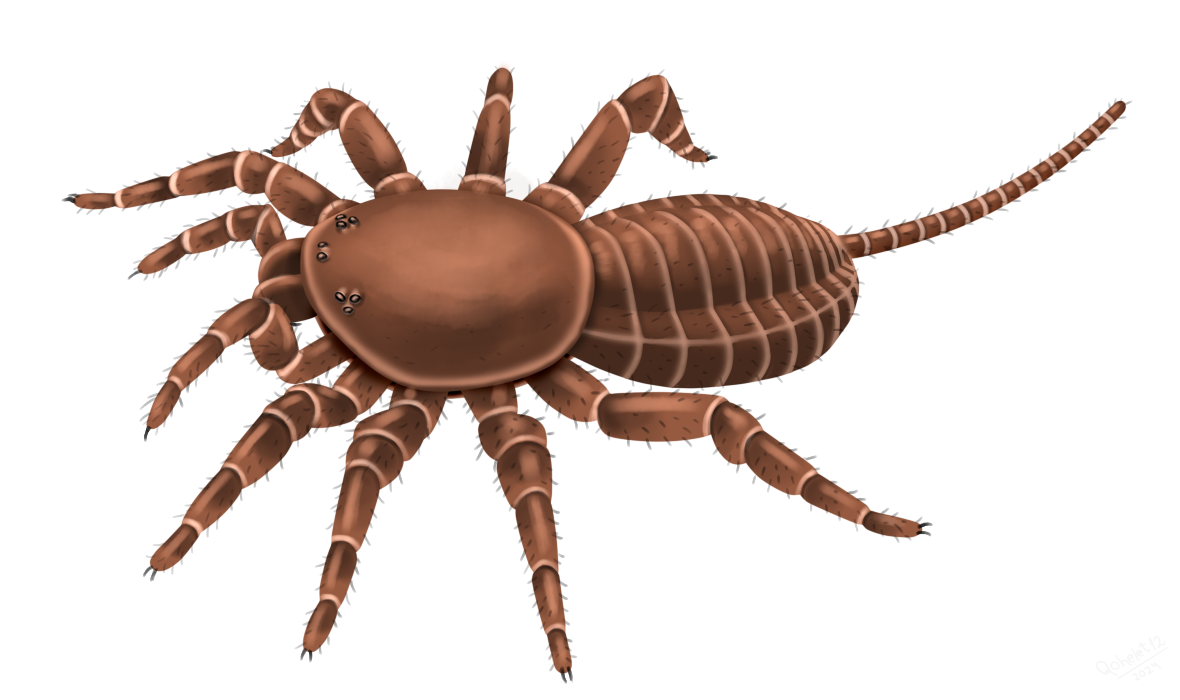
- Speculative reconstruction

Scientific classification
- Domain: Eukaryota
- Kingdom: Animalia
- Phylum: Arthropoda
- Subphylum: Chelicerata
- Class: Arachnida
- Clade: Tetrapulmonata
- Order: †Uraraneida
- Genus: †Attercopus; Selden et al., 1991
- Species: †A. fimbriunguis

Binomial name
- †Attercopus fimbriunguis (Shear et al., 1987)

= Attercopus =

Attercopus Temporal range: Givetian

Extinct genus of spider-like arachnids

Attercopus is an extinct genus of arachnids, containing one species Attercopus fimbriunguis, known from flattened cuticle fossils from the Panther Mountain Formation in Upstate New York. It is placed in the extinct order Uraraneida, spider-like animals able to produce silk, but which lacked true spinnerets and retained a segmented abdomen bearing a flagellum-like tail resembling that of a whip scorpion. They are thought to be close to the origins of spiders.

Its name is taken from the English dialect word attercop ("spider"), which came from Old English: attorcoppa ("poison-head"), from Old English: ator ("poison"), itself drawn from the Proto-Germanic *aitra- ("poisonous ulcer") and kopp- ("head"). In The Hobbit, J. R. R. Tolkien had Bilbo use attercop to insult attacking spiders, the insult possibly deriving from its meaning in Northern England dialect of "peevish, ill-natured person". Cop or cob had also come to mean spider, as in cobweb.

An important Early Devonian (about 390 million years ago) fossil example from Gilboa, New York, was originally described as a member of the extinct order Trigonotarbida and named Gelasinotarbus? fimbriunguis. It was later assigned to a new genus Attercopus and reinterpreted as the oldest, and most primitive, example of a true spider and described as being the first user of silk in animals.(Araneae). This hypothesis was based on the supposed presence of unique spider features such as silk-producing spinnerets and the opening of a venom gland on the fang of the chelicera.

Further study – based on new fossils from a comparable Devonian locality called South Mountain – and comparison with other material from the Permian of Russia, i.e., of Permarachne, indicates that Attercopus does not actually have spinnerets. The feature which looked like a tubular spinneret is actually a folded sheet of cuticle. It would, however, have produced silk from a series of silk gland openings, or spigots, located across plates on the underside of the abdomen. The opening for the venom gland is also a misinterpretation. A segmented tail, or flagellum, also belonged to this animal.

It seems unlikely that Attercopus spun webs, but it may have used its silk to wrap eggs, lay draglines or construct burrow walls. Attercopus fimbriunguis is not a spider, but it is probably close to the type of animals which did give rise to modern spiders today.
