= Opisthosoma =

Posterior body part of some arthropods

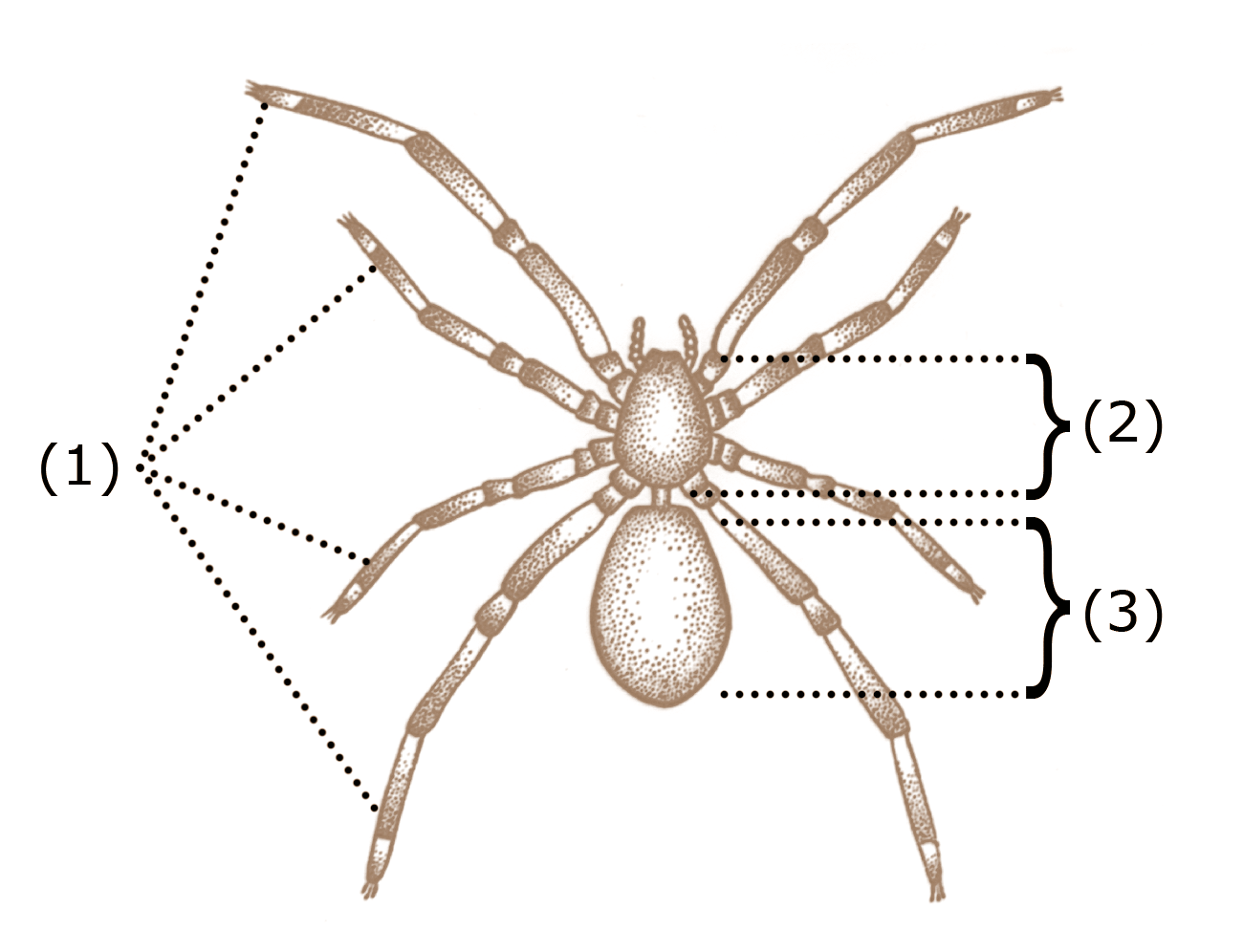
Arachnid anatomy: (1) four pairs of legs (2) prosoma (cephalothorax) (3) opisthosoma (abdomen)

The opisthosoma is the posterior part of the body in some arthropods, behind the prosoma (cephalothorax). It is a distinctive feature of the subphylum Chelicerata (arachnids, horseshoe crabs and others). It is similar in most respects to an abdomen (and is often referred to as such).

== Segments ==
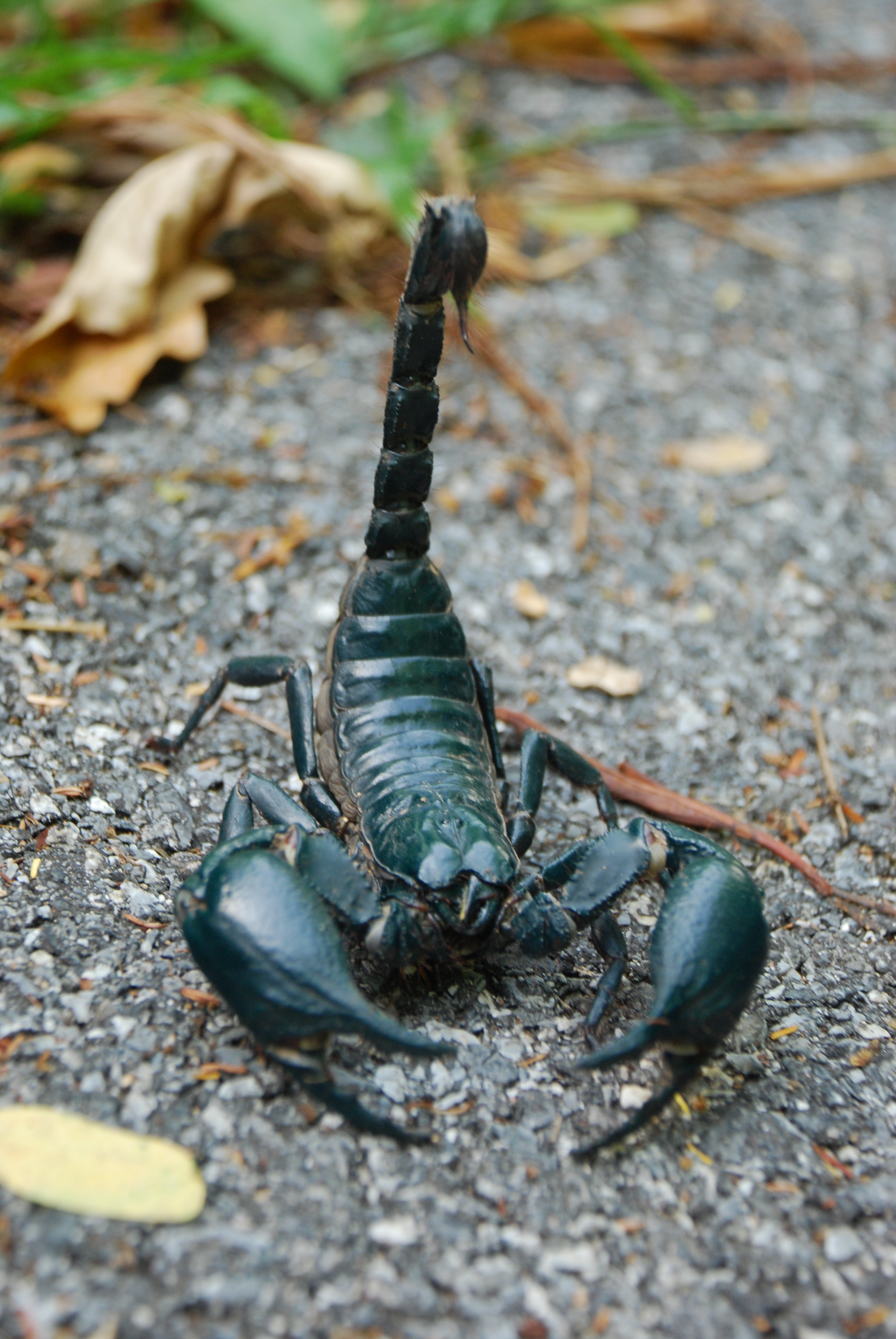
Asian forest scorpion

The number of segments and appendages on the opisthosoma vary. Scorpions have 13 segments, but the first is only seen during its embryological development. Other arachnids have fewer; harvestmen, for instance, have only ten.

In general, appendages are absent or reduced, although in horseshoe crabs they persist as large plate-like limbs, called opercula or branchiophores, bearing the book gills, and that function in locomotion and gas exchange. In most chelicerates the opisthosomal limbs are greatly reduced and persist only as specialized structures, such as the silk-producing spinnerets of spiders or the pectines of scorpions. In animals like whip scorpions and whip spiders the first two 'sternites' bearing the book lungs may actually be highly modified opisthosomal limbs.

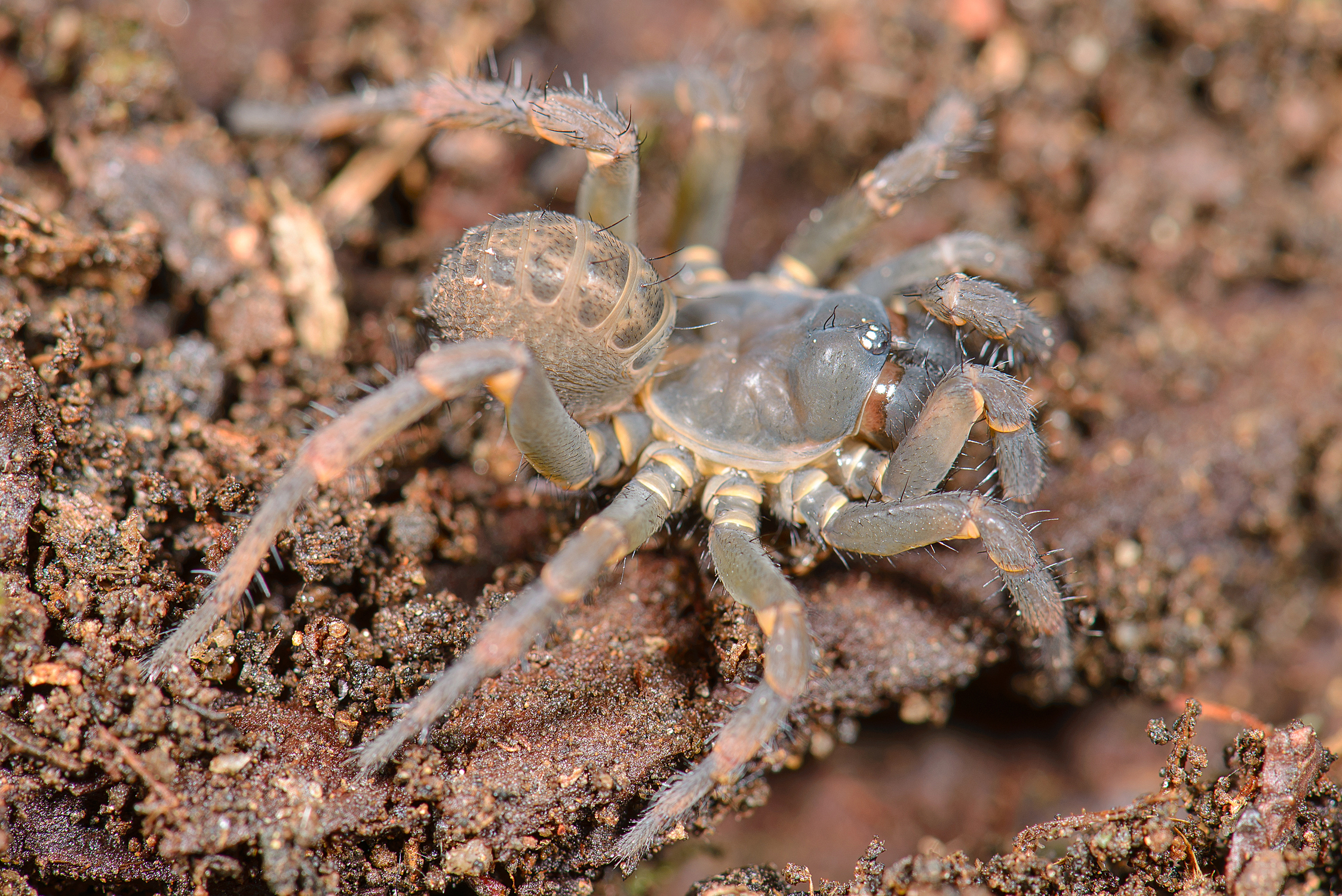
The mesothele Heptathela higoensis, with visible segmentation on its opisthosoma

Segmentation of the opisthosoma in adult spiders is generally not visible, but embryo spiders typically have 13 segments, the posterior segments being called the presegmental zone. The exception are the Mesothelae, a small group of spiders retaining ancestral characteristics. They split from other spiders around 300-445 million years ago, and they have a clearly segmented opisthosoma even in adult stages.
