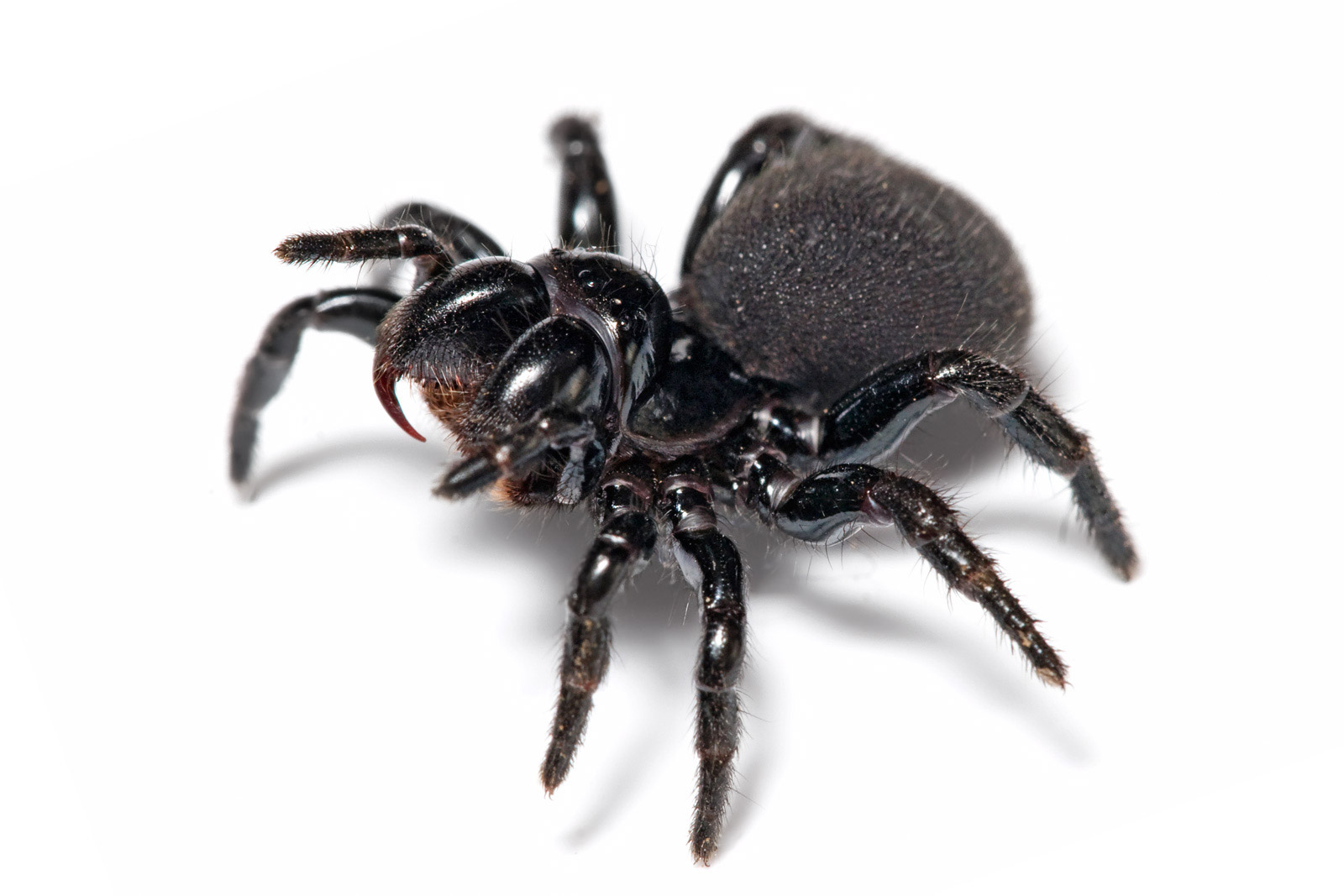
- Missulena bradleyi

Scientific classification
- Kingdom: Animalia
- Phylum: Arthropoda
- Subphylum: Chelicerata
- Class: Arachnida
- Order: Araneae
- Suborder: Opisthothelae; Pocock, 1892

Infraorders
- Araneomorphae; Mygalomorphae

= Opisthothelae =

Opisthothelae Temporal range: 247–present Ma

Suborder of spiders

Opisthothelae is a suborder of spiders within the order Araneae, containing Mygalomorphae and Araneomorphae, but excluding Mesothelae. The Opisthothelae are sometimes presented as an unranked clade and sometimes as a suborder of Araneae. In the latter case, Mygalomorphae and Araneomorphae are treated as infraorders.

- Araneae
  - Mesothelae
  - - Opisthothelae
      - Mygalomorphae
      - Araneomorphae

The creation of this taxon has been justified by the need to distinguish these spiders from the Mesothelae, which display more primitive characteristics. The characteristics that distinguish between the Mesothelae and Opisthothelae are:

- Mesothelae have a segmented abdomen with tergite plates, whereas Opisthothelae have fused abdominal segments and lack tergite plates.
- The almost total absence of ganglia in the abdomen of Opisthothelae.
- The almost median position of the spinnerets in the Mesothelae compared with the hindmost position of those of the Opistothelae.

== Description ==
Containing all extant species of spider, except for the more primitive Mesothelae, Opisthothelae is an incredibly diverse clade. Mygalomorphae contains tarantulas and similar species, which tend to have stout bodies and legs. Araneomorphae are more highly evolved, and often have a smaller body and slender legs.

Mygalomorphae have two pairs of book lungs, and have chelicerae that move vertically, allowing the spider to grasp its prey from above and below. Araneomorphae typically have one pair of book lungs, and chelicerae which move horizontally, allowing a firmer grip.

Lampshade spiders (family Hypochilidae) show some characteristics of Araneomorphae despite being mygalomorphs, and have fangs that can move diagonally. Distinguishing araneomorphs and mygalomorphs on first inspection is difficult unless the specimens are large enough to permit immediate examination of the fangs, although their differences in behavior can provide help for identification in the wild.
