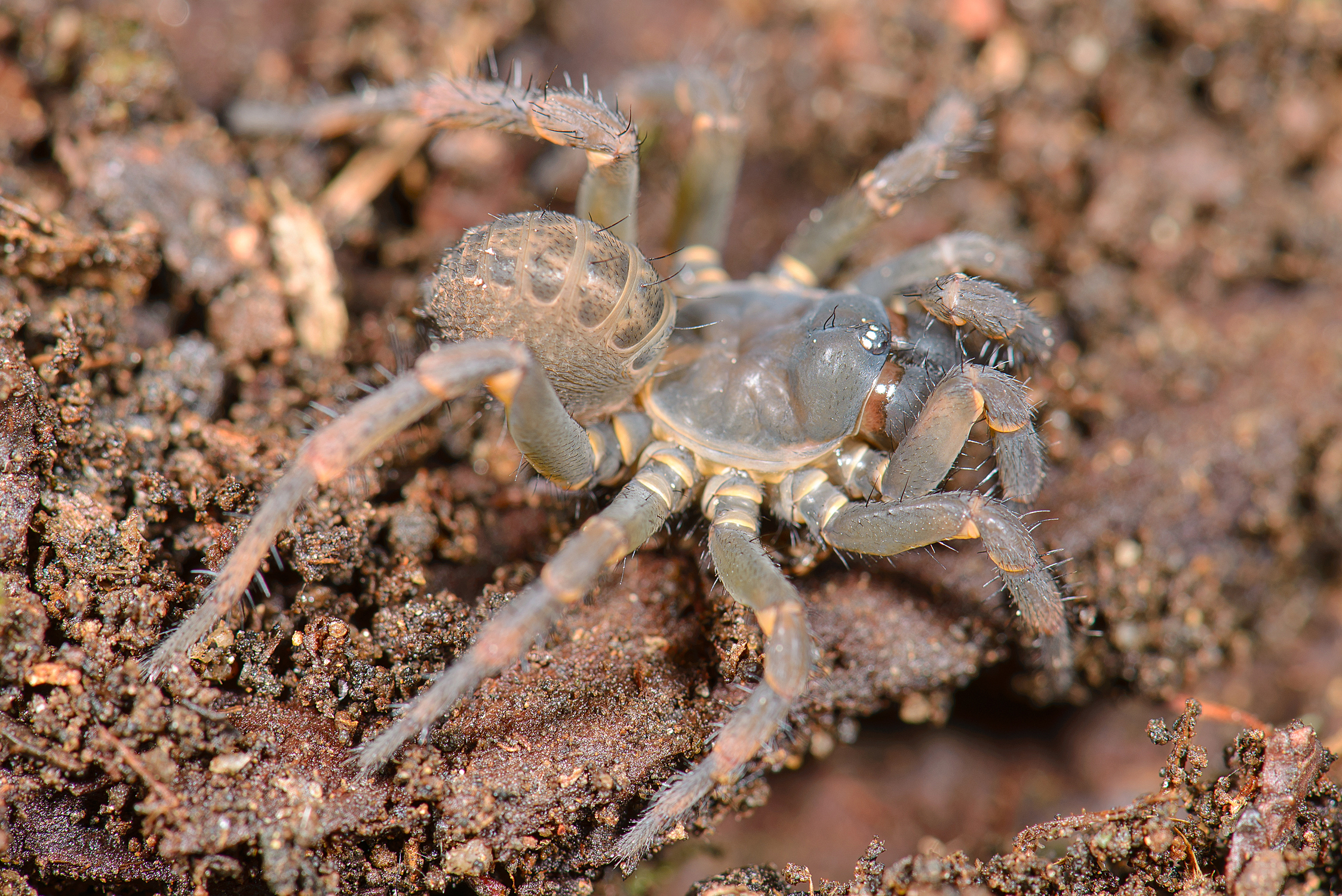
- Heptathela higoensis

Scientific classification
- Kingdom: Animalia
- Phylum: Arthropoda
- Subphylum: Chelicerata
- Class: Arachnida
- Order: Araneae
- Suborder: Mesothelae; Pocock, 1892

Subdivisions
- Liphistiidae Thorell, 1869; †Palaeothele; Possibly other fossils

= Mesothelae =

Mesothelae Temporal range: Pennsylvanian–Present

Suborder of spiders

The Mesothelae are a suborder of spiders (order Araneae). The division of extant members of the suborder into families has varied. A single extant family Liphistiidae may be accepted, with two subfamilies: Liphistiinae, containing only the genus Liphistius, and Heptathelinae, with seven genera. Alternatively, the two subfamilies may be treated as separate families, Liphistiidae and Heptathelidae. As of November 2025, the World Spider Catalog accepted the single family approach. There are also a number of extinct families.

This suborder is thought to form the sister group to all other living spiders, and to retain ancestral characters, such as a segmented abdomen with spinnerets in the middle and two pairs of book lungs. Extant members of the Mesothelae are medium to large spiders with eight eyes grouped on a tubercle. They are found only in China, Japan, and southeast Asia. The oldest known Mesothelae spiders are from the Carboniferous, over 300 million years ago.

== Taxonomy ==
Reginald Innes Pocock in 1892 was the first to realize that the exceptional characters of the genus Liphistius (the only member of the group then known) meant that it was more different from the remaining spiders than they were among themselves. Accordingly, he proposed dividing spiders into two subgroups, Mesothelae for Liphistius, and Opisthothelae for all other spiders. The names refer to the position of the spinning organs, which are in the middle of the abdomen in Liphistius and nearer the end in all other spiders. In Greek, μέσος (mesos) means "middle", and θήλα (thēla) "teat".

=== Phylogeny and classification ===
Pocock divided his Opisthothelae into two groups, which he called Mygalomorphae and Arachnomorphae (now Araneomorphae), implicitly adopting the phylogeny shown below.

- Araneae
  - Mesothelae
  - - Opisthothelae
      - Mygalomorphae
      - Arachnomorphae (Araneomorphae)

Pocock's approach was criticized by other arachnologists. Thus in 1923, Alexander Petrunkevitch rejected grouping mygalomorphs and araneomorphs into Opisthothelae, treating Liphistiomorphae (i.e. Mesothelae), Mygalomorphae and Arachnomorphae (Araneomorphae) as three separate groups. Others, such as W. S. Bristowe in 1933, put Liphistiomorphae and Mygalomorphae into one group, called Orthognatha, with Araneomorphae as Labidognatha:

- Araneae
  - Orthognatha
    - Liphistiomorphae (Mesothelae)
    - Mygalomorphae
  - Labidognatha
    Araneomorphae

In 1976, Platnick and Gertsch argued for a return to Pocock's classification, drawing on morphological evidence. Subsequent phylogenetic studies based on molecular data have vindicated this view. The accepted classification of spiders is now:

Order Araneae (spiders)

Suborder Mesothelae Pocock, 1892
Suborder Opisthothelae Pocock, 1892

Infraorder Mygalomorphae Pocock, 1892
Infraorder Araneomorphae Smith, 1902 (syn. Arachnomorphae Pocock, 1892)

=== Extant taxa ===
Initially the Mesothelae consisted of a single family, Liphistiidae. In 1923, the new genus Heptathela was described and placed in a separate tribe within Liphistiidae, Heptatheleae. In 1939, Alexander Petrunkevitch raised the tribe to a separate family, Heptathelidae. In 1985, Robert Raven reunited the two families, a view supported by Xu et al. in 2021, Breitling in 2022, and Sivayyapram et al. in 2024. Other authors have maintained two separate families. As of November 2025, the World Spider Catalog accepted the single family approach.

This produces the following internal classification of the Mesothelae:

- Family Liphistiidae
  - Subfamily Liphistiinae
    - Genus Liphistius Schiødte, 1849
  - Subfamily Heptathelinae
    - Genus Ganthela Xu & Kuntner, 2015
    - Genus Heptathela Kishida, 1923
    - Genus Luthela Xu & Li, 2022
    - Genus Qiongthela Xu & Kuntner, 2015
    - Genus Ryuthela Haupt, 1983
    - Genus Songthela Ono, 2000
    - Genus Vinathela Ono, 2000
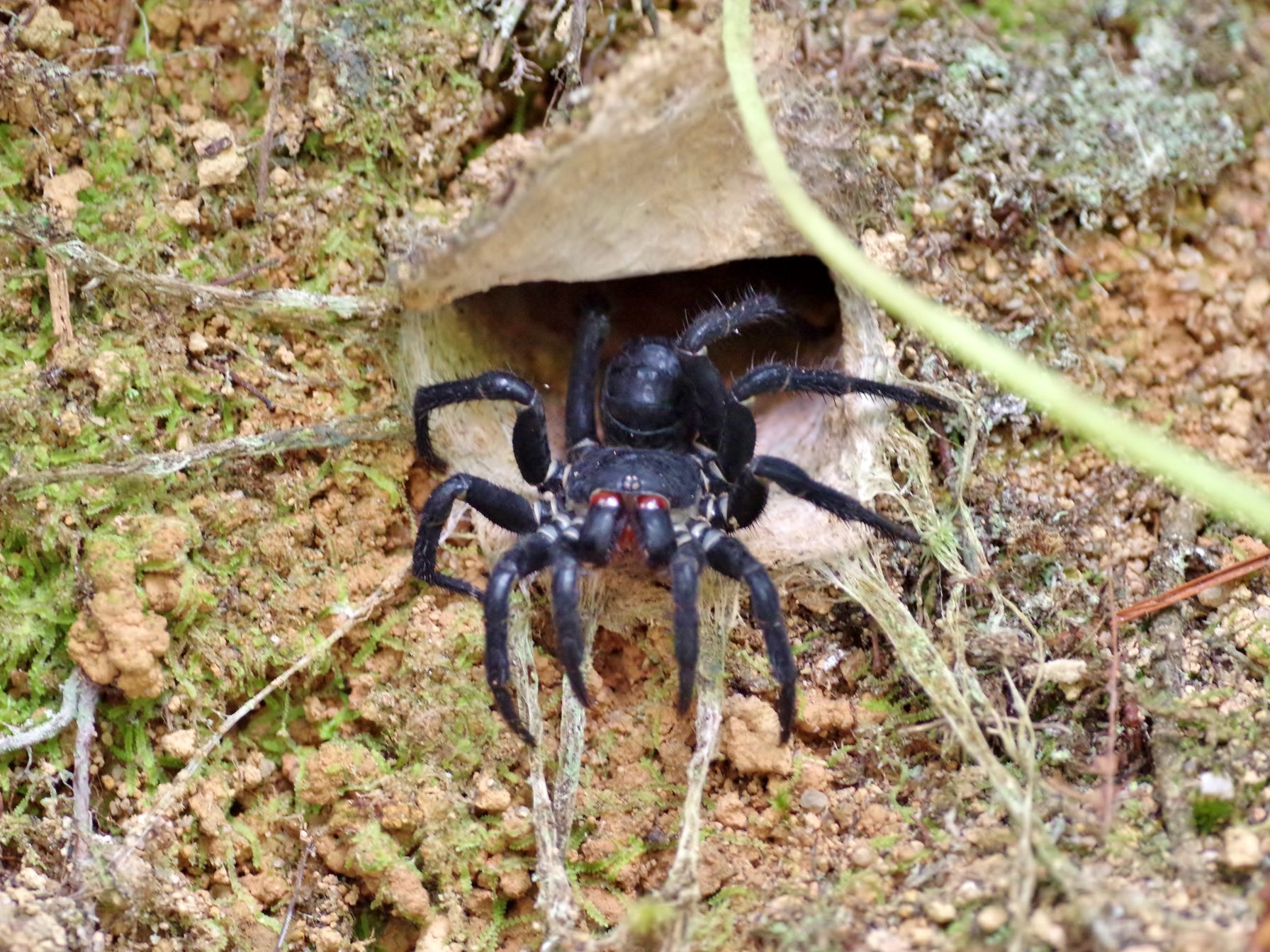
Liphistius malayanus, a member of the Liphistiinae

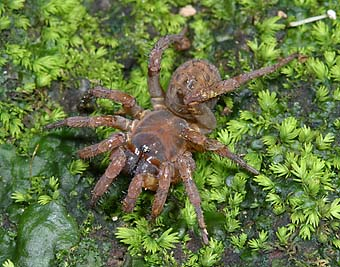
Heptathela kimurai, a member of the Heptathelinae

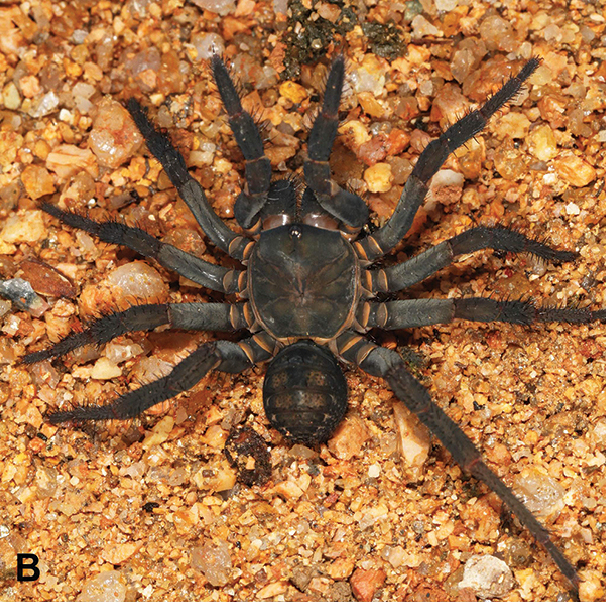
Qiongthela bawang, a member of the Heptathelinae

== Description ==
Members of Mesothelae have paraxial chelicerae, two pairs of coxal glands on the legs, eight eyes grouped on a nodule, two pairs of book lungs, and no endites on the base of the pedipalp. Most have at least seven or eight spinnerets near the middle of the abdomen. Lateral spinnerets are multi-segmented.

Recent Mesothelae are characterized by the narrow sternum on the ventral side of the cephalothorax (prosoma). Several plesiomorphic characteristics may be useful in recognizing these spiders: there are tergite plates on the dorsal side and the almost median position of the spinnerets on the ventral side of the opisthosoma. Although it has been claimed that they lack venom glands and ducts, which almost all other spiders have, subsequent works have demonstrated that at least some, possibly all, do in fact have both the glands and ducts. All Mesothelae have eight spinnerets in four pairs. Like mygalomorph spiders, they have two pairs of book lungs.

Species of Liphistius have 'fishing lines' in front of the entrances to the burrows that they construct, unlike members of the subfamily Heptathelinae. They also have a paired receptaculum (unpaired in Heptathelinae), and have a conductor in their palpal bulb. Their long palps can confusingly look like an extra pair of legs, a mistake also made of some solifugids.

== Distribution ==
Species of the sole extant family Liphistiidae are distributed in China, Southeast Asia (Laos, Malaysia, Myanmar, Thailand, and Vietnam), Sumatra, and Japan.

== Fossils ==
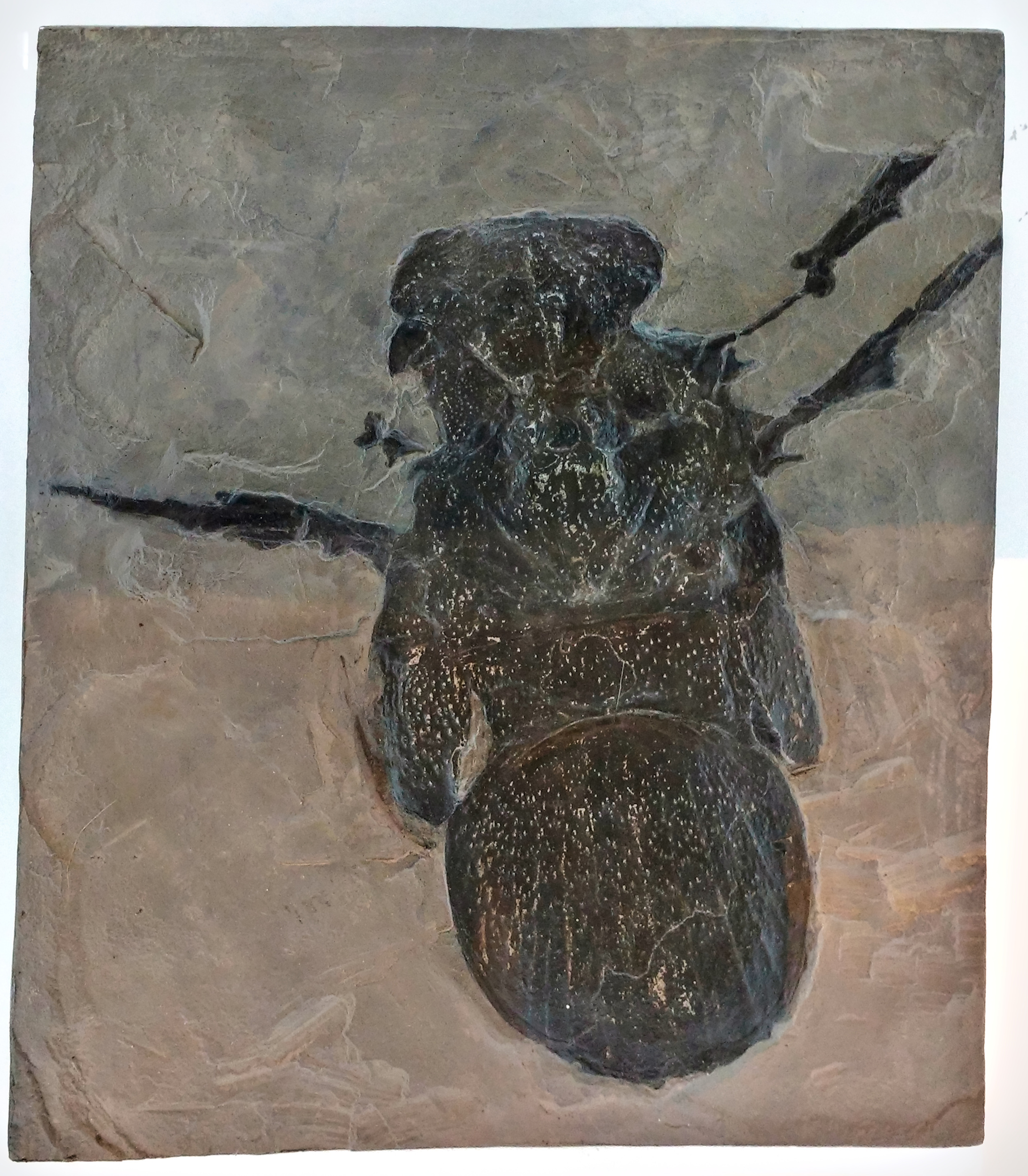
Originally, Megarachne (meaning "great spider" in Ancient Greek) was classified as a member of the Mesothelae, until further examination has proven to it being a species of eurypterid, an extinct arthropod.

A number of families and genera of fossil arthropods have been assigned to the Mesothelae, particularly by Alexander Petrunkevitch. However, Paul A. Selden has shown that most only have "the general appearance of spiders", with segmented abdomens (opisthosomae), but no definite spinnerets. These families include:

- †Arthrolycosidae Frič, 1904
- †Arthromygalidae Petrunkevitch, 1923
- †Pyritaraneidae Petrunkevitch, 1953
- †Palaeothele Selden, 2000 (unplaced in a family)

Between 2015 and 2019 six genera of Mesothele spider in four families were described from Late Cretaceous (Cenomanian) aged Burmese Amber in Myanmar. Cretaceothele (Cretaceothelidae) Burmathele (Burmathelidae), Parvithele, Pulvillothele (Parvithelidae) Intermesothele and Eomesothele (Eomesothelidae)
