= Amyciaea albomaculata =

Scientific classification
- Kingdom: Animalia
- Phylum: Arthropoda
- Subphylum: Chelicerata
- Class: Arachnida
- Order: Araneae
- Infraorder: Araneomorphae
- Family: Thomisidae
- Genus: Amyciaea
- Species: A. albomaculata

Binomial name
- Amyciaea albomaculata (O. Pickard-Cambridge, 1873)

Species of crab spider

Amyciaea albomaculata is a species of ant-mimicking crab spider in the family Thomisidae found in Australia. It is known to mimic the green tree ant, hunting them at dusk and night.

The upper-side of the abdomen has distinct white spots, forming two longitudinal lines. Two large round spots of black on the hind side of the dorsal abdomen.
