= Josa keyserlingi =

- Josa keyserlingi spider on a leaf

Scientific classification
- Kingdom: Animalia
- Phylum: Arthropoda
- Subphylum: Chelicerata
- Class: Arachnida
- Order: Araneae
- Infraorder: Araneomorphae
- Family: Anyphaenidae
- Genus: Josa
- Species: J. keyserlingi

Binomial name
- Josa keyserlingi (L. Koch, 1866)

Species of spider

Josa keyserlingi is a species of araneomorph spider in the family Anyphaenidae. It was originally described by German arachnologist Ludwig Carl Christian Koch in 1866 as Anyphaena keyserlingi.

== Taxonomy ==
The species was described by Ludwig Koch in 1866 as Anyphaena keyserlingi and was later transferred to the genus Josa.

== Distribution ==
Its known distribution is limited to Colombia and Brazil, although it may have a wider range. Current knowledge is based solely on confirmed records.
