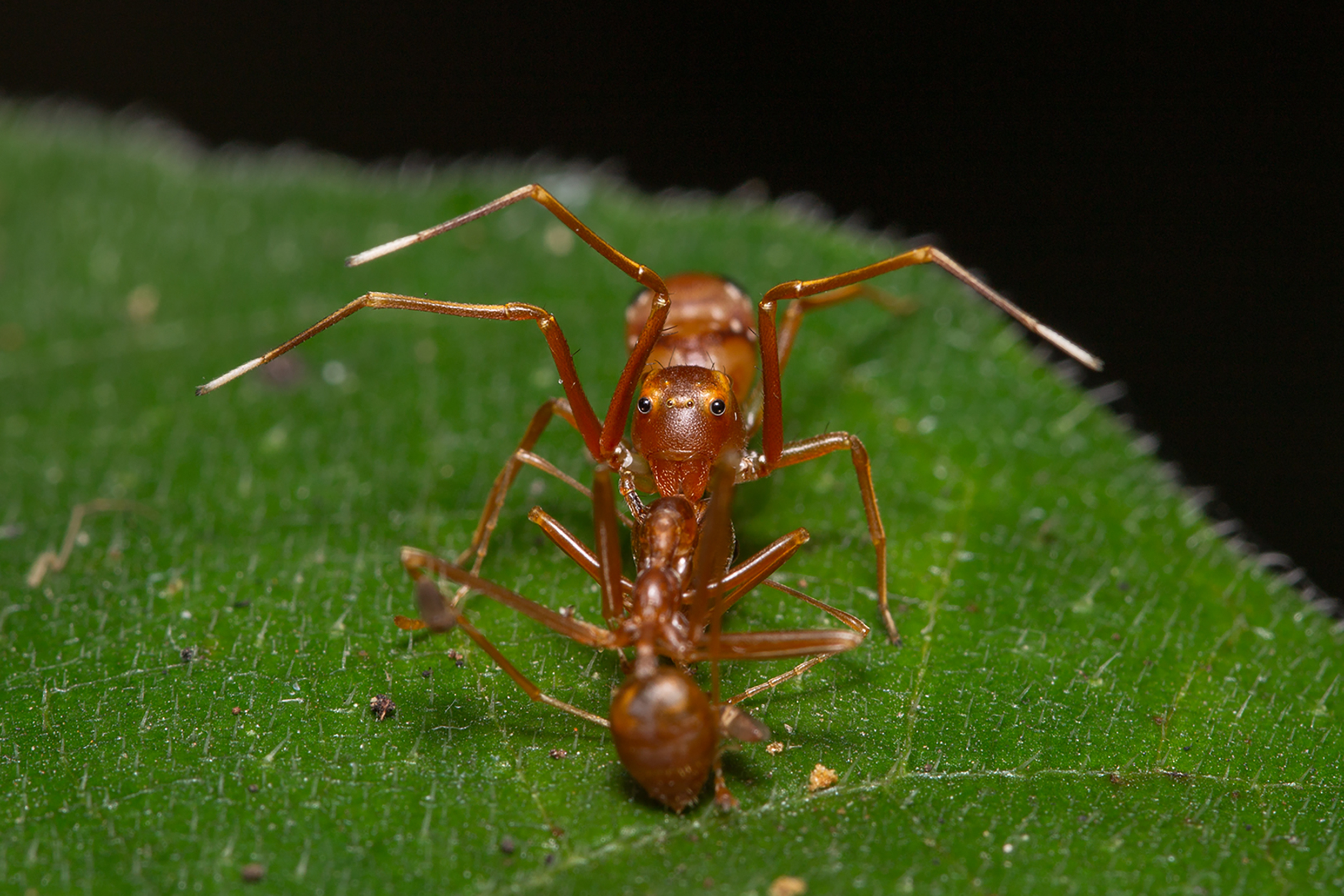
- feeding on weaver ant

Scientific classification
- Kingdom: Animalia
- Phylum: Arthropoda
- Subphylum: Chelicerata
- Class: Arachnida
- Order: Araneae
- Infraorder: Araneomorphae
- Family: Thomisidae
- Genus: Amyciaea
- Species: A. forticeps

Binomial name
- Amyciaea forticeps (O. Pickard-Cambridge, 1873)

Synonyms
- Amycle forticeps O. Pickard-Cambridge, 1873; Amyclea forticeps Badcock, 1918 (lapsus)

= Amyciaea forticeps =

Ant-like Crab Spider

Species of spider

Amyciaea forticeps is a species of ant-mimicking crab spider in the family Thomisidae. It is found across Asia, ranging from India and China to Malaysia.

== Description ==
A. forticeps is a distinctive spider with an unusual appearance that has been described as "Salticiform-looking" despite belonging to the crab spider family. The male measures approximately 2¼ lines (about 4.5 mm) in length.

The cephalothorax has a truncated appearance when viewed in profile, with the thoracic region greatly curtailed and the caput exaggerated. The normal grooves and indentations are barely visible. The cephalothorax is orange-yellow in color with a few erect black bristles within the ocular area.

The eye arrangement is notable, with the eyes positioned on tubercles of a paler color than the surrounding surface. The outer quadrangle of eyes is rather large, with the tubercles supporting them being particularly strong. This quadrangle is wider than it is long, and nearly square in shape. The inner quadrangle is smaller, with four minute eyes, but maintains similar proportions to the larger one.

The legs are long and slender, primarily orange-yellow in color, except for the tarsi and outer sides of certain joints, which are whitish cream-colored. The second pair of legs are slightly longer than the first, while the third pair are much the shortest. Each tarsus terminates with two curved pectinated claws.

The pedipalps are short and similar in color to the legs. The palpal organs are simple and encircled by a black filiform spine.

The abdomen is twice the length of the cephalothorax and narrow, with the posterior portion being the broadest and rather rounded. It is dull pale yellow with blackish brown markings on the fore part and sides, including some transverse angular lines and curved oblique rows of pale spots formed by small tufts of pale hairs.

== Distribution and habitat ==
A. forticeps has a wide distribution across Asia, having been recorded from India, China, and Malaysia.

== Taxonomy ==
The species was originally described by O. Pickard-Cambridge in 1873 as Amycle forticeps. It was later transferred to the genus Amyciaea by Eugène Simon in 1895. The species is considered the type species of the genus Amyciaea.
