= Anterior median =

Anterior median may refer to:

- Anterior median fissure of the spinal cord
- Anterior median fissure of the medulla oblongata
- Anterior median line
- Anterior spinal veins also known as anterior median spinal veins
