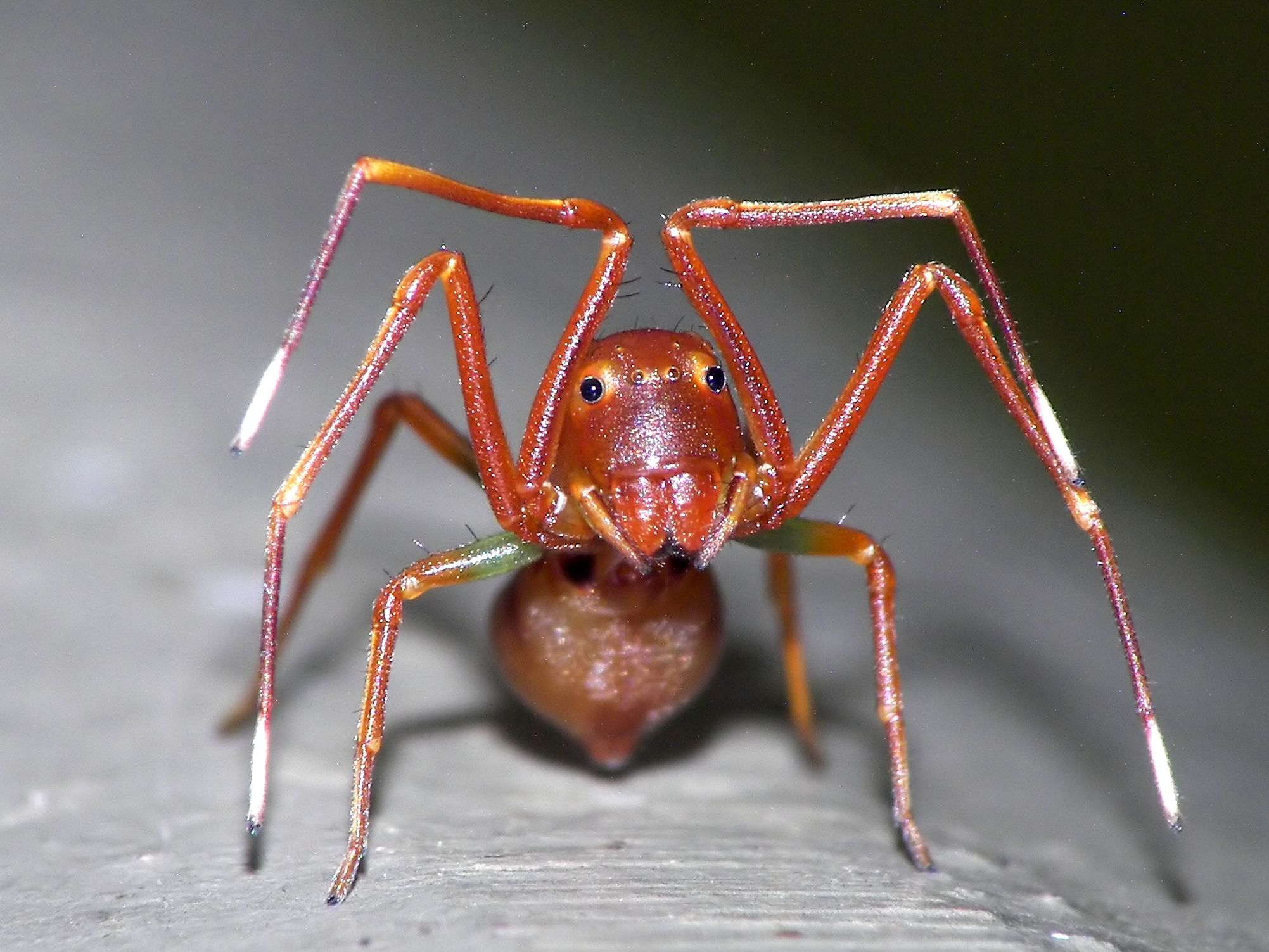
- Amyciaea lineatipes

Scientific classification
- Kingdom: Animalia
- Phylum: Arthropoda
- Subphylum: Chelicerata
- Class: Arachnida
- Order: Araneae
- Infraorder: Araneomorphae
- Family: Thomisidae
- Genus: Amyciaea; Simon, 1885

Type species
- A. forticeps (O. Pickard-Cambridge, 1873)

Species
- 5, see text

= Amyciaea =

Genus of spiders

Amyciaea is a genus of ant mimicking crab spiders that was first described by Eugène Louis Simon in 1885.

They mimic weaver ants, their preferred prey.

== Description ==
Spiders in this genus are generally around 5mm in length. They don't have the typical leg position or strong distinction between fore and hind legs typical of thomisids, instead holding the front two legs in the air to mimic antennae. The abdomen bears two dark spots which resemble the compound eyes of Weaver ants. Despite the "antennae" and "eyes" being on opposite sides of the body, the camouflage is effective enough to fool surrounding animals.

== Behaviour ==
Spiders in this genus live and build their nests in foliage, and on the twigs of trees and bushes. They hang by a silken thread at a safe distance from the ant path to avoid accidental interactions, and feed on the ants by biting their head, instantly paralysing them.

The males of this genus exhibit bridging behaviour when searching for a mate; similar to ballooning, they release a thread of silk behind them, however unlike ballooning they wait for the thread to catch on another plant part, then use it as a bridge to crawl across. This allows them to avoid travelling on the ground, where there may be predators.

== Species ==
As of June 2020 it contains five species, found in Africa, Asia, and Oceania:

- Amyciaea albomaculata (O. Pickard-Cambridge, 1874) – Australia, New Guinea
- Amyciaea forticeps (O. Pickard-Cambridge, 1873) (type) – India, China to Malaysia
- Amyciaea hesperia Simon, 1895 – Sierra Leone, Ivory Coast
- Amyciaea lineatipes O. Pickard-Cambridge, 1901 – Singapore, Indonesia (Sumatra)
- Amyciaea orientalis Simon, 1909 – Vietnam

== Distribution ==
Amyciaea species are found in the rainforests of Africa, Southern Asia, New Guinea and Australia.

== See also ==
- List of Thomisidae species
