= Josa (spider) =

Scientific classification
- Kingdom: Animalia
- Phylum: Arthropoda
- Subphylum: Chelicerata
- Class: Arachnida
- Order: Araneae
- Infraorder: Araneomorphae
- Family: Anyphaenidae
- Genus: Josa; Keyserling, 1891

Type species
- J. lutea (Keyserling, 1878)

Species
- 19, see text

Synonyms
- Gayenella; Haptisus; Olbophthalmus; Pelayo

Genus of spiders

Josa is a genus of South American anyphaenid sac spiders first described by Eugen von Keyserling in 1891. It is a senior synonym of "Gayenella", "Haptisus", "Olbophthalmus", and "Pelayo".

== Species ==
As of October 2026 it contains nineteen species:

- Josa analis (Simon, 1897)—Venezuela
- Josa andesiana (Berland, 1913)—Ecuador
- Josa berlandi Martínez, Kochalka, Cabra-García & Ramírez, 2025—Colombia
- Josa bryantae (Caporiacco, 1955)—Venezuela
- Josa calilegua Ramírez, 2003—Argentina
- Josa chazaliae (Simon, 1897)—Colombia
- Josa gounellei (Simon, 1897)—Brazil
- Josa keyserlingi (L. Koch, 1866)—Colombia, Brazil
- Josa laeta (O. Pickard-Cambridge, 1896)—Costa Rica
- Josa lojensis (Berland, 1913)—Ecuador
- Josa lutea (Keyserling, 1878)—Colombia, Ecuador
- Josa maura (Simon, 1897)—Venezuela
- Josa nadineae Martínez, Kochalka, Cabra-García & Ramírez, 2025—Colombia
- Josa nigrifrons (Simon, 1897)—Mexico to Bolivia
- Josa olimpica Martínez, Kochalka, Cabra-García & Ramírez, 2025—Colombia
- Josa personata (Simon, 1897)—Ecuador
- Josa riveti (Berland, 1913)—Ecuador, Bolivia
- Josa samaria Martínez, Kochalka, Cabra-García & Ramírez, 2025—Colombia
- Josa simoni (Berland, 1913)—Ecuador
