= Anterior median line =

Anatomical line along the front of the body

Details

Identifiers
- Latin: linea mediana anterior
- TA98: A01.2.00.012
- TA2: 60
- FMA: 20310

The anterior median line is a sagittal line on the anterior of the head and torso running at midline.
