= List of Deinopidae species =

This page lists all described species of the spider family Deinopidae accepted by the World Spider Catalog as of December 2020:

== Asianopis ==
Asianopis Lin & Li, 2020

- A. aruensis (Roewer, 1938) — Indonesia (Aru Is.)
- A. celebensis (Merian, 1911) — Indonesia (Sulawesi)
- A. dumogae (Merian, 1911) — Indonesia (Sulawesi)
- A. goalparaensis (Tikader & Malhotra, 1978) — India
- A. konplong (Logunov, 2018) — Vietnam
- A. liukuensis (Yin, Griswold & Yan, 2002) — India, China
- A. wangi Lin & Li, 2020 — China (Hainan)
- A. wuchaoi Lin & Li, 2020 — China
- A. zhuanghaoyuni Lin & Li, 2020 (type) — China

== † Deinopedes ==
† Deinopedes Wunderlich, 2017 — Cretaceous Burmese amber

- † D. tranquillus Wunderlich, 2017

== Deinopis ==
Deinopis

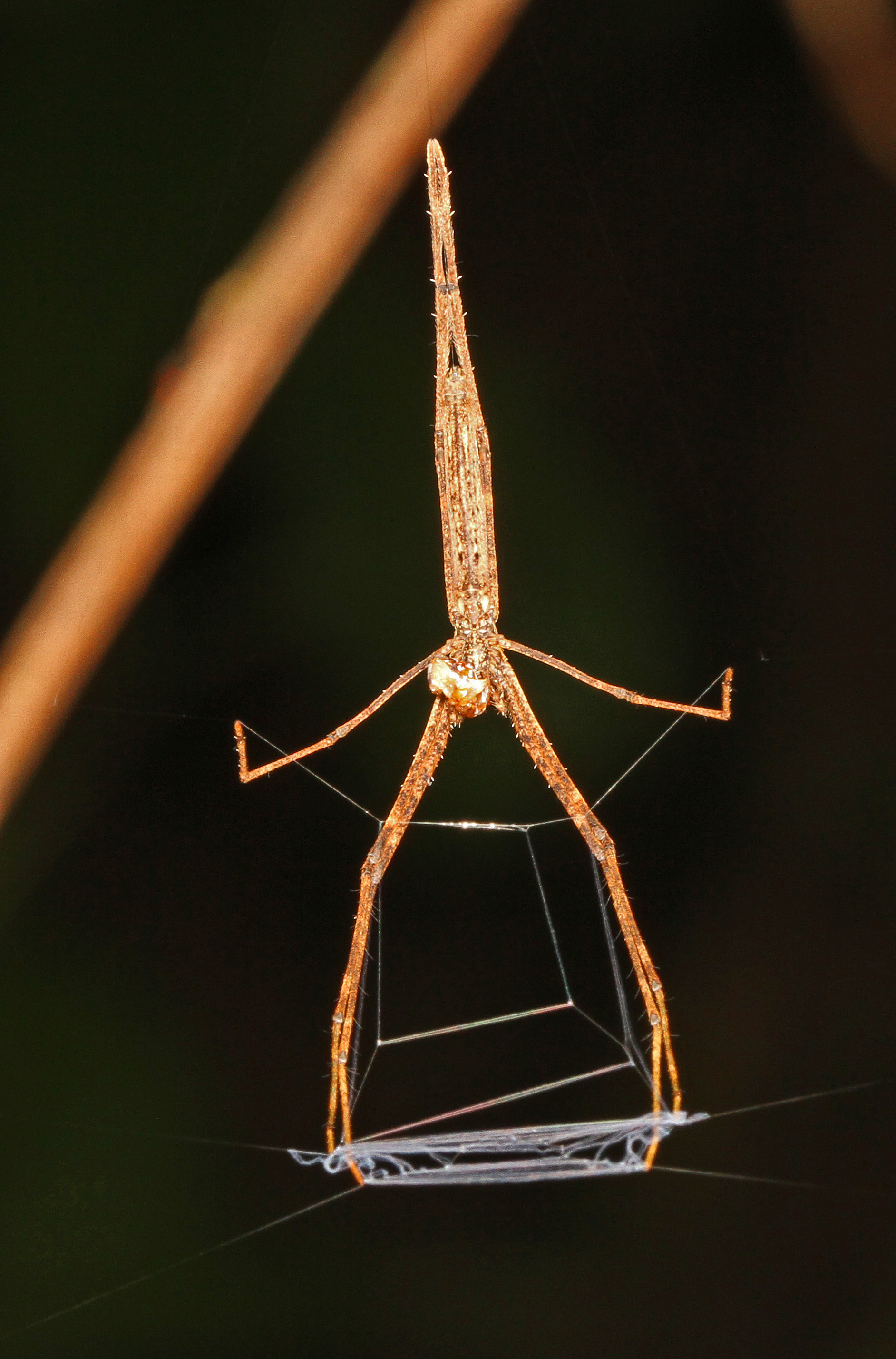
Deinopis longipes

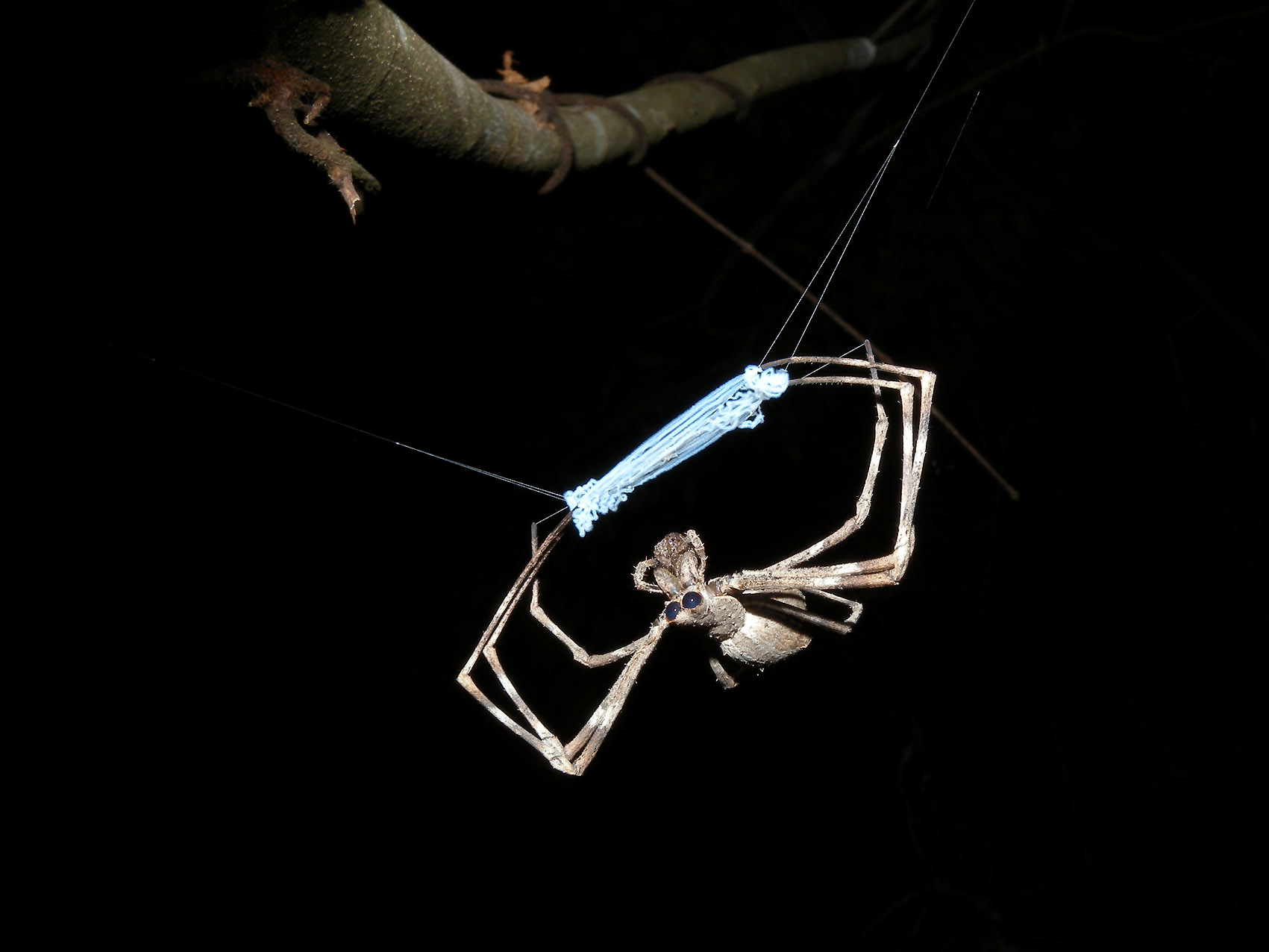
Deinopis madagascariensis

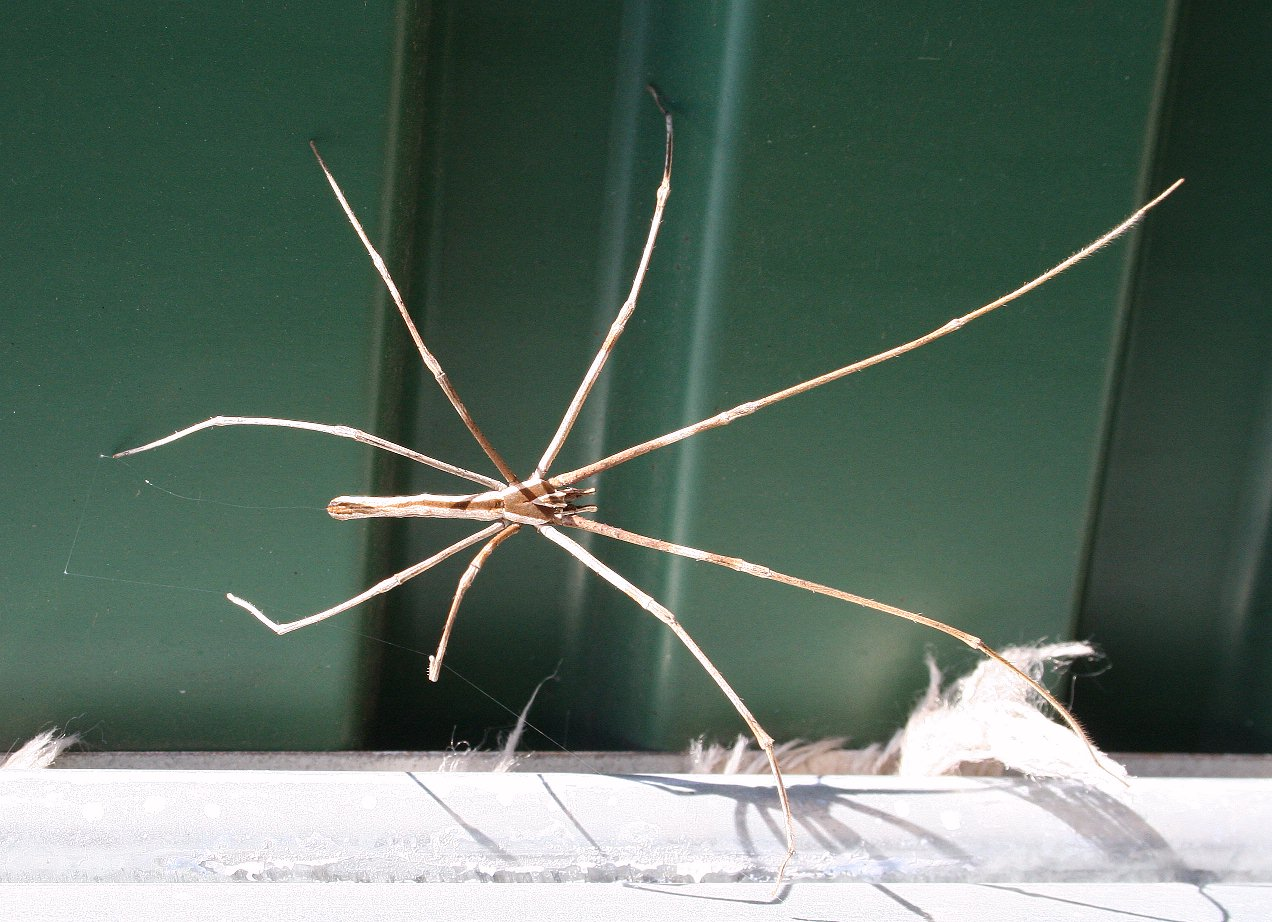
Deinopis subrufa

Deinopis MacLeay, 1839

- D. amica Schiapelli & Gerschman, 1957 — Argentina, Uruguay
- D. anchietae Brito Capello, 1867 — West Africa, Angola, South Africa
- D. armaticeps Mello-Leitão, 1925 — Brazil
- D. aspectans Pocock, 1900 — Cameroon, Equatorial Guinea, DR Congo, South Africa
- D. aurita F. O. Pickard-Cambridge, 1902 — Mexico
- D. biaculeata Simon, 1906 — Brazil
- D. bituberculata Franganillo, 1930 — Cuba
- D. bucculenta Schenkel, 1953 — Venezuela
- D. camela Thorell, 1881 — New Guinea
- D. cornigera Gerstaecker, 1873 — Ethiopia, Rwanda, Burundi, Tanzania, South Africa
- D. cylindracea C. L. Koch, 1846 — Colombia
- D. cylindrica Pocock, 1898 — Mozambique, South Africa
- D. diabolica Kraus, 1956 — El Salvador
- D. fasciata L. Koch, 1879 — Australia (Queensland)
- D. fasciculigera Simon, 1909 — Vietnam
- D. fastigata Simon, 1906 — Brazil
- D. giltayi Lessert, 1930 — Congo
- D. granadensis Keyserling, 1879 — Colombia
- D. guasca Mello-Leitão, 1943 — Brazil
- D. guianensis Taczanowski, 1874 — French Guiana
- D. guineensis Berland & Millot, 1940 — Guinea
- D. kollari Doleschall, 1859 — Myanmar, Indonesia (Ambon)
- D. labangan Barrion-Dupo & Barrion, 2018 — Philippines
- D. lamia MacLeay, 1839 (type) — Cuba, Puerto Rico
- D. longipalpula Strand, 1913 — Central Africa
- D. longipes F. O. Pickard-Cambridge, 1902 — Mexico to Panama
- D. luzonensis Barrion-Dupo & Barrion, 2018 — Philippines
- D. madagascariensis Lenz, 1886 — Madagascar
- D. mediocris Kulczyński, 1908 — New Guinea
- D. ornata Pocock, 1902 — Ethiopia
- D. pallida Mello-Leitão, 1939 — Brazil
- D. pardalis Simon, 1906 — Brazil
- D. plurituberculata Mello-Leitão, 1925 — Brazil
- D. ravida L. Koch, 1878 — Australia (Queensland)
- D. reticulata (Rainbow, 1899) — New Guinea
- D. rodophthalma Mello-Leitão, 1939 — Brazil
- D. schomburgki Karsch, 1878 — Australia (South Australia)
- D. schoutedeni Giltay, 1929 — Congo
- D. seriata Simon, 1906 — Brazil
- D. spinosa Marx, 1889 — USA, St. Vincent, Venezuela
- D. subrufa L. Koch, 1878 — Australia (Queensland, New South Wales, Tasmania), New Zealand
- D. tabida L. Koch, 1879 — Australia (Queensland)
- D. tuboculata Franganillo, 1926 — Cuba
- D. unicolor L. Koch, 1878 — Australia (Western Australia)

== Menneus ==
Menneus

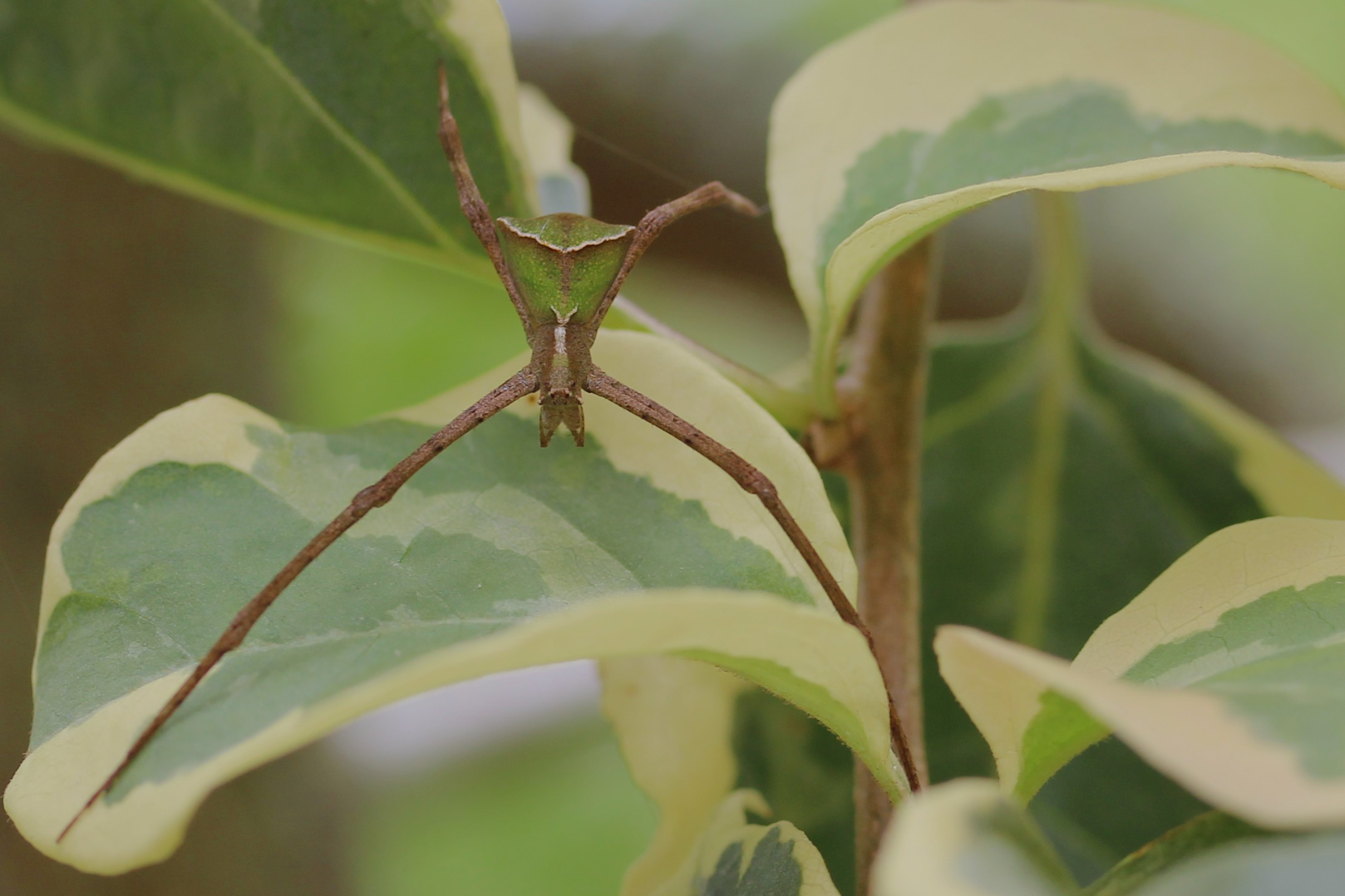
Menneus nemesio

Menneus Simon, 1876

- M. aussie Coddington, Kuntner & Opell, 2012 — Australia (Queensland, New South Wales), New Caledonia
- M. bituberculatus Coddington, Kuntner & Opell, 2012 — Australia (Queensland), possibly New Guinea
- M. camelus Pocock, 1902 — South Africa
- M. capensis (Purcell, 1904) — South Africa
- M. darwini Coddington, Kuntner & Opell, 2012 — Tanzania
- M. dromedarius Purcell, 1904 — South Africa, Madagascar
- M. nemesio Coddington, Kuntner & Opell, 2012 — Australia (New South Wales)
- M. neocaledonicus (Simon, 1888) — New Caledonia
- M. quasimodo Coddington, Kuntner & Opell, 2012 — Australia (Western Australia)
- M. samperi Coddington, Kuntner & Opell, 2012 — East Africa
- M. superciliosus (Thorell, 1881) — Australia (Queensland, New South Wales)
- M. tetragnathoides Simon, 1876 (type) — Angola, Malawi, Tanzania
- M. trinodosus Rainbow, 1920 — Australia (Queensland, New South Wales, Lord Howe Is.)
- M. wa Coddington, Kuntner & Opell, 2012 — Australia (Western Australia)
- † M. pietrzeniukae Wunderlich, 2004
