= D. spinosa =

D. spinosa may refer to:

- Dalea spinosa, a tree species
- Deinopis spinosa, a net-casting spider species in the genus Deinopis
- Dennstaedtia spinosa, a fern species in the genus Dennstaedtia
- Desfontainia spinosa, a medicinal plant species
- Diaea spinosa, a crab spider species in the genus Diaea
- Didelta spinosa, a flowering plant species in the genus Didelta
- Diplolepis spinosa, a plant species in the genus Diplolepis
- Drypis spinosa, a moth food plant species

== See also ==
- Spinosa (disambiguation)
