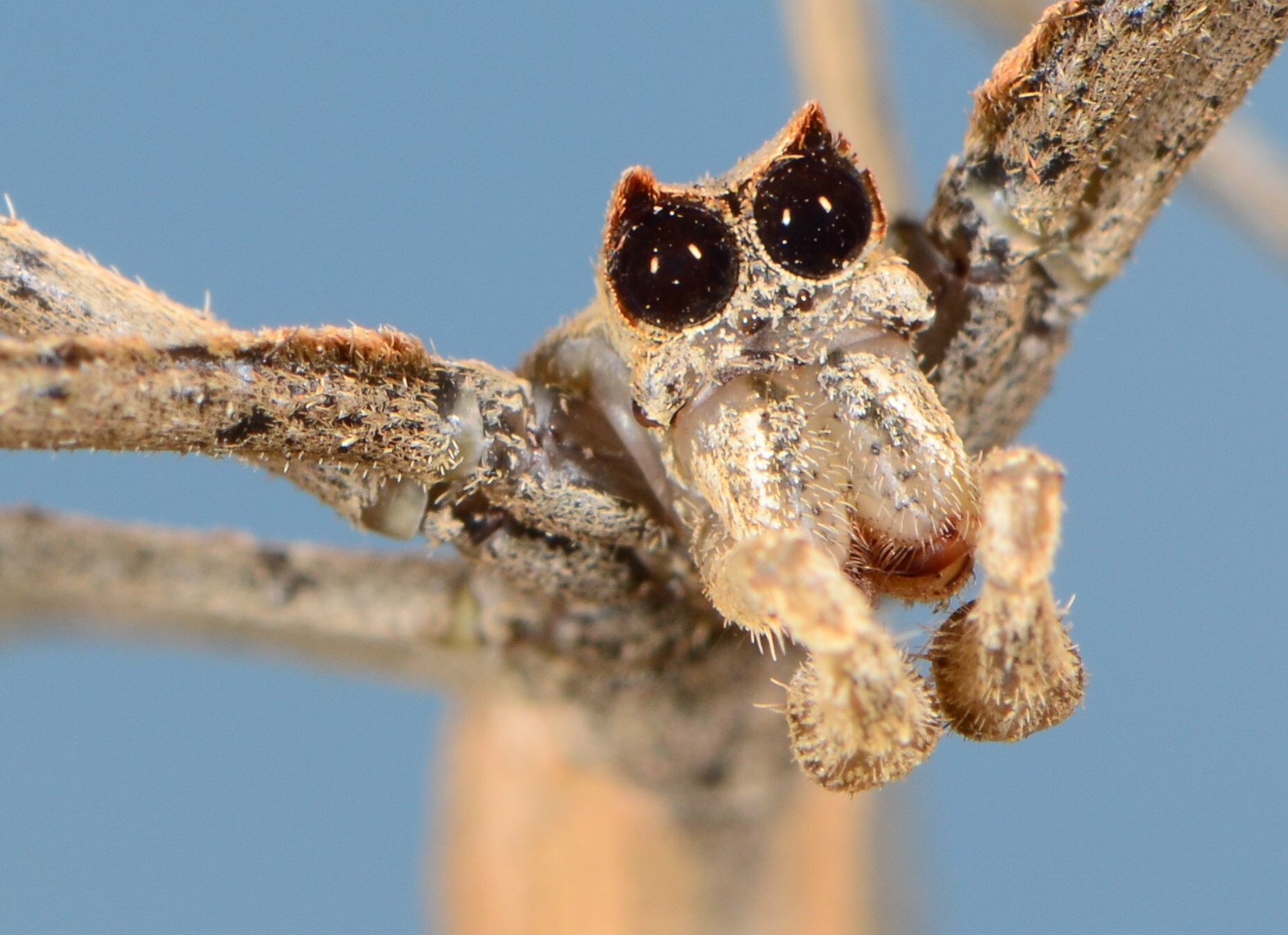
- Male
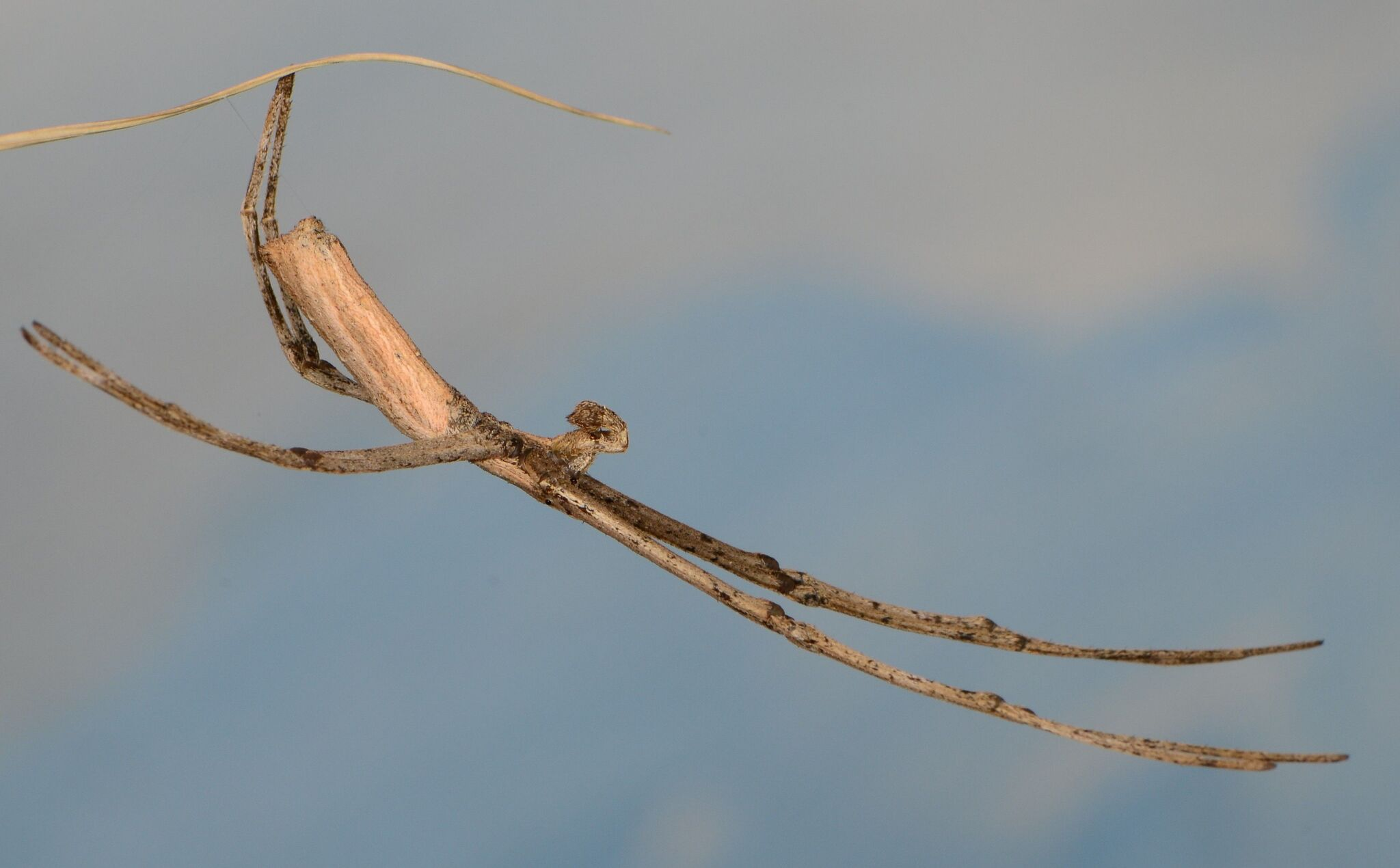
- Male

Scientific classification
- Kingdom: Animalia
- Phylum: Arthropoda
- Subphylum: Chelicerata
- Class: Arachnida
- Order: Araneae
- Infraorder: Araneomorphae
- Family: Deinopidae
- Genus: Asianopis
- Species: A. cornigera

Binomial name
- Asianopis cornigera (Gerstaecker, 1873)

Synonyms
- Deinopis cornigera Gerstaecker, 1873; Dinopis bubalus Simon, 1890; Deinopis ruandanicus Strand, 1913

= Asianopis cornigera =

Short-Palp Ogre-Faced Spider

Species of spider

Asianopis cornigera is a species of spider in the family Deinopidae. It is found across several African countries including Ethiopia, Rwanda, Burundi, Tanzania, and South Africa, and is commonly known as the Short-Palp Ogre-Faced Spider.

== Etymology ==
The species epithet "cornigera" is derived from Latin, meaning "horn-bearing."

== Distribution ==
Asianopis cornigera was originally described from Tanzania. In South Africa, it has been recorded from KwaZulu-Natal, Limpopo, and North West provinces at altitudes ranging from 29 to 1,341 m above sea level.

== Habitat and ecology ==
The species is a web dweller that constructs small, rectangular expandable webs at night using cribellate silk, which is held with the front legs. The spiders are cryptic by day, resting with their bodies pressed against tree bark. In South Africa, it has been sampled from the Indian Ocean Coastal Belt and Savanna biomes.

== Description ==
Asianopis cornigera is known from both sexes. Males have a dark body with a distinct dark V-shaped marking on the carapace and possess characteristic horn-bearing white setae projecting dorsally over the eyes.

== Conservation ==
Asianopis cornigera is listed as Least Concern by the South African National Biodiversity Institute due to its wide African distribution. In South Africa, it is protected in three protected areas: Lhuvhondo Nature Reserve, Lekgalameetse Nature Reserve, and Medikwe Game Reserve.

== Taxonomy ==
The species was originally described by Gerstaecker in 1873 from Tanzania. It was transferred from the genus Deinopis to Asianopis by Chamberland et al. in 2022.
