= Asianopis aspectans =

Conservation status
- Least Concern (SANBI Red List)

Scientific classification
- Kingdom: Animalia
- Phylum: Arthropoda
- Subphylum: Chelicerata
- Class: Arachnida
- Order: Araneae
- Infraorder: Araneomorphae
- Family: Deinopidae
- Genus: Asianopis
- Species: A. aspectans

Binomial name
- Asianopis aspectans (Pocock, 1900)

Synonyms
- Deinopis aspectans Pocock, 1900

Species of spider

Asianopis aspectans is a species of spider in the family Deinopidae. It is found across several African countries including Cameroon, Equatorial Guinea, Democratic Republic of the Congo, and South Africa.

== Etymology ==
The species epithet "aspectans" is derived from Latin, meaning "looking at" or "observing."

== Distribution ==
Asianopis aspectans was originally described from the banks of the Benito River in Equatorial Guinea. In South Africa, it has been recorded from KwaZulu-Natal, Limpopo, and Mpumalanga provinces at altitudes ranging from 18 to 840 metres above sea level.

== Habitat and ecology ==
The species inhabits low vegetation and constructs small, expandable webs that it casts over prey. In South Africa, it has been sampled from the Savanna biome.

== Description ==
Asianopis aspectans is distinguished by having a carapace without white bands, unlike related species. The species is known from females, though undescribed males have been photographed.

== Conservation ==
Asianopis aspectans is listed as Least Concern by the South African National Biodiversity Institute due to its wide African distribution, despite being rare in South Africa with a limited extent of occurrence.

== Taxonomy ==
The species was originally described by Reginald Innes Pocock in 1900 from Equatorial Guinea. It was transferred from the genus Deinopis to Asianopis by Chamberland et al. in 2022.
