= Diplolepis =

Diplolepis may refer to:

- Diplolepis (wasp), a gall wasp genus in the family Cynipidae
- Diplolepis (plant), a plant genus in the family Asclepiadaceae
