= Asianopis cylindrica =

Conservation status
- Least Concern (SANBI Red List)

Scientific classification
- Kingdom: Animalia
- Phylum: Arthropoda
- Subphylum: Chelicerata
- Class: Arachnida
- Order: Araneae
- Infraorder: Araneomorphae
- Family: Deinopidae
- Genus: Asianopis
- Species: A. cylindrica

Binomial name
- Asianopis cylindrica (Pocock, 1898)

Synonyms
- Deinopis cylindricus Pocock, 1898; Dinopis stauntoni Pocock, 1902

Species of spider

Asianopis cylindrica is a species of spider in the family Deinopidae. It is found in Mozambique and South Africa.

== Distribution ==
Asianopis cylindrica was originally described from Durban, South Africa. It is a southern African endemic known from Mozambique and South Africa. In South Africa, it occurs in five provinces at altitudes ranging from 6 to 1,585 m above sea level.

== Habitat and ecology ==
The species is a web dweller that builds small, rectangular expandable webs made with cribellate silk and held with the front legs. When prey comes within reach, the spider expands the web by five to six times the original size and throws it onto the prey. The spiders are cryptic by day, resting with their bodies pressed against tree bark. In South Africa, it has been sampled from the Indian Ocean Coastal Belt, Grassland, and Savanna biomes.

== Description ==
Asianopis cylindrica is known from both sexes. It can be distinguished by having femur I less than three times the length of the carapace, and in males, the palp is longer than the carapace.

== Conservation ==
Asianopis cylindrica is listed as Least Concern by the South African National Biodiversity Institute due to its wide geographical distribution. It is protected in five protected areas including Ndumo Game Reserve, Tembe Elephant Park, and Makalali Nature Reserve.

== Taxonomy ==
The species was originally described by Reginald Innes Pocock in 1898 from Durban. It was transferred from the genus Deinopis to Asianopis by Chamberland et al. in 2022.
