= Asianopis anchietae =

Conservation status
- Least Concern (SANBI Red List)

Scientific classification
- Kingdom: Animalia
- Phylum: Arthropoda
- Subphylum: Chelicerata
- Class: Arachnida
- Order: Araneae
- Infraorder: Araneomorphae
- Family: Deinopidae
- Genus: Asianopis
- Species: A. anchietae

Binomial name
- Asianopis anchietae (Brito Capello, 1867)

Synonyms
- Deinopis anchietae Brito Capello, 1867; Deinopis bubo Brito Capello, 1867

Species of spider

Asianopis anchietae is a species of spider in the family Deinopidae. It is found in Angola and South Africa.

== Etymology ==
The species is named after José Alberto de Oliveira Anchieta, a Portuguese explorer and naturalist who collected specimens in Angola during the 19th century.

== Distribution ==
Asianopis anchietae was originally described from Angola and has a wider African distribution. In South Africa, it has been recorded from KwaZulu-Natal and Mpumalanga provinces at altitudes ranging from 219 to 225 metres above sea level.

== Habitat and ecology ==
The species inhabits low vegetation and constructs small, expandable webs that it casts over prey. In South Africa, it has been sampled from the Indian Ocean Coastal Belt and Savanna biomes.

== Description ==
Asianopis anchietae is known from both sexes. Females have a basal enlargement on femur I, and males possess frontal eye horns.

== Conservation ==
Asianopis anchietae is listed as Least Concern by the South African National Biodiversity Institute due to its wide African range, despite being rare in South Africa with a limited extent of occurrence.

== Taxonomy ==
The species was originally described by Félix António de Brito Capello in 1867 from Angola. It was transferred from the genus Deinopis to Asianopis by Chamberland et al. in 2022.
