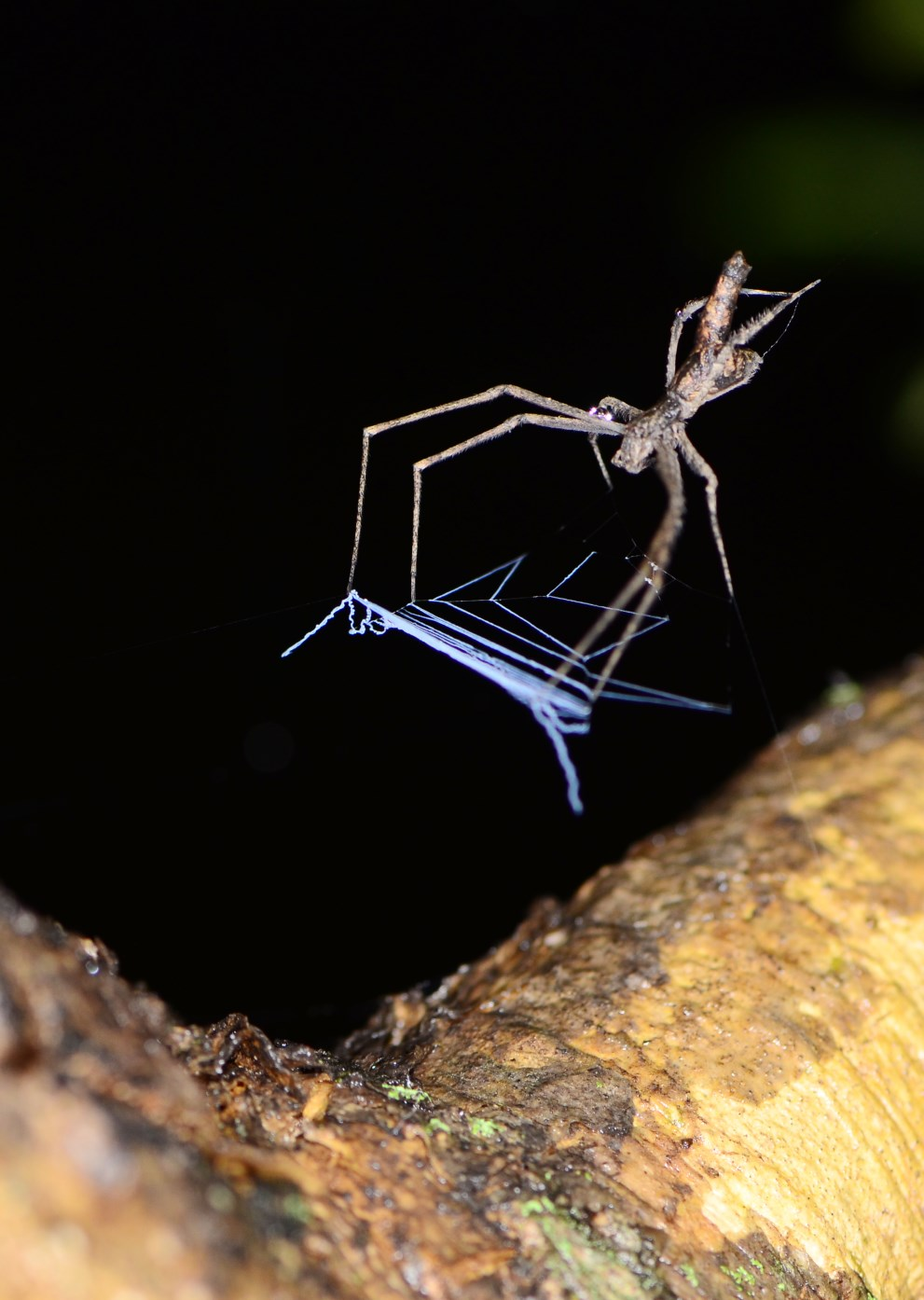
- M. dromedarius from Durban
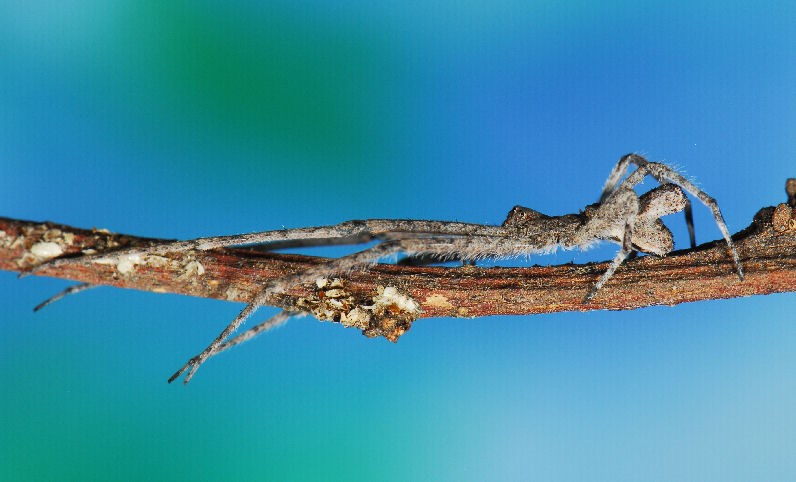

Conservation status
- Least Concern (SANBI Red List)

Scientific classification
- Kingdom: Animalia
- Phylum: Arthropoda
- Subphylum: Chelicerata
- Class: Arachnida
- Order: Araneae
- Infraorder: Araneomorphae
- Family: Deinopidae
- Genus: Menneus
- Species: M. dromedarius

Binomial name
- Menneus dromedarius Purcell, 1904

= Menneus dromedarius =

Dromedary Net Casting Spider

Species of spider endemic to South Africa and Madagascar

Menneus dromedarius, also known as the dromedarus net-casting spider, is a species of net-casting spider in the family Deinopidae. It is endemic to the afrotropical regions of South Africa and Madagascar.

== Distribution ==
M. dromedarius is found in four provinces in South Africa, in fynbos, forest, grassland and Albany thicket biomes. Specimens were found in Bathurst in the Eastern Cape, oNgoye Forest in KZN, Barberton in Mpumalanga, the Diepwalle Forest in the Garden Route National Park, and in Kleinmond in the Western Cape.

In Madagascar, it was found in Berenty Reserve.

== Habitat and ecology ==
The species constructs small, rectangular expandable webs made with cribellate silk and holds them with their front legs. The spiders are cryptic by day, resting with their bodies pressed against vegetation. It has been sampled from the Fynbos, Forest, Grassland, and Thicket biomes.

== Description ==
Menneus dromedarius is known from both sexes.

Compared to a related genus Asianopis, an ogre-faced net-caster, Menneus have less prominent forward facing eyes and subtle greenish brown to grey patterning. The males are smaller and even more slender and stick-like than the females, and can differ from them in their colour and patterning.

== Conservation ==
Menneus dromedarius is listed as Least Concern by the South African National Biodiversity Institute due to its wide geographical range spanning South Africa and Madagascar. The species is protected in two forest stations.

== Taxonomy ==
The species was originally described by Purcell in 1904 from Pirie Bush, King Williamstown. The genus Menneus was revised by Coddington et al. in 2012, who removed this species from synonymy with M. camelus.
