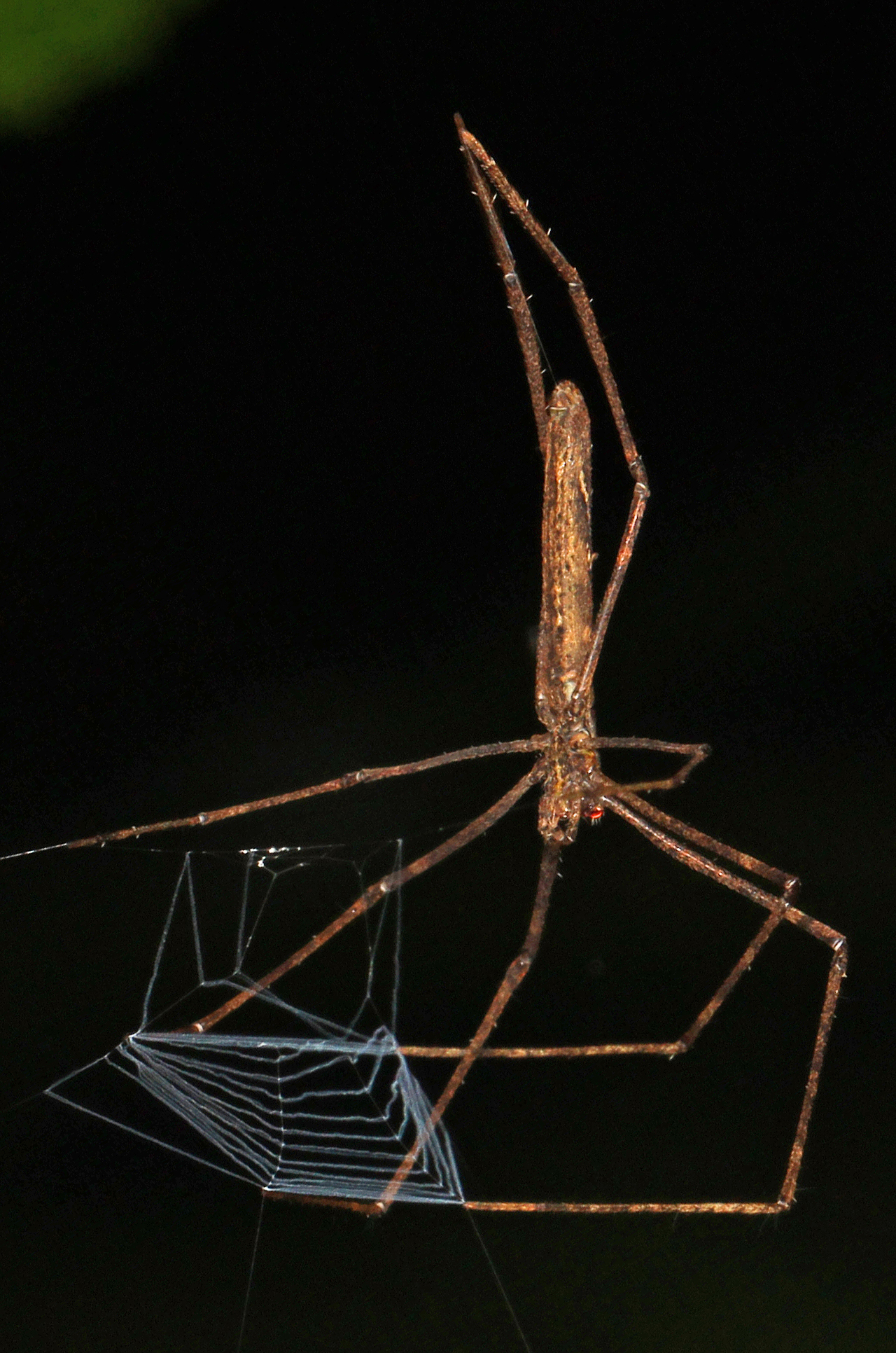

Scientific classification
- Kingdom: Animalia
- Phylum: Arthropoda
- Subphylum: Chelicerata
- Class: Arachnida
- Order: Araneae
- Infraorder: Araneomorphae
- Family: Deinopidae
- Genus: Deinopis
- Species: D. longipes

Binomial name
- Deinopis longipes F.O. P.-Cambridge, 1902

= Deinopis longipes =

Species of spider

Deinopis longipes is a species of net-casting spider (family Deinopidae). It is found throughout Central America.

This spider has a very slim, elongated body around 16 mm in length. As with other members of the family, it hunts at night, constructing a silken net which it uses to snare passing prey.
