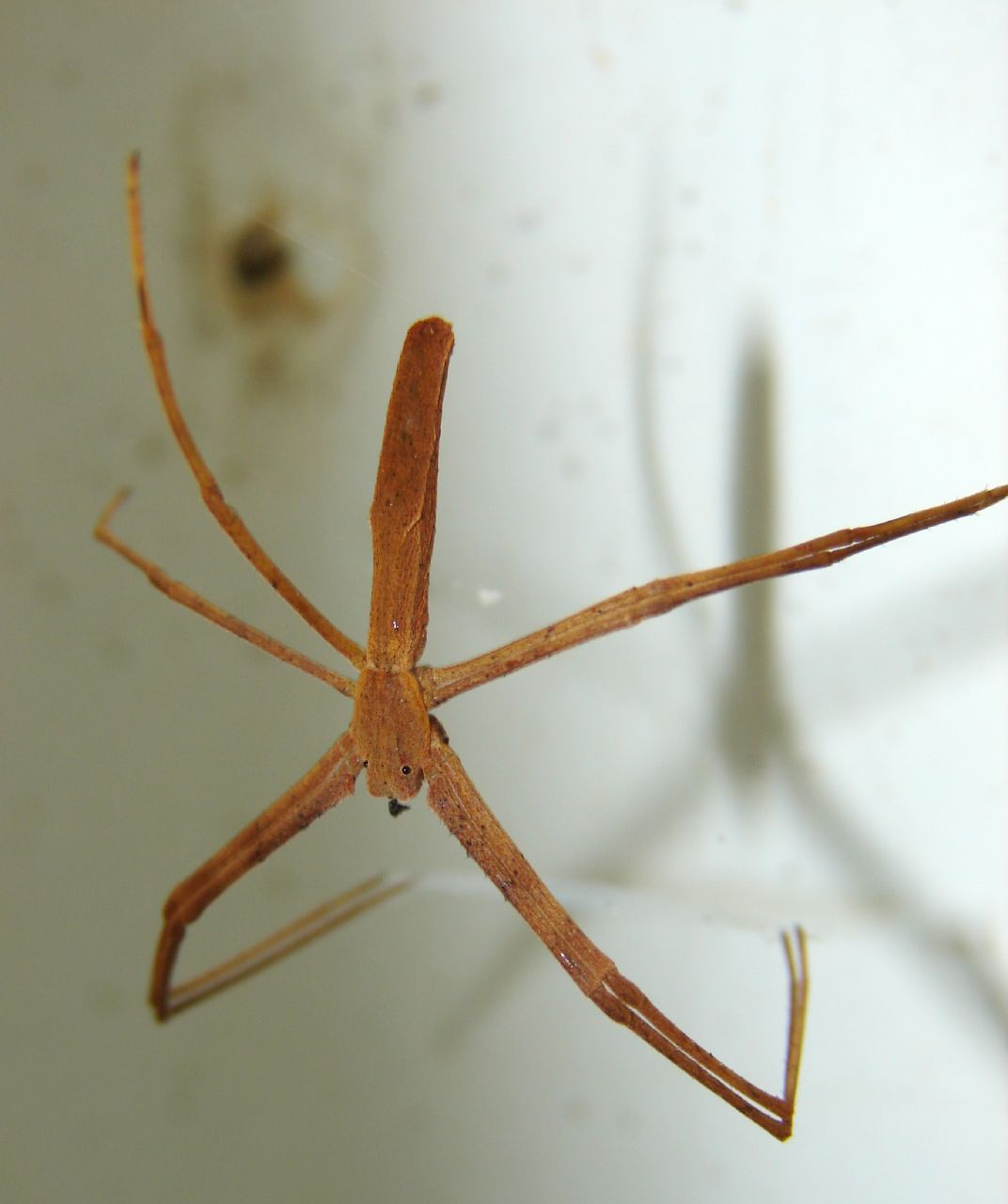
- Females are light reddish brown

Scientific classification
- Kingdom: Animalia
- Phylum: Arthropoda
- Subphylum: Chelicerata
- Class: Arachnida
- Order: Araneae
- Infraorder: Araneomorphae
- Family: Deinopidae
- Genus: Asianopis
- Species: A. subrufa

Binomial name
- Asianopis subrufa (L. Koch, 1878)
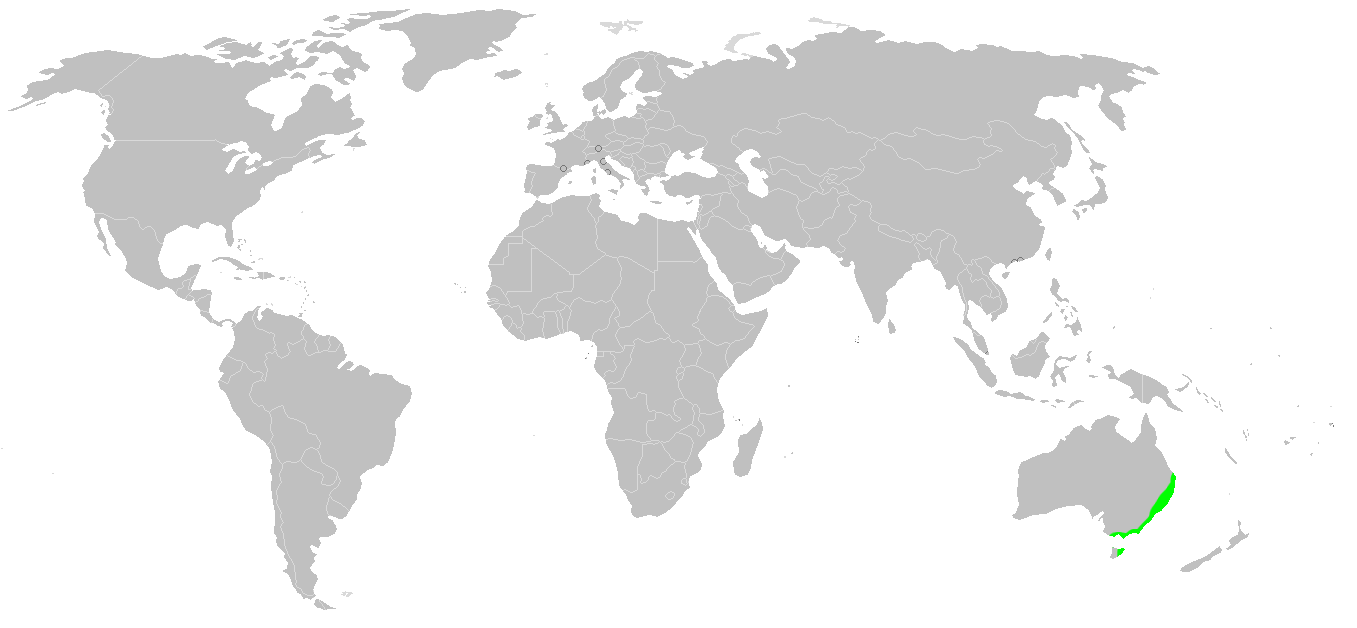
- Excludes New Zealand

Synonyms
- Deinopis subrufa L. Koch, 1878; Deinopis bicornis L. Koch, 1879

= Asianopis subrufa =

Species of spider

Asianopis subrufa (also called the rufous net-casting spider) is a species of net-casting spiders. It occurs in Australia (Queensland, New South Wales, Victoria and Tasmania) and in New Zealand. It is a nocturnal hunter, having excellent eyesight, and hunts using a silken net to capture its prey. They feed on a variety of insects, such as ants, beetles and crickets, and will also prey on other spiders. They can vary in colour from fawn to pinkish brown or chocolate brown. Females are about 25 mm in body length, males about 22 mm. They are not dangerous to humans.

This species is often found on a few strands of web in forest, woodland and heathland, or on flat surfaces in more urban environments, for example on the outside of houses.

== Taxonomy ==
Asianopis subrufa was first described by Ludwig Koch in 1878, in the genus Deinopis. In 2020, the species was transferred to the newly erected genus Asianopis which contains the Asian and West Pacific species formerly included in the genus Deinopis. The specific epithet subrufa is Latin for "reddish".

== Mating ==
Males will usually shed their last skin and then seek a suitable female to mate with. They will rest on the outer skirts of the female's web, and will gently pluck the web to show her that they are interested. Days after mating, the female then constructs a globular egg sac, approximately 10–12 mm in diameter. It is generally a light brown or fawn colour with black specks on it and contains anywhere from 100 to 200 eggs. It is usually disguised and protected by a leaf. Once the female has constructed the egg sac and laid the eggs, she will usually leave it to its own fate. After around 3 weeks, the young hatch.

== Gallery ==
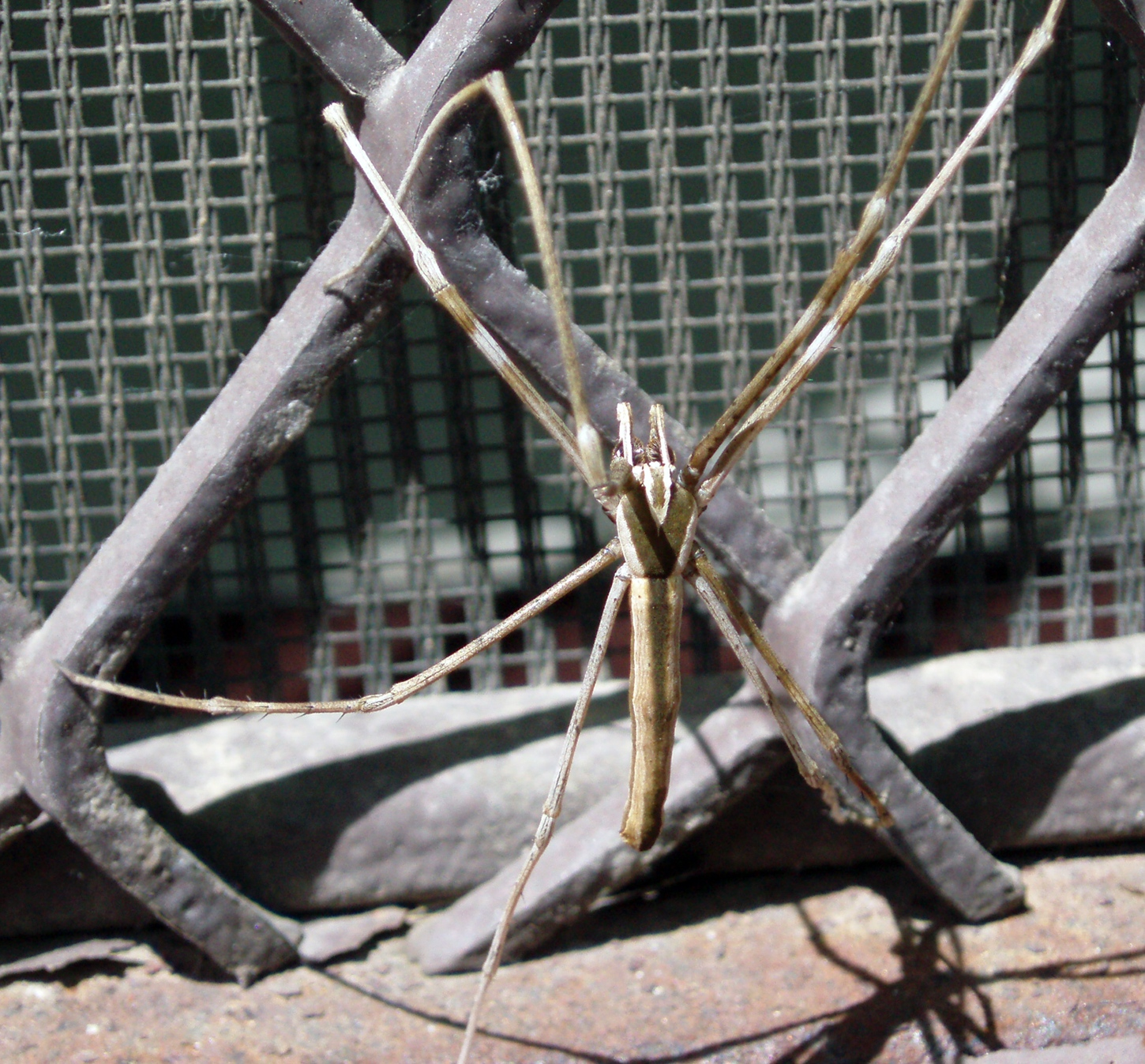
Males are striped.
