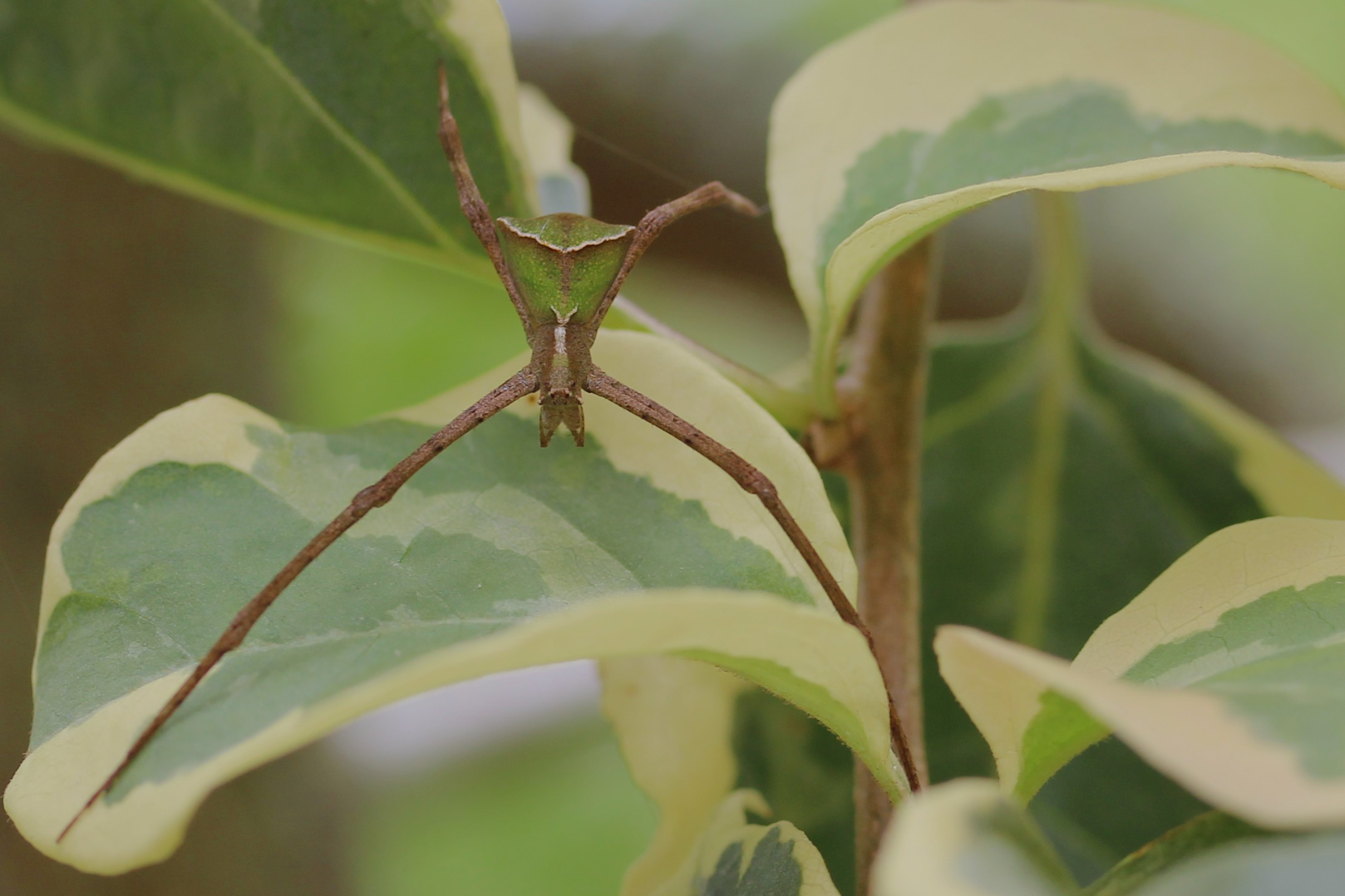

Scientific classification
- Domain: Eukaryota
- Kingdom: Animalia
- Phylum: Arthropoda
- Subphylum: Chelicerata
- Class: Arachnida
- Order: Araneae
- Infraorder: Araneomorphae
- Family: Deinopidae
- Genus: Menneus
- Species: M. nemesio

Binomial name
- Menneus nemesio Coddington, Kuntner & Opell, 2012

Synonyms
- Avella despiciens OP Cambridge 1877

= Menneus nemesio =

Species of spider

Menneus nemesio is an Australian species of net-casting spider in the family Deinopidae. This diurnal species is often found in vegetation near water, low to the ground. Usually a brown spider, though it is occasionally seen with a green abdomen.
