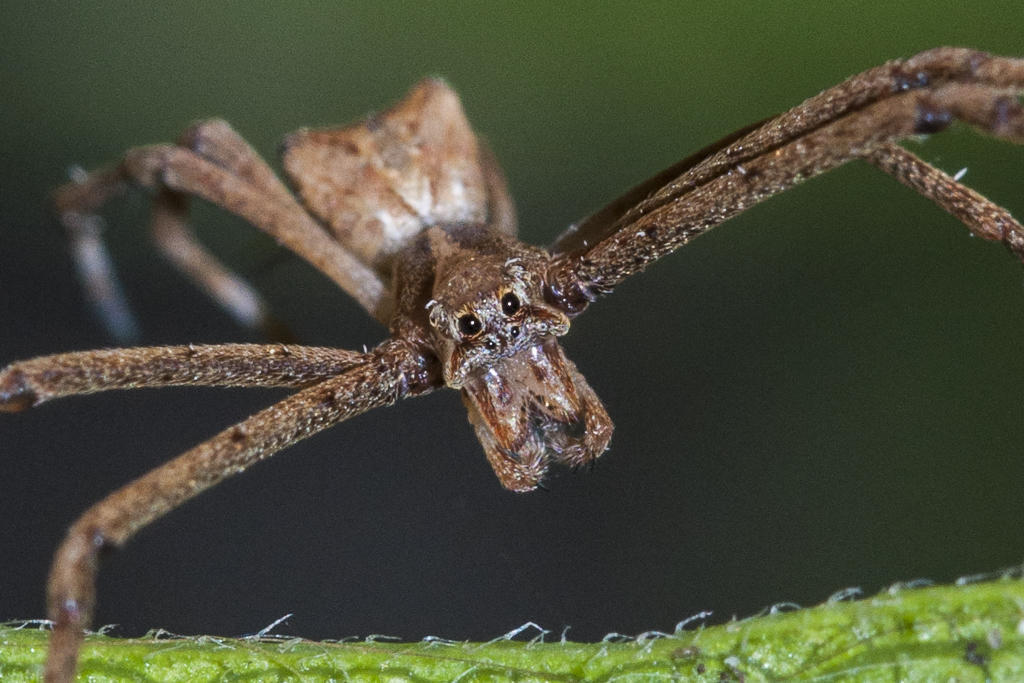
- M. capensis from Durban
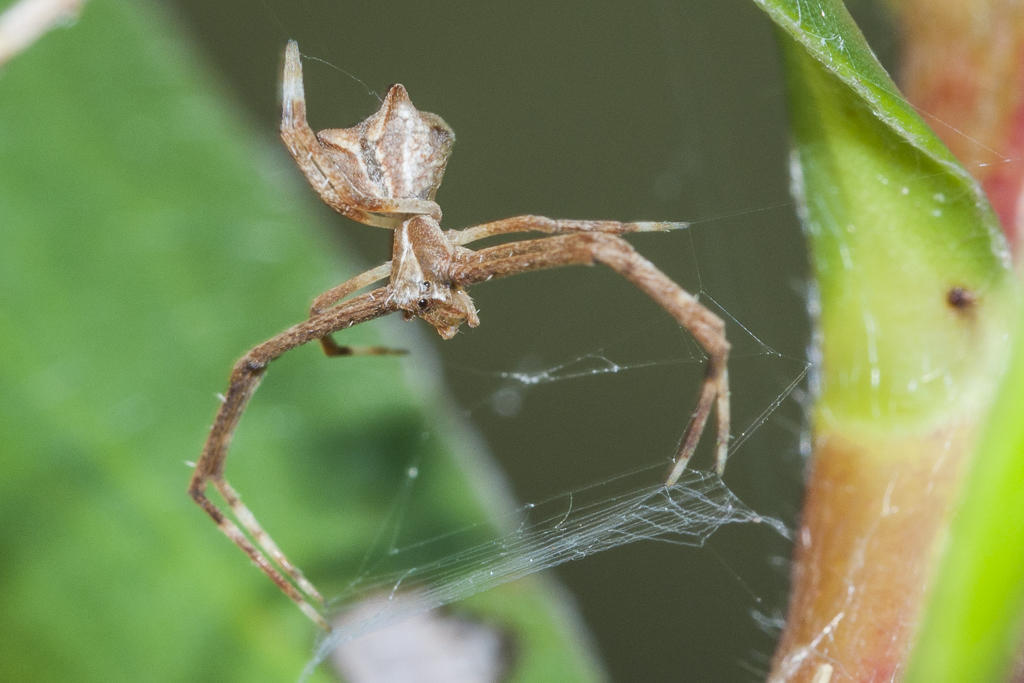

Conservation status
- Least Concern (SANBI Red List)

Scientific classification
- Kingdom: Animalia
- Phylum: Arthropoda
- Subphylum: Chelicerata
- Class: Arachnida
- Order: Araneae
- Infraorder: Araneomorphae
- Family: Deinopidae
- Genus: Menneus
- Species: M. capensis

Binomial name
- Menneus capensis (Purcell, 1904)

Synonyms
- Avellopsis capensis Purcell, 1904

= Menneus capensis =

Cape Net Casting Spider

Species of spider endemic to the Western Cape, South Africa

Menneus capensis, also known as Cape camel-back spider, is a species of net-casting spider in the family Deinopidae. It is endemic to the Western Cape in South Africa.

== Distribution ==
Menneus capensis was originally described from St James in the Western Cape. It is a Western Cape endemic known from more than ten locations, including three protected areas, at altitudes ranging from 7 to 313 metres above sea level.

== Habitat and ecology ==
The species builds small, rectangular expandable webs close to the ground using cribellate silk and holds them with its front legs. They are typically found under boulders adjacent to water. The spider is cryptic by day, resting with its body pressed against vegetation. It has been sampled from the Fynbos biome as well as Eucalyptus plantations.

== Description ==
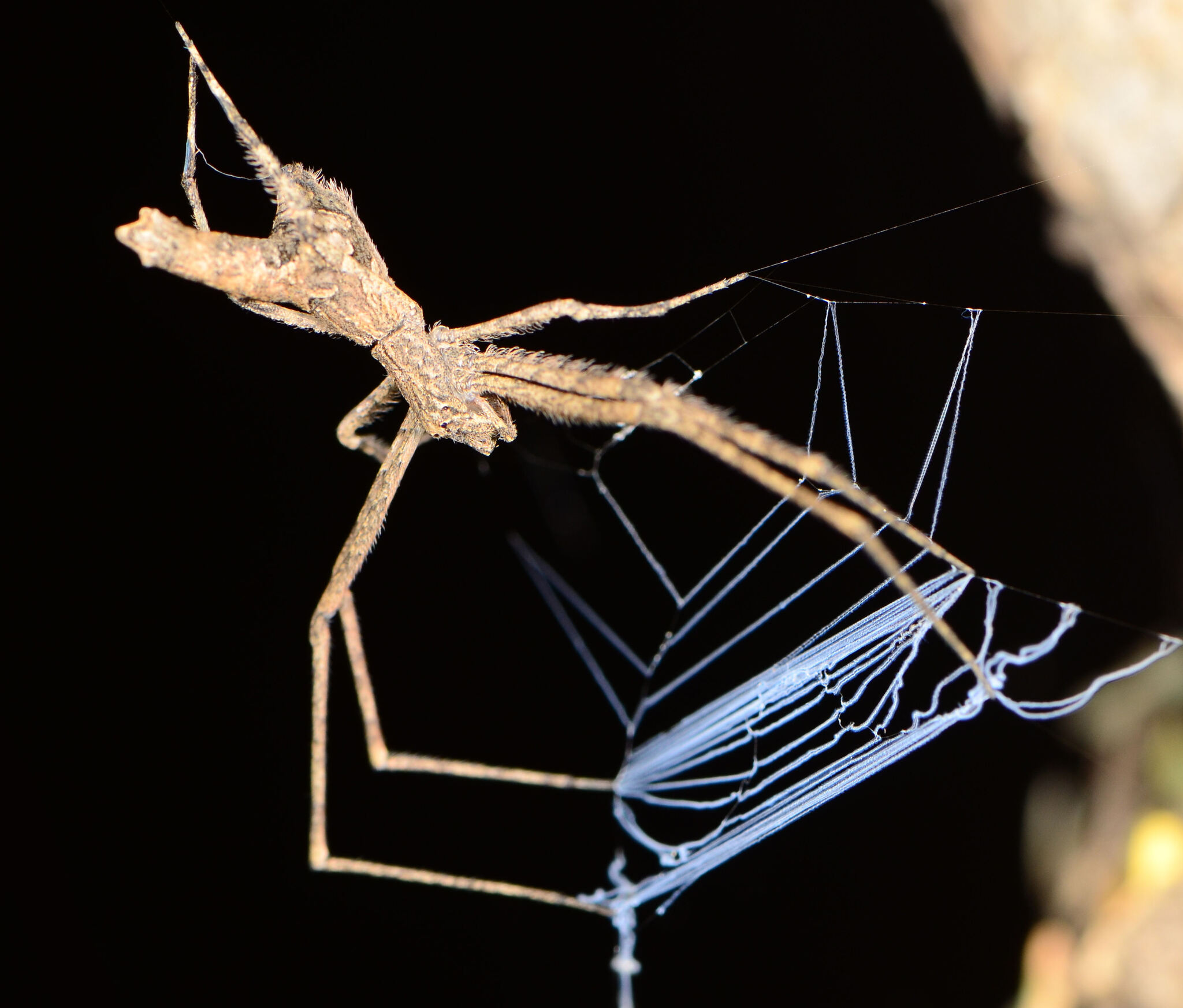
Female with web

== Conservation ==
Menneus capensis is listed as Least Concern by the South African National Biodiversity Institute. Although there is ongoing habitat loss to crop cultivation in some areas, the species is found in several protected areas in the Cape Peninsula. It is protected in De Hoop Nature Reserve, Table Mountain National Park, and Kirstenbosch National Botanical Garden.

== Taxonomy ==
The species was originally described by Purcell in 1904 as Avellopsis capensis from St James. The genus Menneus was revised by Coddington et al. in 2012.
