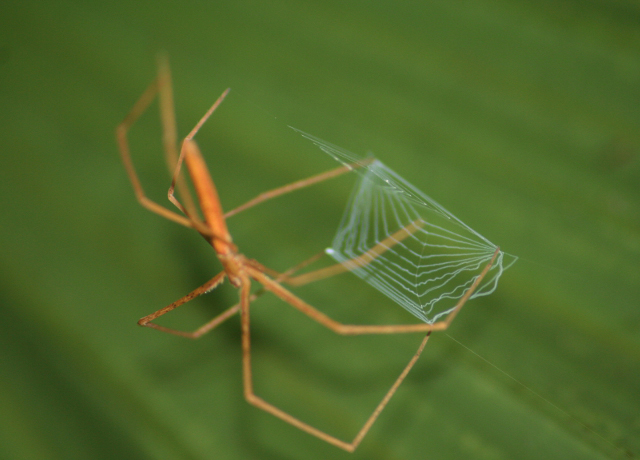
- D. spinosa foraging at night

Scientific classification
- Kingdom: Animalia
- Phylum: Arthropoda
- Subphylum: Chelicerata
- Class: Arachnida
- Order: Araneae
- Infraorder: Araneomorphae
- Family: Deinopidae
- Genus: Deinopis
- Species: D. spinosa

Binomial name
- Deinopis spinosa Marx, 1889

= Deinopis spinosa =

Species of spider

Deinopis spinosa, known generally as the ogrefaced spider or net-casting spider, is a species of ogrefaced spider in the family Deinopidae. It is found in the United States, St. Vincent, and Venezuela. This spider is notable for its use of a net to catch prey. It does this by holding a small web stretched across its legs while it is suspended from a sparse web frame. When prey approaches the spider, it lunges forward and captures the insect in its net. In order to capture prey flying above it the spider uses a backward striking motion. When prey is outside its field of vision this spider appears to use a sensory organ located on its front legs to sense to prey. This sensory organ is known as the metatarsal organ. During the day, the spider is immobile and camouflages itself on its host palm plant. At night, the spider hunts.
