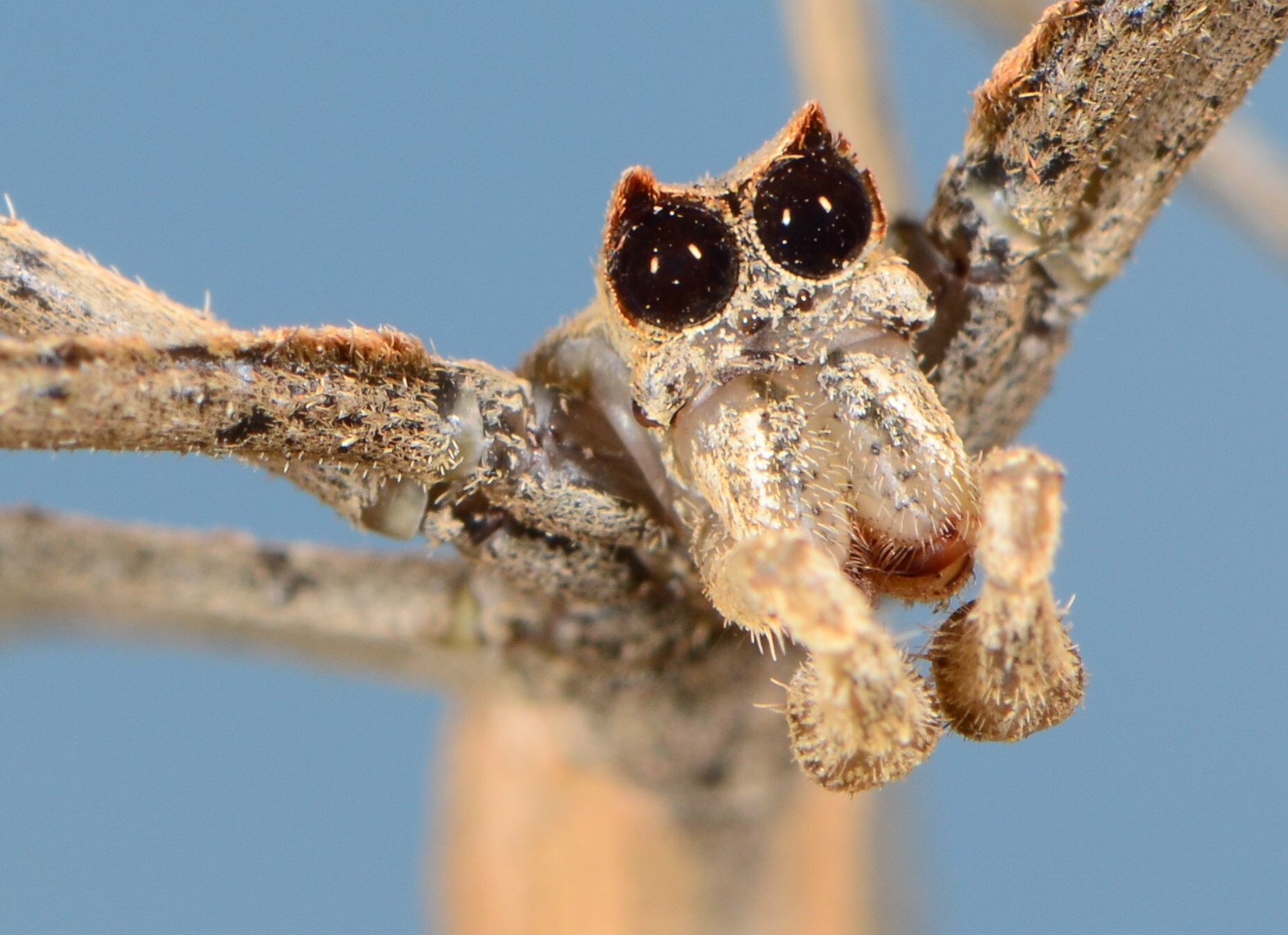
- Male 'A. cornigera'
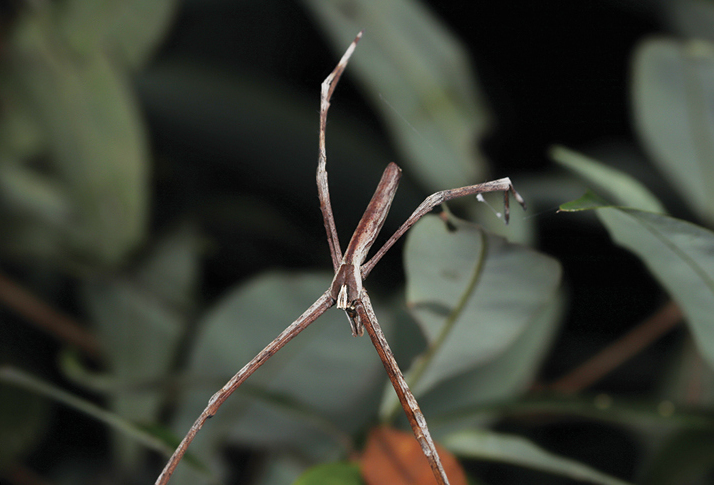
- A. zhuanghaoyuni

Scientific classification
- Kingdom: Animalia
- Phylum: Arthropoda
- Subphylum: Chelicerata
- Class: Arachnida
- Order: Araneae
- Infraorder: Araneomorphae
- Family: Deinopidae
- Genus: Asianopis; Lin & Li, 2020

Type species
- A. zhuanghaoyuni Lin & Li, 2020

Species
- 33, see text

= Asianopis =

Genus of spiders

Asianopis is a genus of Asian net-casting spiders first described by Y. J. Lin, L. Shao and A. Hänggi in 2020.

== Species ==
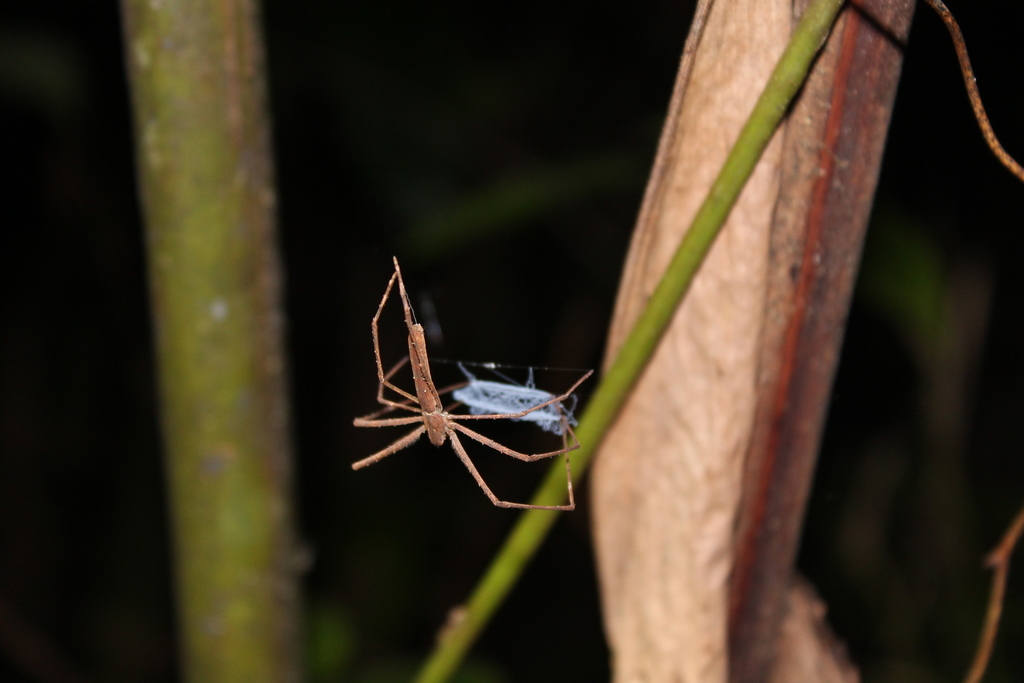
A. madagascariensis

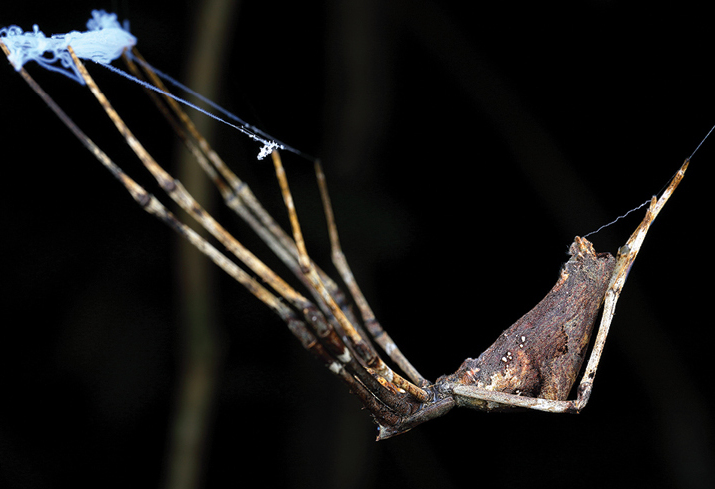
A. wangi

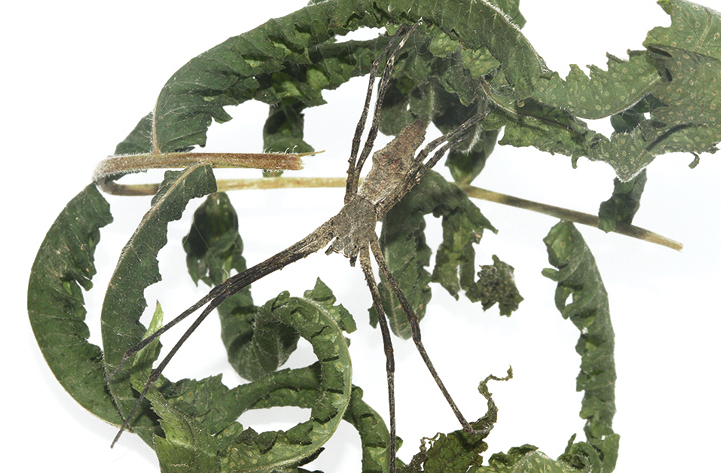
A. wuchaoi

As of September 2025, this genus includes 37 species:

- Asianopis anchietae (Brito Capello, 1867) – Angola, South Africa
- Asianopis apo Omelko & Fomichev, 2025 – Philippines (Mindanao)
- Asianopis aruensis (Roewer, 1938) – Indonesia (Aru Is.)
- Asianopis aspectans (Pocock, 1900) – Cameroon, Equatorial Guinea, DR Congo, South Africa
- Asianopis aurita (F. O. Pickard-Cambridge, 1902) – Mexico
- Asianopis camela (Thorell, 1881) – New Guinea (Indonesia, Papua New Guinea)
- Asianopis celebensis (Merian, 1911) – Indonesia (Sulawesi)
- Asianopis cornigera (Gerstaecker, 1873) – Ethiopia, Rwanda, Burundi, Tanzania, South Africa
- Asianopis cylindrica (Pocock, 1898) – Mozambique, South Africa
- Asianopis dumogae (Merian, 1911) – Indonesia (Sulawesi)
- Asianopis fasciata (L. Koch, 1879) – Australia (Queensland)
- Asianopis fasciculiger (Simon, 1909) – Vietnam
- Asianopis giltayi (Lessert, 1930) – DR Congo
- Asianopis goalparaensis (Tikader & Malhotra, 1978) – India, Nepal
- Asianopis gorochovi Fomichev & Omelko, 2023 – Indonesia (Sumatra)
- Asianopis guineensis (Berland & Millot, 1940) – Guinea, Sierra Leone
- Asianopis kollari (Doleschall, 1859) – Myanmar, Indonesia (Ambon)
- Asianopis konplong (Logunov, 2018) – Vietnam
- Asianopis labangan (Barrion-Dupo & Barrion, 2018) – Philippines
- Asianopis lini Omelko & Fomichev, 2025 – Malaysia (Borneo)
- Asianopis liukuensis (Yin, Griswold & Yan, 2002) – India, China, Malaysia (Borneo)
- Asianopis longipalpula (Strand, 1913) – DR Congo
- Asianopis luzonensis (Barrion-Dupo & Barrion, 2018) – Philippines
- Asianopis madagascariensis (Lenz, 1886) – Madagascar
- Asianopis mediocris (Kulczyński, 1908) – Papua New Guinea
- Asianopis naumenkoi Omelko & Fomichev, 2025 – Philippines (Luzon)
- Asianopis ornata (Pocock, 1902) – Ethiopia
- Asianopis ravida (L. Koch, 1878) – Australia (Queensland)
- Asianopis reticulata (Rainbow, 1899) – Papua New Guinea
- Asianopis schomburgki (Karsch, 1878) – Australia (South Australia)
- Asianopis schoutedeni (Giltay, 1929) – DR Congo
- Asianopis subrufa (L. Koch, 1878) – Australia (Queensland, New South Wales, Tasmania), New Zealand
- Asianopis tabida (L. Koch, 1879) – Australia (Queensland)
- Asianopis unicolor (L. Koch, 1878) – Australia (Western Australia)
- Asianopis wangi Lin & Li, 2020 – China (Hainan)
- Asianopis wuchaoi Lin & Li, 2020 – China
- Asianopis zhuanghaoyuni Lin & Li, 2020 – China (type species)

== See also ==
- Deinopis
