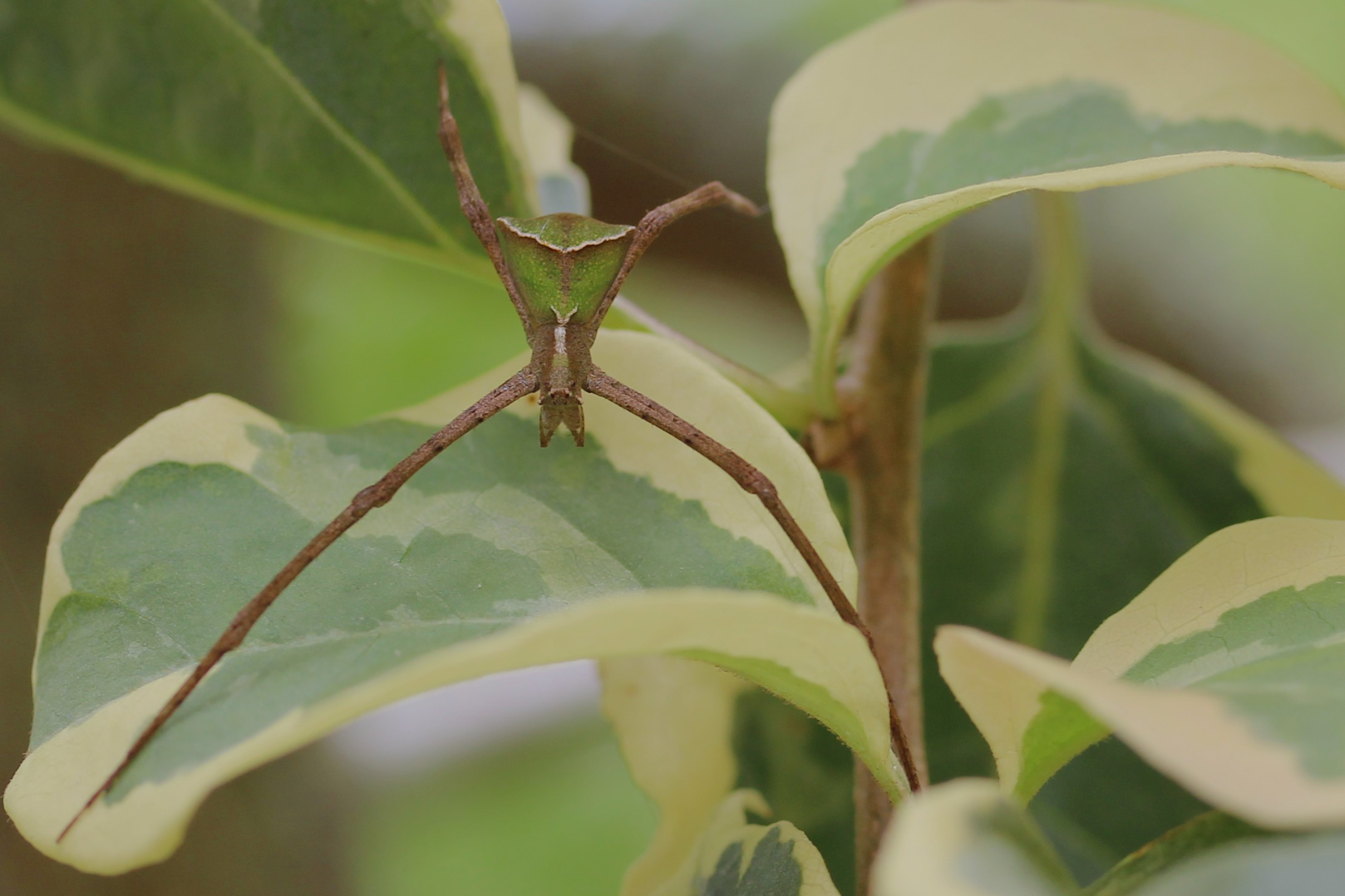
- M. nemesio

Scientific classification
- Kingdom: Animalia
- Phylum: Arthropoda
- Subphylum: Chelicerata
- Class: Arachnida
- Order: Araneae
- Infraorder: Araneomorphae
- Family: Deinopidae
- Genus: Menneus; Simon, 1876

Type species
- M. tetragnathoides Simon, 1876

Species
- 14, see text

Synonyms
- Avella O. Pickard-Cambridge, 1877; Avellopsis Purcell, 1904

= Menneus =

Menneus Temporal range: Palaeogene–present

Genus of spiders

Menneus is a genus of net-casting spiders that was first described by Eugène Simon in 1876. It includes the former genera Avella and Avellopsis. Species are found in Australia, New Caledonia, and eastern and southern Africa. Originally placed with the cribellate orb-weavers, it was moved to the Deinopidae in 1967.

== Species ==
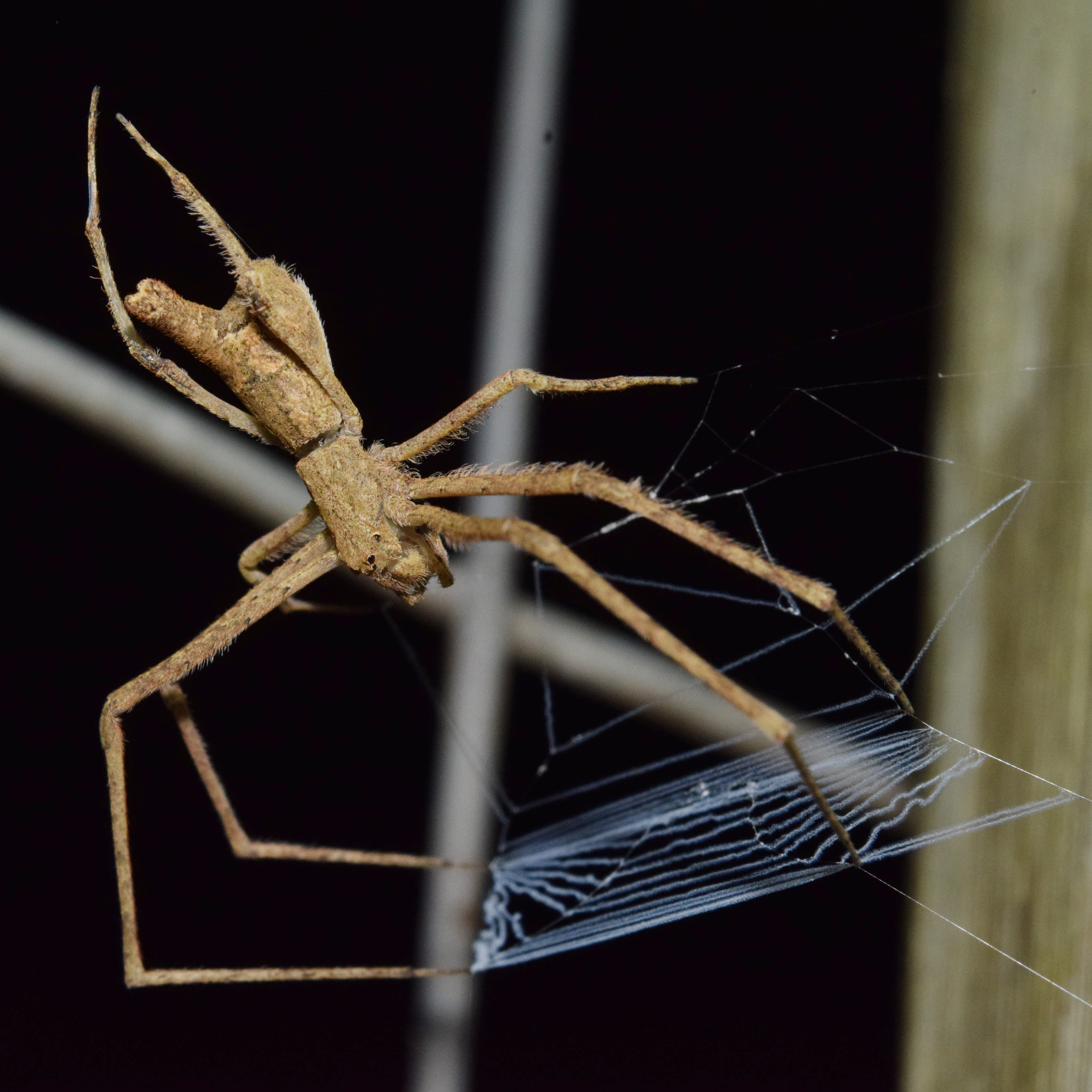
M. camelus

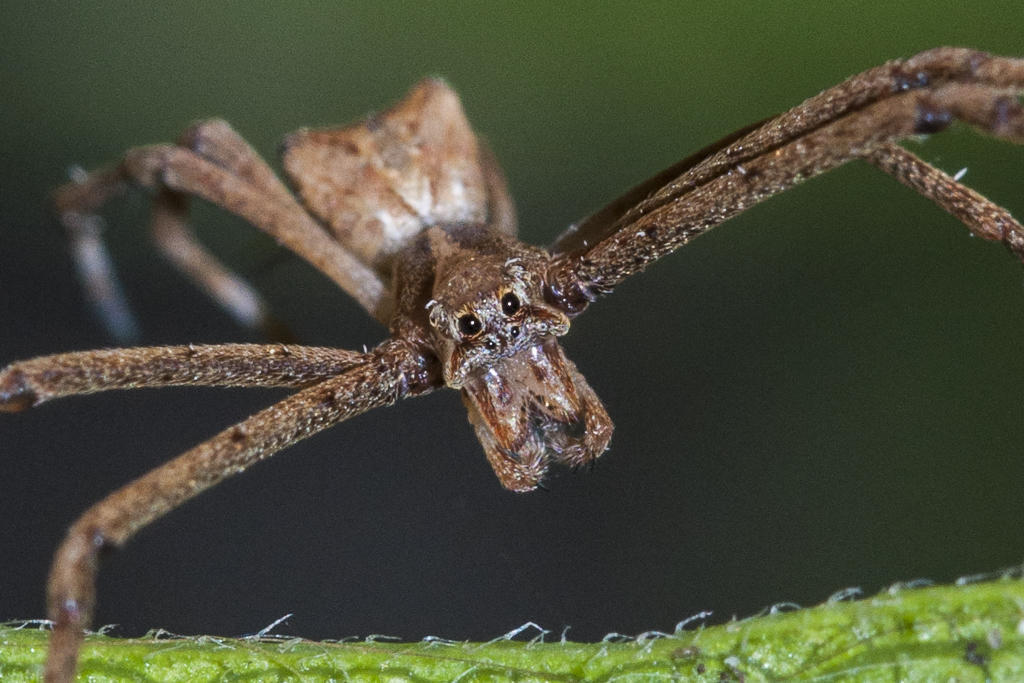
M. capensis

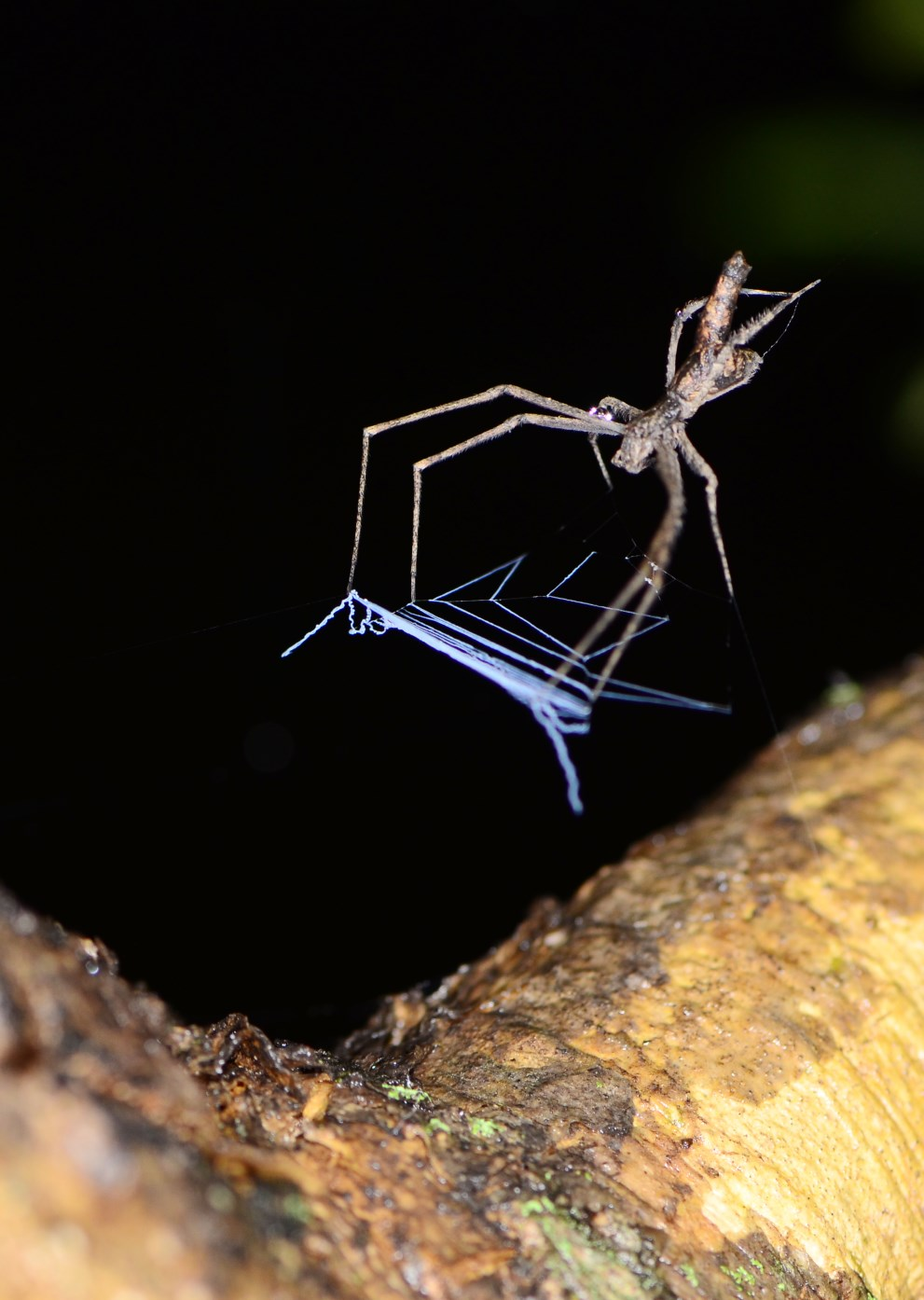
M. dromedarius

== Species ==
As of September 2025, this genus includes 14 species:

- Menneus aussie Coddington, Kuntner & Opell, 2012 – Australia (Queensland, New South Wales), New Caledonia
- Menneus bituberculatus Coddington, Kuntner & Opell, 2012 – Australia (Queensland), possibly New Guinea
- Menneus camelus Pocock, 1902 – South Africa
- Menneus capensis (Purcell, 1904) – South Africa
- Menneus darwini Coddington, Kuntner & Opell, 2012 – Tanzania
- Menneus dromedarius Purcell, 1904 – South Africa, Madagascar
- Menneus nemesio Coddington, Kuntner & Opell, 2012 – Australia (New South Wales)
- Menneus neocaledonicus (Simon, 1888) – New Caledonia
- Menneus quasimodo Coddington, Kuntner & Opell, 2012 – Australia (Western Australia)
- Menneus samperi Coddington, Kuntner & Opell, 2012 – East Africa
- Menneus superciliosus (Thorell, 1881) – Australia (Queensland, New South Wales)
- Menneus tetragnathoides Simon, 1877 – Angola, Malawi, Tanzania (type species)
- Menneus trinodosus Rainbow, 1920 – Australia (Queensland, New South Wales, Lord Howe Island)
- Menneus wa Coddington, Kuntner & Opell, 2012 – Australia (Western Australia)
