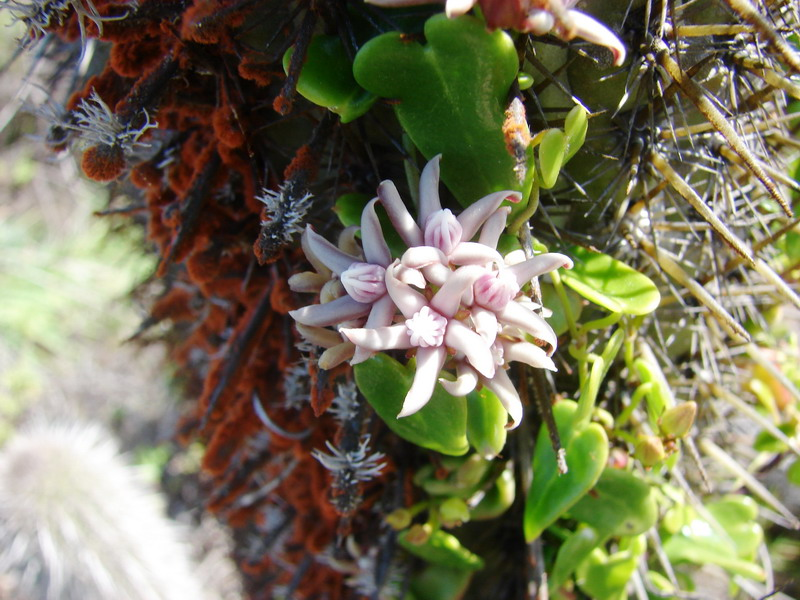
- Diplolepis boerhaviifolia

Scientific classification
- Kingdom: Plantae
- Clade: Embryophytes
- Clade: Tracheophytes
- Clade: Spermatophytes
- Clade: Angiosperms
- Clade: Eudicots
- Clade: Asterids
- Order: Gentianales
- Family: Apocynaceae
- Subfamily: Asclepiadoideae
- Tribe: Asclepiadeae
- Genus: Diplolepis; R.Br.

= Diplolepis (plant) =

Genus of plants

Diplolepis is a plant genus in the family Apocynaceae, first described as a genus in 1810. It is native to southern South America (Argentina and Chile).

Species

1. Diplolepis boerhaviifolia - Chile
2. Diplolepis descolei - Argentina
3. Diplolepis geminiflora - Chile
4. Diplolepis hieronymi - Argentina
5. Diplolepis menziesii - Chile
6. Diplolepis nummulariifolia - Chile

formerly included

1. D. apiculata, syn of Tylophora hirsuta
2. D. longirostrum, syn of Cynanchum longirostrum
3. D. ovata, syn of Tylophora ovata
4. D. variabilis, syn of Cynanchum atacamense
5. D. vomitoria, syn of Tylophora asthmatica
