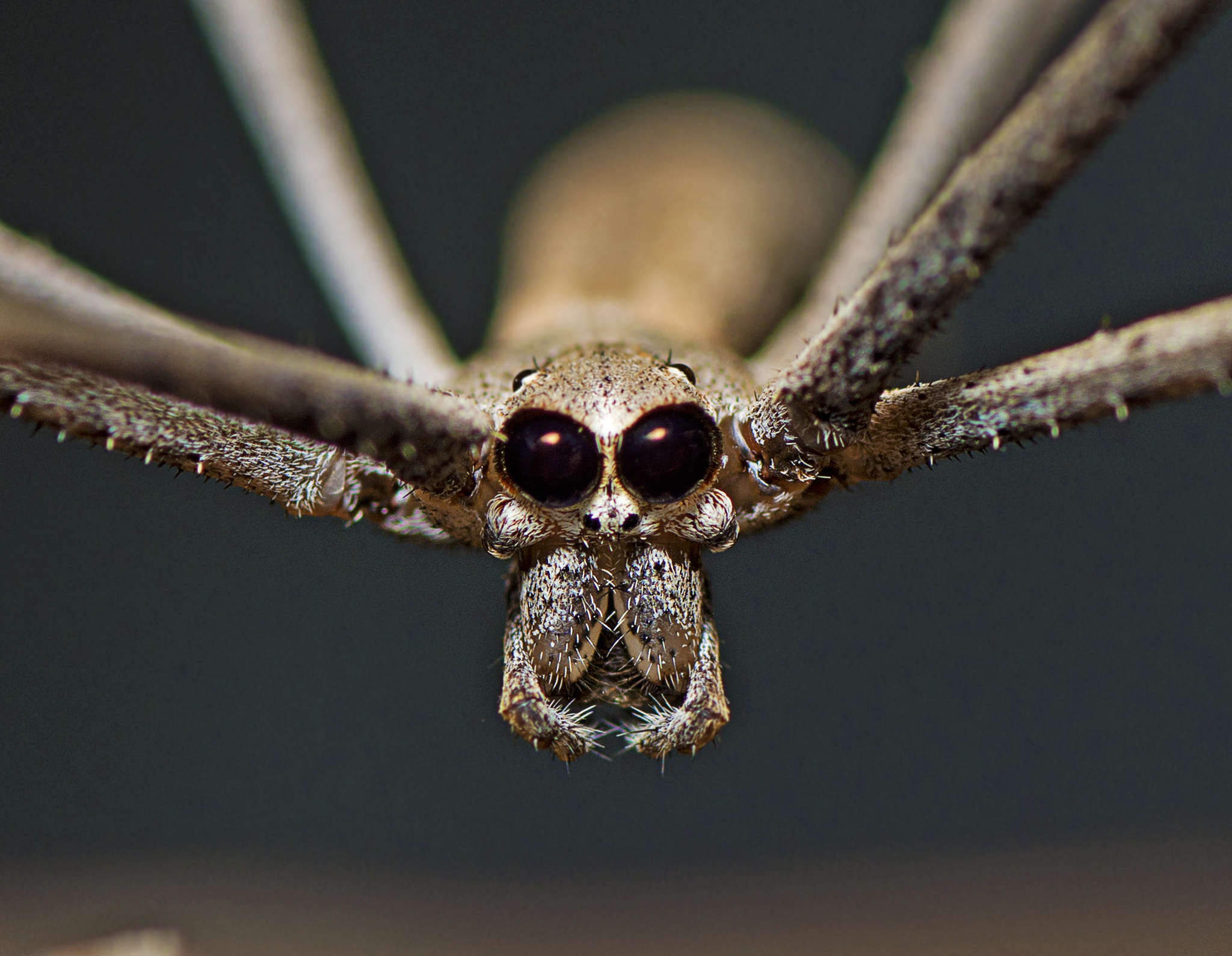
- Deinopis subrufa front view
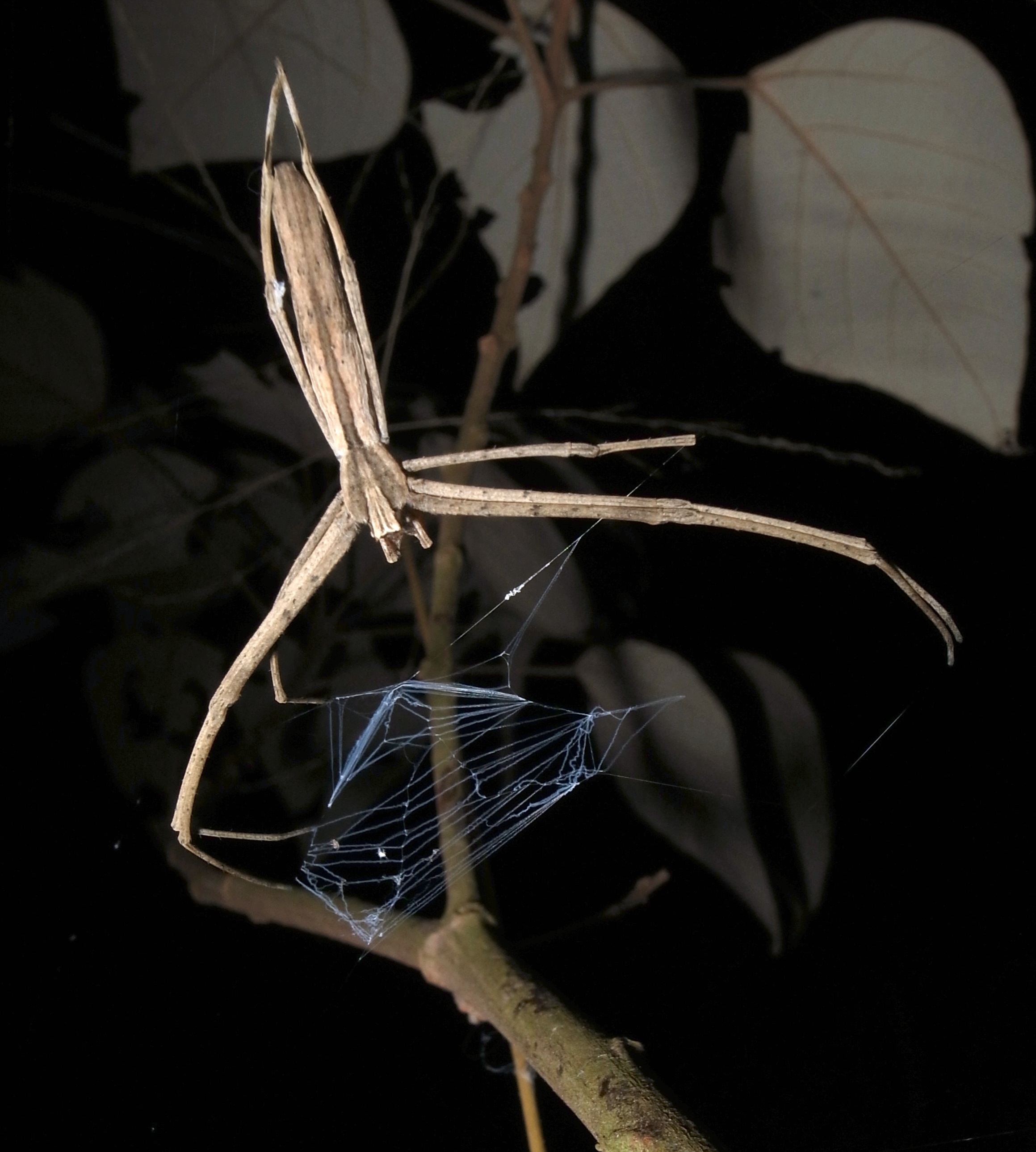
- Deinopis sp. with web

Scientific classification
- Kingdom: Animalia
- Phylum: Arthropoda
- Subphylum: Chelicerata
- Class: Arachnida
- Order: Araneae
- Infraorder: Araneomorphae
- Family: Deinopidae; C. L. Koch, 1850

Genera
- Asianopis Lin & Li, 2020; Deinopis MacLeay, 1839; Menneus Simon, 1876

Diversity
- 3 genera, 71 species
- blue: reported countries (WSC) green: observation hotspots (iNaturalist)

= Deinopidae =

Net-casting spiders Temporal range: Cretaceous–present

Family of spiders

Deinopidae, also known as net-casting spiders, are a family of circumtropical cribellate spiders first described by Carl Ludwig Koch in 1850. They are a group of stick-like elongated spiders that catch prey by stretching a web across their front legs before propelling themselves forward. These unusual webs will stretch two or three times their relaxed size, entangling any prey that touch them.

The posterior median eyes have excellent night vision, allowing them to cast nets accurately in low-light conditions. These eyes are larger than the others, and sometimes makes these spiders appear to only have two eyes. Ogre-faced spiders (Deinopis) are the best known genus in this family. The name refers to the perceived physical similarity to the mythological creature of the same name. This family also includes the humped-back spiders (Menneus).

== Distribution ==
They are distributed through tropics worldwide from Australia to Africa and the Americas.

In Florida, Deinopis often hangs upside down from a silk line under palmetto fronds during the day. At night, it emerges to practice its unusual prey capture method on invertebrate prey. Its eyes are able to gather available light more efficiently than the eyes of cats and owls, and are able to do this despite the lack of a reflective layer (tapetum lucidum); instead, each night, a large area of light-sensitive membrane is manufactured within the eyes, and since arachnid eyes do not have irises, it is rapidly destroyed again at dawn.

== Genera ==
As of January 2026, this family includes three genera and 71 species:

- Asianopis Lin & Li, 2020 – Africa, Asia, Oceania
- Deinopis Macleay, 1839 – Central and South America
- Menneus Simon, 1876 – Africa, Oceania

Two genera formerly included in this family, Avella O. P-Cambridge, 1877 and Avellopsis Purcell, 1904, are now placed in Menneus.

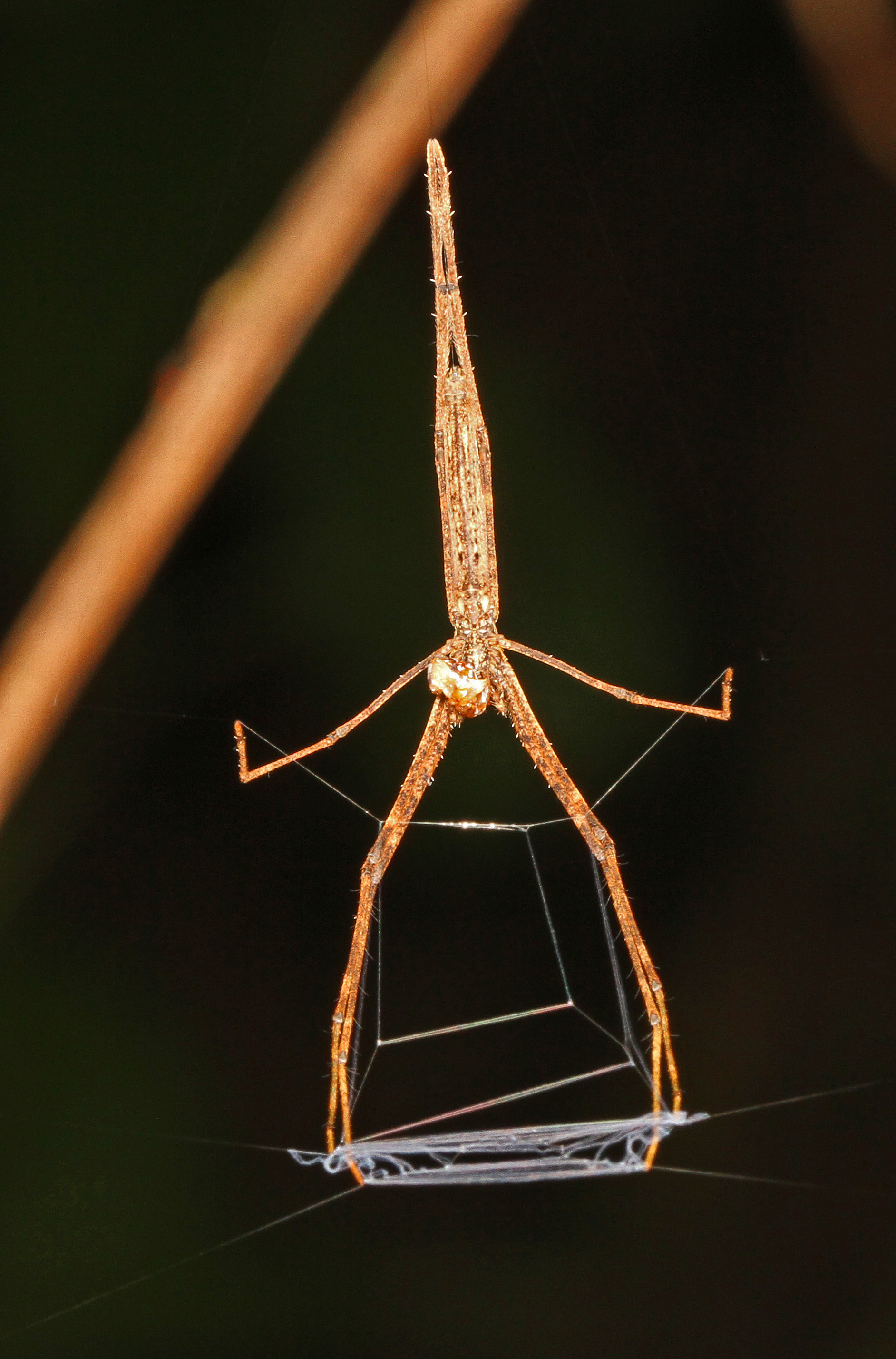
D. longipes casting a net

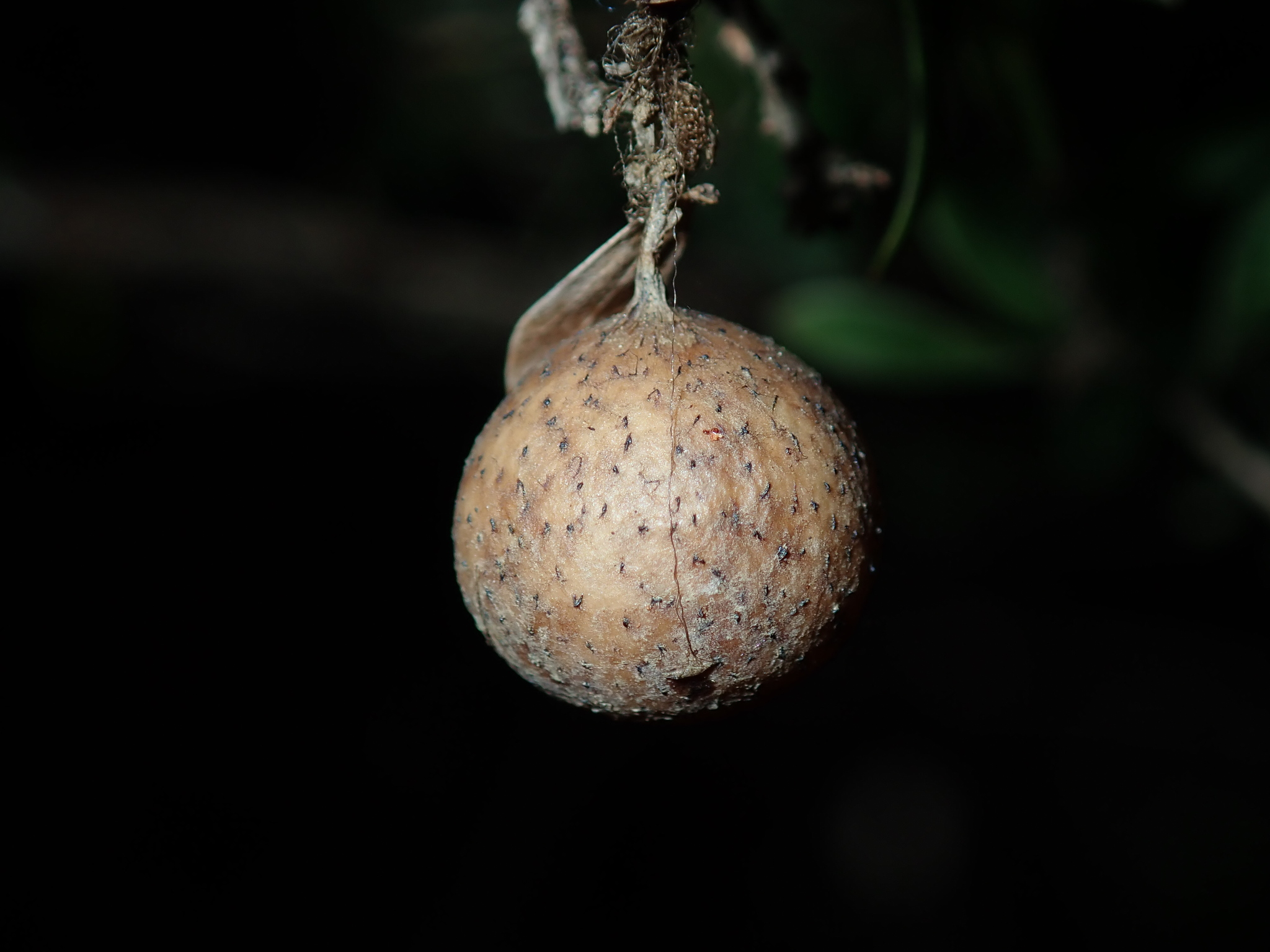
Egg sac

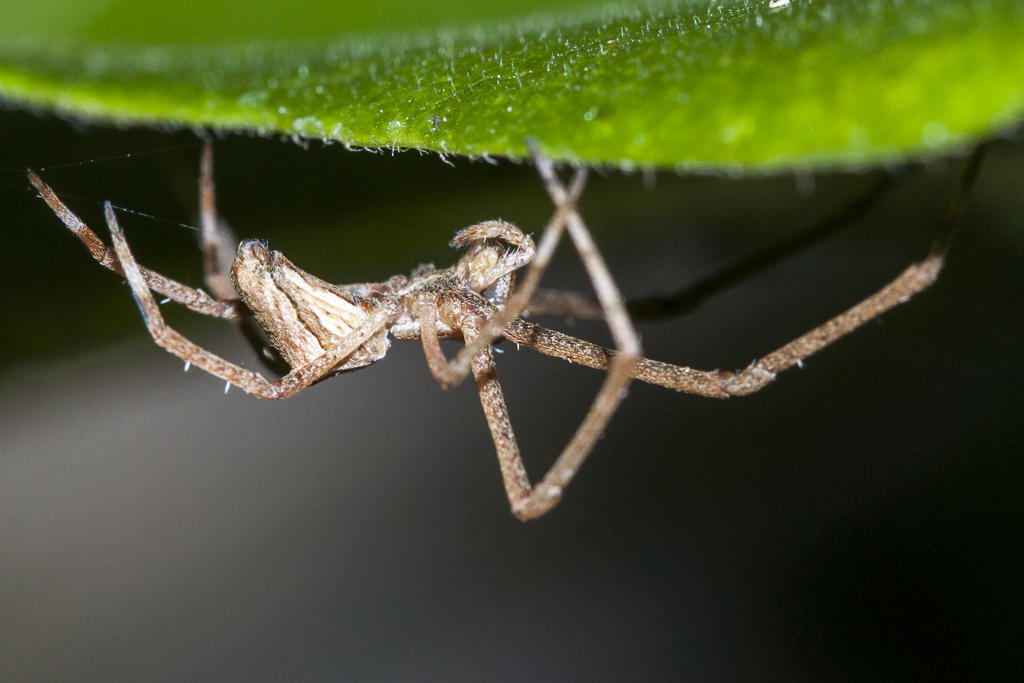
Menneus capensis
