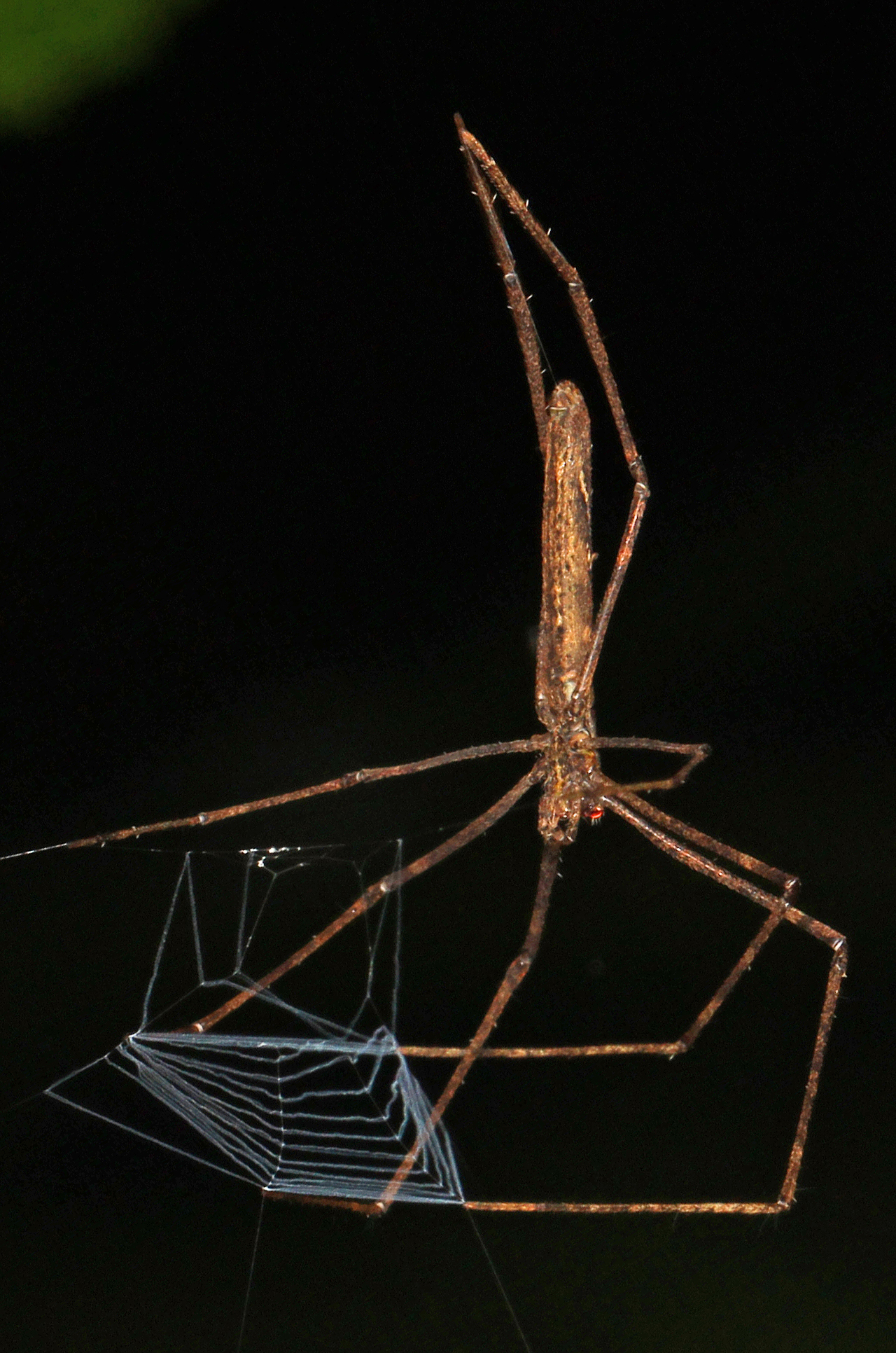
- Deinopis longipes

Scientific classification
- Kingdom: Animalia
- Phylum: Arthropoda
- Subphylum: Chelicerata
- Class: Arachnida
- Order: Araneae
- Infraorder: Araneomorphae
- Family: Deinopidae
- Genus: Deinopis; MacLeay, 1839

Type species
- D. lamia MacLeay, 1839

Species
- 20, see text

= Deinopis =

Ogre-faced spiders

Genus of spiders

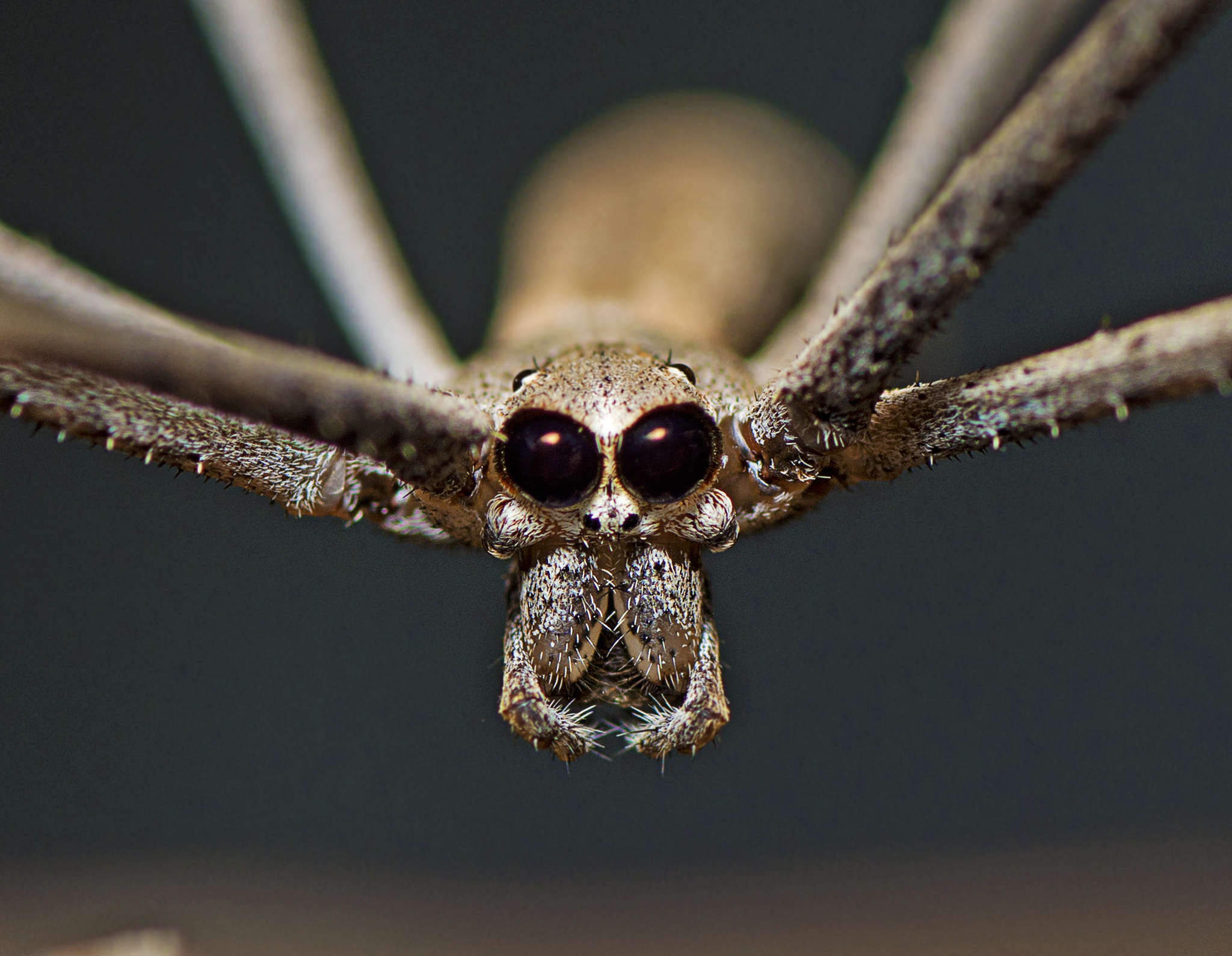
Deinopis subrufa

Deinopis, also known as net-casting spiders, gladiator spiders and ogre-faced spiders, is a genus of net-casting spiders that was first described by W. S. MacLeay in 1839. Its distribution is widely tropical and subtropical. They catch their prey using a specially spun "net".

== Etymology ==
The name is derived from the Greek δεινός (deinos), meaning "fearful", and opis, meaning "appearance", referring to their ogre-like faces. The spelling "Dinopis" is also found, but is regarded as an "unjustified emendation".

== Net-casting ==
Spiders in the genus Deinopis catch their prey in an unusual fashion. They first spin a small upright rectangular cribellate web. This is then detached from its supporting threads and held horizontally above the ground by the spider's long front two pairs of legs while the spider hangs almost vertically. Passing prey is then captured by dropping the "net" over it. To aid further in netting prey, the spider places white fecal spots on the surface below the net and uses them for aiming. Spiders also lack ears, but Deinopis species use hairs and receptors (slit sensillae) on their legs to distinguish sounds at a distance of up to 2 meters.

== Auditory senses ==
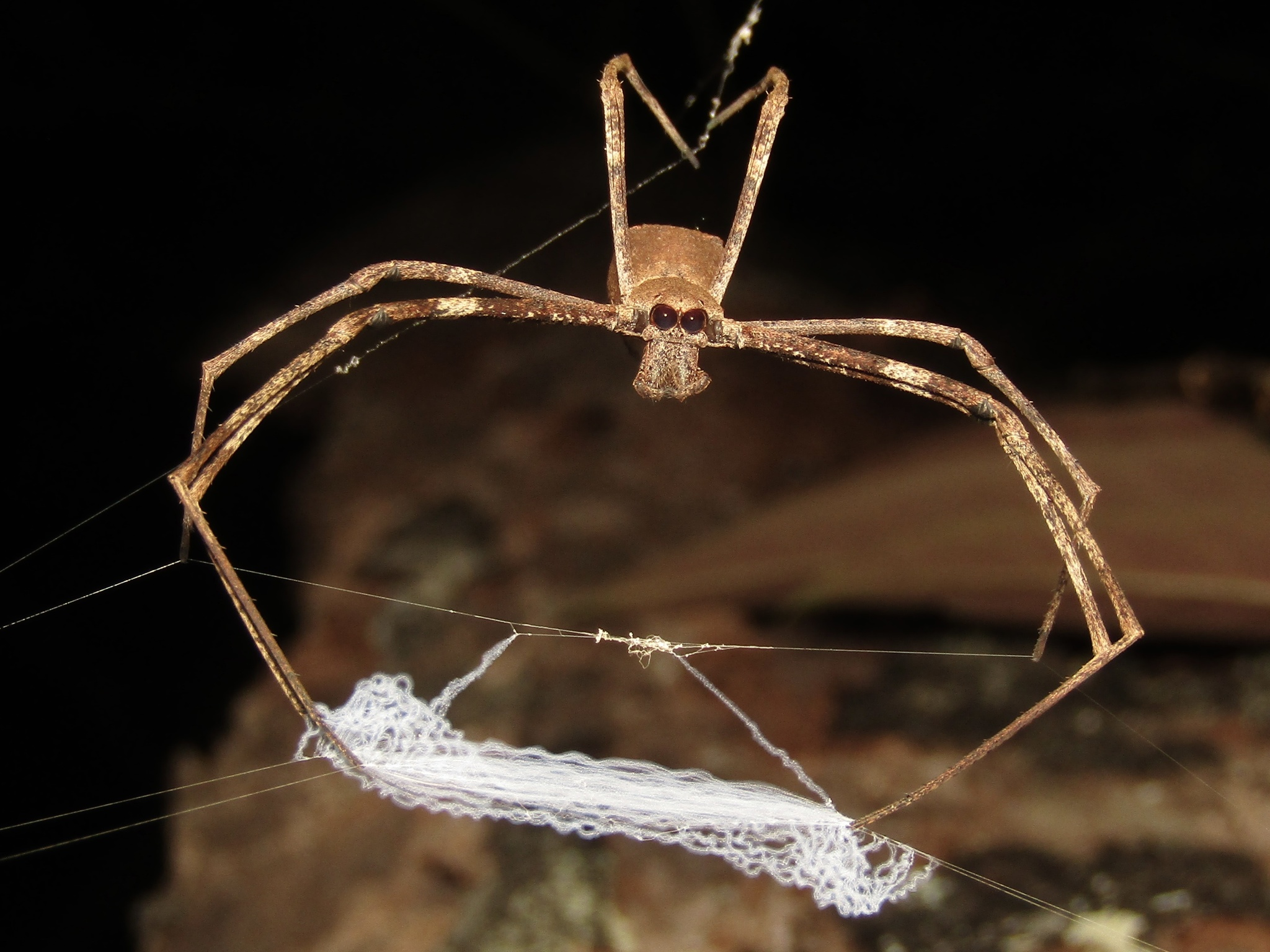
D. subrufa nest casting

Based on experiments investigating neural responses to sound, Deinopis spiders are able to detect acoustic signals over a broad range of frequencies, ranging from 100 – 10,000 Hz.

== Eyes ==
The two posterior median eyes are enlarged and forward-facing. These eyes have a wide field of view and are able to gather available light more efficiently than the eyes of cats and owls, and are 2000 times more sensitive to light than human photoreceptors. This is despite the fact that they lack a reflective layer (tapetum lucidum); instead, each night, a large area of light-sensitive membrane is manufactured within the eyes, and destroyed at dawn, with the membrane being converted into vesicles which are then lysed in the inter-rhabdomeral cytoplasm.

== Species ==
As of September 2025, this genus included twenty species:

- Deinopis amica Schiapelli & Gerschman, 1957 – Argentina, Uruguay
- Deinopis armaticeps Mello-Leitão, 1925 – Brazil
- Deinopis biaculeata Simon, 1906 – Brazil
- Deinopis bituberculata Franganillo, 1930 – Cuba
- Deinopis bucculenta Schenkel, 1953 – Venezuela
- Deinopis cylindracea C. L. Koch, 1846 – Colombia
- Deinopis diabolica Kraus, 1956 – El Salvador
- Deinopis fastigata Simon, 1906 – Brazil
- Deinopis granadensis Keyserling, 1879 – Colombia
- Deinopis guasca Mello-Leitão, 1943 – Brazil
- Deinopis guianensis Taczanowski, 1874 – French Guiana
- Deinopis lamia MacLeay, 1839 – Cuba, Turks & Caicos, Puerto Rico (type species)
- Deinopis longipes F.O. Pickard-Cambridge, 1902 – Mexico, Panama
- Deinopis pallida Mello-Leitão, 1939 – Brazil
- Deinopis pardalis Simon, 1906 – Brazil
- Deinopis plurituberculata Mello-Leitão, 1925 – Brazil
- Deinopis rodophthalma Mello-Leitão, 1939 – Brazil
- Deinopis seriata Simon, 1906 – Brazil
- Deinopis spinosa Marx, 1889 – United States, Jamaica, St. Vincent, Venezuela
- Deinopis tuboculata Franganillo, 1926 – Cuba
