= List of Liphistiidae species =

This page lists all described species of the spider family Liphistiidae accepted by the World Spider Catalog as of April 2024:

== Ganthela ==
Ganthela Xu & Kuntner, 2015

- G. cipingensis (Wang, 1989) — China
- G. jianensis Xu, Kuntner & Chen, 2015 — China
- G. qingyuanensis Xu, Kuntner & Liu, 2015 — China
- G. venus Xu, 2015 — China
- G. wangjiangensis Xu, Kuntner & Liu, 2015 — China
- G. xianyouensis Xu, Kuntner & Chen, 2015 — China
- G. yundingensis Xu, 2015 (type) — China

== Heptathela ==
Heptathela

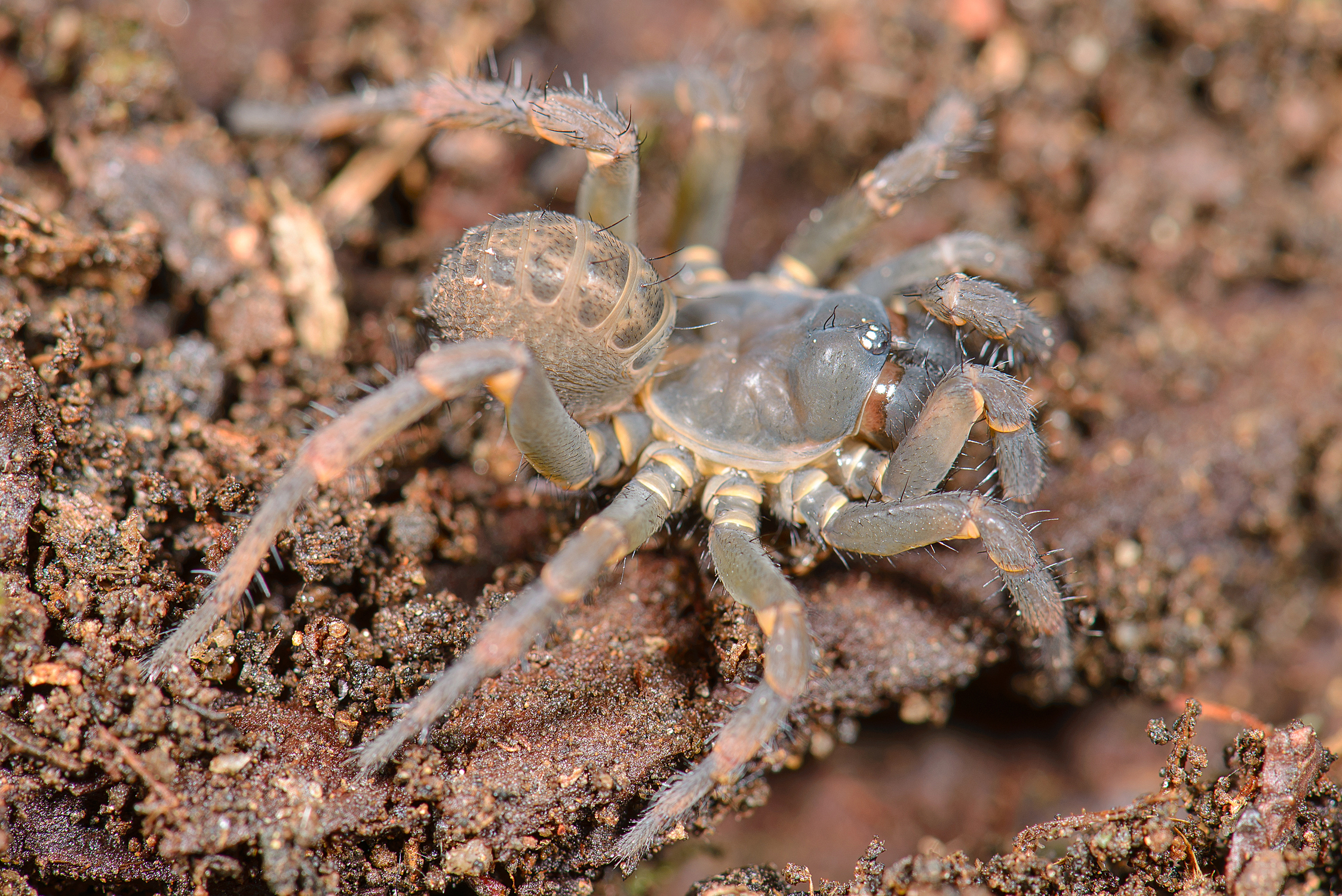
Heptathela higoensis

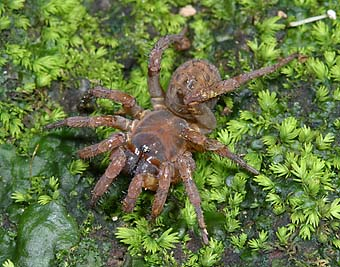
Heptathela yanbaruensis, female

Heptathela Kishida, 1923

- H. aha Xu, Ono, Kuntner, Liu & Li, 2019 — Japan (Ryukyu Is.)
- H. amamiensis Haupt, 1983 — Japan (Ryukyu Is.)
- H. crypta Xu, Ono, Kuntner, Liu & Li, 2019 — Japan (Ryukyu Is.)
- H. gayozan Xu, Ono, Kuntner, Liu & Li, 2019 — Japan (Ryukyu Is.)
- H. helios Tanikawa & Miyashita, 2014 — Japan (Ryukyu Is.)
- H. higoensis Haupt, 1983 — Japan
- H. kanenoi Ono, 1996 — Japan (Ryukyu Is.)
- H. kikuyai Ono, 1998 — Japan
- H. kimurai (Kishida, 1920) (type) — Japan
- H. kojima Xu, Ono, Kuntner, Liu & Li, 2019 — Japan (Ryukyu Is.)
- H. kubayama Xu, Ono, Kuntner, Liu & Li, 2019 — Japan (Ryukyu Is.)
- H. mae Xu, Ono, Kuntner, Liu & Li, 2019 — Japan (Ryukyu Is.)
- H. otoha Xu, Ono, Kuntner, Liu & Li, 2019 — Japan (Ryukyu Is.)
- H. shuri Xu, Ono, Kuntner, Liu & Li, 2019 — Japan (Ryukyu Is.)
- H. sumiyo Xu, Ono, Kuntner, Liu & Li, 2019 — Japan (Ryukyu Is.)
- H. tokashiki Xu, Ono, Kuntner, Liu & Li, 2019 — Japan (Ryukyu Is.)
- H. uken Xu, Ono, Kuntner, Liu & Li, 2019 — Japan (Ryukyu Is.)
- H. unten Xu, Ono, Kuntner, Liu & Li, 2019 — Japan (Ryukyu Is.)
- H. yakushimaensis Ono, 1998 — Japan
- H. yanbaruensis Haupt, 1983 — Japan (Ryukyu Is.)

== Liphistius ==
Liphistius

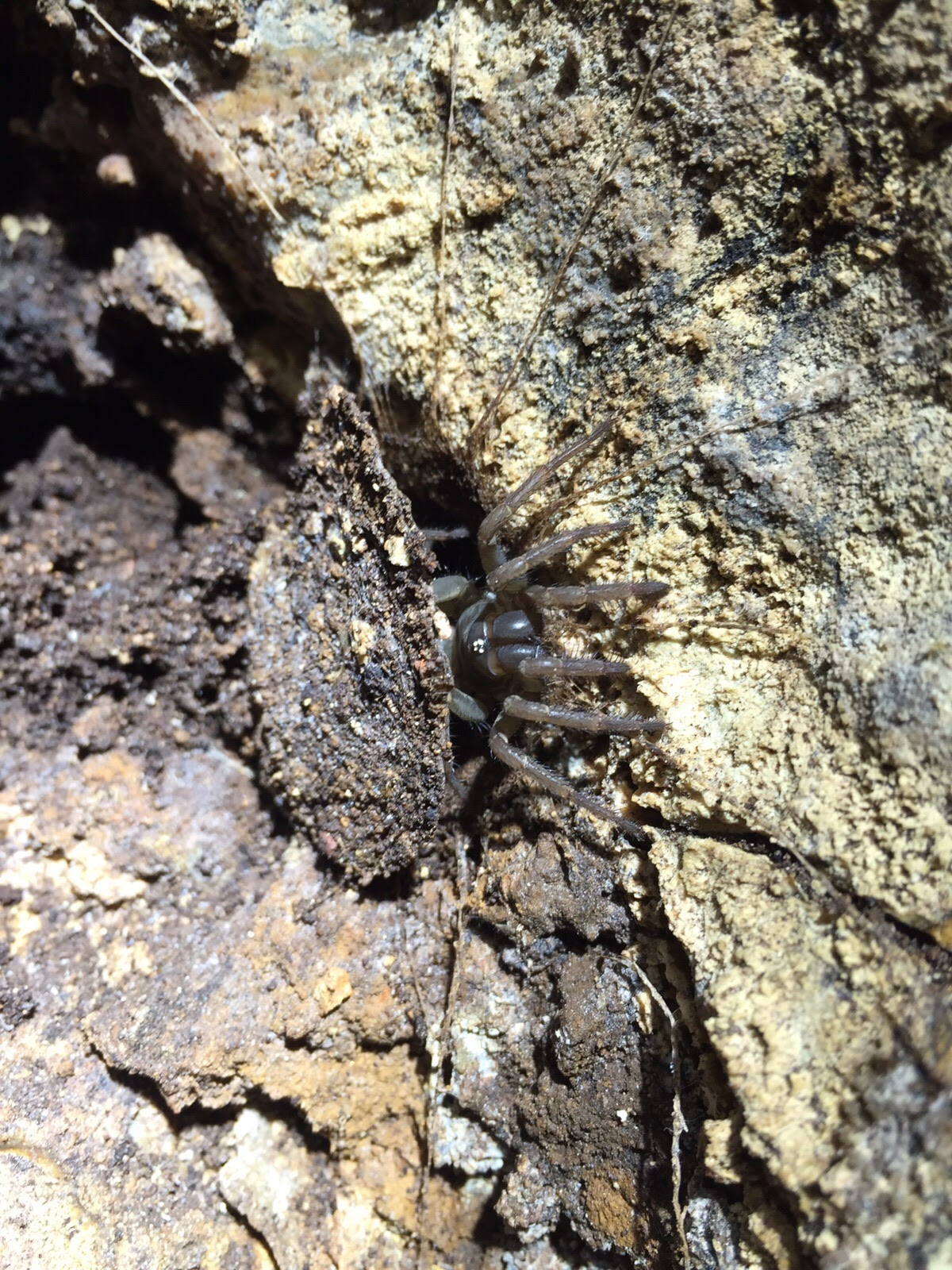
Liphistius batuensis

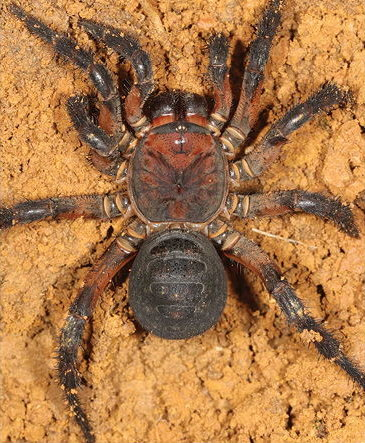
Female Liphistius birmanicus

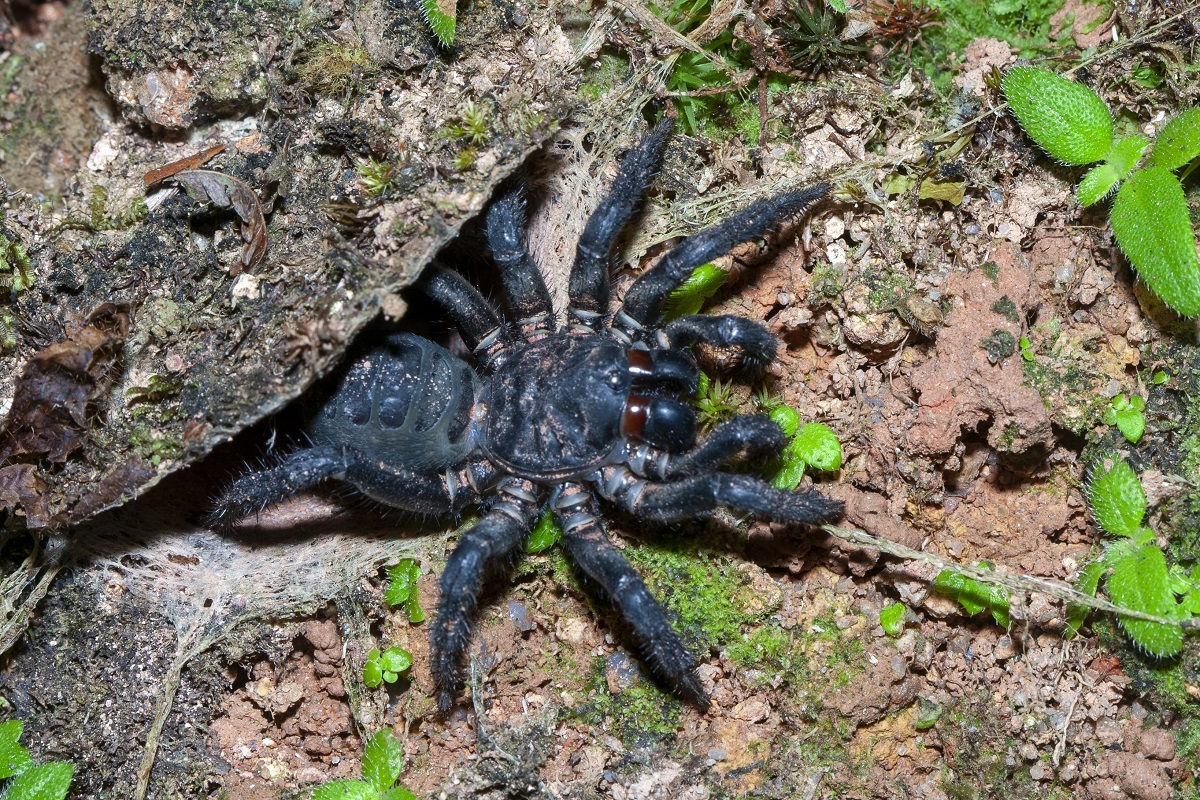
Liphistius malayanus

Liphistius Schiødte, 1849
As of July 2025, the World Spider Catalog accepted 81 species:

- L. albipes Schwendinger, 1995 – Thailand
- L. batuensis Abraham, 1923 – Malaysia
- L. bicoloripes Ono, 1988 – Thailand
- L. birmanicus Thorell, 1897 – Myanmar
- L. bristowei Platnick & Sedgwick, 1984 – Thailand
- L. buran Schwendinger, 2019 – Malaysia
- L. buyphardi Sivayyapram & Warrit, 2024 — Thailand
- L. castaneus Schwendinger, 1995 – Thailand
- L. champakpheaw Sivayyapram & Warrit, 2024 — Thailand
- L. chang Tanikawa & Petcharad, 2023 — Thailand
- L. choosaki Sivayyapram & Warrit, 2024 — Thailand
- L. cupreus (Schwendinger & Huber, 2022) – Myanmar
- L. dangrek Schwendinger, 1996 – Thailand
- L. dawei Sivayyapram & Warrit, 2024 — Myanmar
- L. desultor Schiödte, 1849 (type species) – Malaysia
- L. endau Sedgwick & Platnick, 1987 – Malaysia
- L. erawan Schwendinger, 1996 – Thailand
- L. ferox (Schwendinger & Huber, 2022) – Myanmar
- L. fuscus Schwendinger, 1995 – Thailand
- L. gracilis Schwendinger, 2017 – Malaysia
- L. hatyai (Zhan & Xu, 2022) – Thailand
- L. hintung Sivayyapram & Warrit, 2024 — Thailand
- L. hpruso Aung, Xu, Lwin, Sang, Yu, H. Liu, F. X. Liu & Li, 2019 – Myanmar
- L. indra Schwendinger, 2017 – Malaysia
- L. inthanon (Zhan & Xu, 2022) – Thailand
- L. isan Schwendinger, 1998 – Thailand, Laos
- L. jarujini Ono, 1988 – Thailand
- L. johore Platnick & Sedgwick, 1984 – Malaysia
- L. kaengkhoi Sivayyapram & Warrit, 2024 — Thailand
- L. kalaw Zhan & Xu, 2024 — Myanmar
- L. kanpetlet Zhan & Xu, 2024 — Myanmar
- L. kanthan Platnick, 1997 – Malaysia
- L. keeratikiati (Zhan & Xu, 2022) – Thailand
- L. lahu Schwendinger, 1998 – Thailand
- L. langkawi Platnick & Sedgwick, 1984 – Malaysia
- L. lannaianus Schwendinger, 1990 – Thailand
- L. lansak Sivayyapram & Warrit, 2024 — Thailand
- L. laoticus Schwendinger, 2013 – Laos
- L. laruticus Schwendinger, 1997 – Malaysia
- L. linang Schwendinger, 2017 – Malaysia
- L. liz Lin & Li, 2023 — China
- L. lordae Platnick & Sedgwick, 1984 – Myanmar
- L. maewongensis Sivayyapram, Smith, Weingdow & Warrit, 2017 – Thailand
- L. malayanus Abraham, 1923 – Malaysia
- L. marginatus Schwendinger, 1990 – Thailand
- L. metopiae Schwendinger, 2022 – Thailand
- L. murphyorum Platnick & Sedgwick, 1984 – Malaysia
- L. nabang Yu, F. Zhang & J. X. Zhang, 2021 – China
- L. nawngau Zhan & Xu, 2024 — Myanmar
- L. negara Schwendinger, 2017 – Malaysia
- L. nesioticus Schwendinger, 1996 – Thailand
- L. niphanae Ono, 1988 – Thailand
- L. ochraceus Ono & Schwendinger, 1990 – Thailand
- L. onoi Schwendinger, 1996 – Thailand
- L. ornatus Ono & Schwendinger, 1990 – Thailand
- L. owadai Ono & Schwendinger, 1990 – Thailand
- L. panching Platnick & Sedgwick, 1984 – Malaysia
- L. phileion Schwendinger, 1998 – Thailand
- L. phuketensis Schwendinger, 1998 – Thailand
- L. pilok Tanikawa & Petcharad, 2023 — Thailand
- L. pinlaung Aung, Xu, Lwin, Sang, Yu, H. Liu, F. X. Liu & Li, 2019 – Myanmar
- L. platnicki (Schwendinger & Huber, 2022) – Myanmar
- L. priceae Schwendinger, 2017 – Malaysia
- L. pusohm Schwendinger, 1996 – Thailand
- L. pyinoolwin Xu, Yu, Aung, Yu, Liu, Lwin, Sang & Li, 2021 – Myanmar
- L. rostratus Zhan & Xu, 2024 — Myanmar
- L. sayam Schwendinger, 1998 – Thailand
- L. schwendingeri Ono, 1988 – Thailand
- L. sumatranus Thorell, 1890 – Indonesia (Sumatra)
- L. suwat Schwendinger, 1996 – Thailand
- L. tanakai Ono & Aung, 2020 – Myanmar
- L. tempurung Platnick, 1997 – Malaysia
- L. tenuis Schwendinger, 1996 – Thailand
- L. thaleri Schwendinger, 2009 – Thailand
- L. tham Sedgwick & Schwendinger, 1990 – Thailand
- L. thoranie Schwendinger, 1996 – Thailand
- L. tioman Platnick & Sedgwick, 1984 – Malaysia
- L. trang Platnick & Sedgwick, 1984 – Thailand
- L. tung Schwendinger, 2022 – Myanmar
- L. yamasakii Ono, 1988 – Thailand
- L. yangae Platnick & Sedgwick, 1984 – Thailand, Malaysia

== Luthela ==
Luthela Xu & Li, 2022

- Luthela asuka Wei & Lin, 2023 – China
- Luthela badong Xu, Yu, Liu & Li, 2022 – China
- Luthela beijing Wei & Lin, 2023 – China
- Luthela dengfeng Xu, Yu, Liu & Li, 2022 – China
- Luthela handan Xu, Yu, Liu & Li, 2022 – China
- Luthela kagami Wei & Lin, 2023 – China
- Luthela luotianensis (Yin, Tang, Zhao & Chen, 2002) – China
- Luthela schensiensis (Schenkel, 1953) – China
- Luthela taian Xu, Yu, Liu & Li, 2022 – China
- Luthela yiyuan Xu, Yu, Liu & Li, 2022 (type species) – China
- Luthela yuncheng Xu, Yu, Liu & Li, 2022 – China

== Qiongthela ==
Qiongthela Xu & Kuntner, 2015

- Q. australis (Ono, 2002) — Vietnam
- Q. baishensis Xu, 2015 (type) — China (Hainan)
- Q. baoting Yu, Liu, Zhang, Wang, Li & Xu, 2020 — China (Hainan)
- Q. bawang Xu, Liu, Kuntner & Li, 2017 — China (Hainan)
- Q. dongfang Yu, Liu, Zhang, Li & Xu, 2021 — China (Hainan)
- Q. jianfeng Xu, Liu, Kuntner & Li, 2017 — China (Hainan)
- Q. nankai Yu, Liu, Zhang, Li & Xu, 2021 — China (Hainan)
- Q. nui (Schwendinger & Ono, 2011) — Vietnam
- Q. qiongzhong Yu, Liu, Zhang, Wang, Li & Xu, 2020 — China (Hainan)
- Q. sanya Yu, Liu, Zhang, Wang, Li & Xu, 2020 — China (Hainan)
- Q. wuzhi Xu, Liu, Kuntner & Li, 2017 — China (Hainan)
- Q. yalin Yu, Liu, Zhang, Li & Xu, 2021 — China (Hainan)
- Q. yinae Xu, Liu, Kuntner & Li, 2017 — China (Hainan)
- Q. yinggezui Yu, Liu, Zhang, Wang, Li & Xu, 2020 — China (Hainan)

== Ryuthela ==
Ryuthela

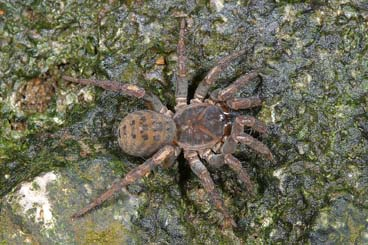
Ryuthela nishihirai, female

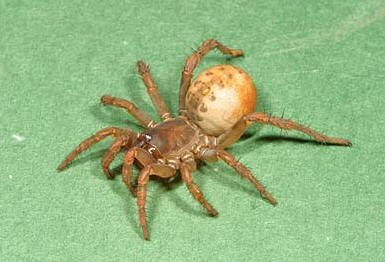
Ryuthela sasakii, female

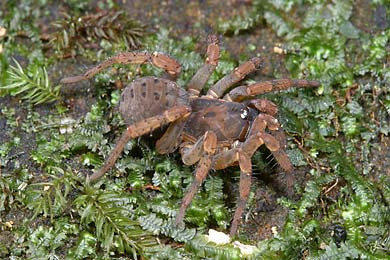
Ryuthela tanikawai, female

Ryuthela Haupt, 1983

- R. banna Xu, Liu, Ono, Chen, Kuntner & Li, 2017 — Japan (Ryukyu Is.)
- R. henoko Xu, Liu, Ono, Chen, Kuntner & Li, 2017 — Japan (Ryukyu Is.)
- R. hirakubo Xu, Liu, Ono, Chen, Kuntner & Li, 2017 — Japan (Ryukyu Is.)
- R. iheyana Ono, 2002 — Japan (Ryukyu Is.)
- R. ishigakiensis Haupt, 1983 — Japan (Ryukyu Is.)
- R. kisenbaru Xu, Liu, Ono, Chen, Kuntner & Li, 2017 — Japan (Ryukyu Is.)
- R. motobu Xu, Liu, Ono, Chen, Kuntner & Li, 2017 — Japan (Ryukyu Is.)
- R. nago Xu, Liu, Ono, Chen, Kuntner & Li, 2017 — Japan (Ryukyu Is.)
- R. nishihirai (Haupt, 1979) (type) — Japan (Ryukyu Is.)
- R. owadai Ono, 1997 — Japan (Ryukyu Is.)
- R. sasakii Ono, 1997 — Japan (Ryukyu Is.)
- R. shimojanai Xu, Liu, Ono, Chen, Kuntner & Li, 2017 — Japan (Ryukyu Is.)
- R. tanikawai Ono, 1997 — Japan (Ryukyu Is.)
- R. unten Xu, Liu, Ono, Chen, Kuntner & Li, 2017 — Japan (Ryukyu Is.)
- R. yarabu Xu, Liu, Ono, Chen, Kuntner & Li, 2017 — Japan (Ryukyu Is.)

== Songthela ==
Songthela Ono, 2000

- Songthela anhua Zhang & Xu, 2023 – China
- Songthela aokoulong De.-Q. Li, Chen, Liu, Da.-Q. Li & Xu, 2022 – China
- Songthela bispina De.-Q. Li, Chen, Liu, Da.-Q. Li & Xu, 2022 – China
- Songthela bristowei (Gertsch, 1967) – China
- Songthela ciliensis (Yin, Tang & Xu, 2003) – China
- Songthela dapo De.-Q. Li, Chen, Liu, Da.-Q. Li & Xu, 2022 – China
- Songthela goulouensis (Yin, 2001) – China
- Songthela hangzhouensis (Chen, Zhang & Zhu, 1981) (type species) – China
- Songthela huangyang Li, Liu, Li & Xu, 2020 – China
- Songthela huayanxi De.-Q. Li, Chen, Liu, Da.-Q. Li & Xu, 2022 – China
- Songthela jianganensis (Chen, Gao, Zhu & Luo, 1988) – China
- Songthela jinyun Chen, Liu, Li & Xu, 2022 – China
- Songthela lianhe De.-Q. Li, Chen, Liu, Da.-Q. Li & Xu, 2022 – China
- Songthela lingshang De.-Q. Li, Chen, Liu, Da.-Q. Li & Xu, 2022 – China
- Songthela liui Chen, Li, Li & Xu, 2021 – China
- Songthela longbao Chen, Liu, Li & Xu, 2022 – China
- Songthela longhui Zhang & Xu, 2023 – China
- Songthela mangshan (Bao, Yin & Xu, 2003) – China
- Songthela multidentata De.-Q. Li, Chen, Liu, Da.-Q. Li & Xu, 2022 – China
- Songthela pluma Yu, Li & Zhang, 2018 – China
- Songthela pyriformis Li, Liu & Xu, 2019 – China
- Songthela sapana (Ono, 2010) – Vietnam
- Songthela serriformis Chen, Liu, Li & Xu, 2022 – China
- Songthela shei (Xu & Yin, 2001) – China
- Songthela shuyuan Li, Liu & Xu, 2019 – China
- Songthela tianmen De.-Q. Li, Chen, Liu, Da.-Q. Li & Xu, 2022 – China
- Songthela tianzhu Chen, Li, Li & Xu, 2021 – China
- Songthela unispina De.-Q. Li, Chen, Liu, Da.-Q. Li & Xu, 2022 – China
- Songthela wangerbao Chen, Liu, Li & Xu, 2022 – China
- Songthela wosanensis (Wang & Jiao, 1995) – China
- Songthela xiangnan Li, Liu, Li & Xu, 2020 – China
- Songthela xianningensis (Yin, Tang, Zhao & Chen, 2002) – China
- Songthela xiujian De.-Q. Li, Chen, Liu, Da.-Q. Li & Xu, 2022 – China
- Songthela yunnanensis (Song & Haupt, 1984) – China
- Songthela yuping Chen, Li, Li & Xu, 2021 – China
- Songthela zhongpo Zhang & Xu, 2023 – China
- Songthela zimugang De.-Q. Li, Chen, Liu, Da.-Q. Li & Xu, 2022 – China
- Songthela zizhu De.-Q. Li, Chen, Liu, Da.-Q. Li & Xu, 2022 – China

== Vinathela ==
Vinathela Ono, 2000

- V. abca (Ono, 1999) — Vietnam
- V. cucphuongensis (Ono, 1999) (type) — Vietnam
- V. hongkong (Song & Wu, 1997) — China (Hong Kong)
- V. hunanensis (Song & Haupt, 1984) — China
- V. nahang Logunov & Vahtera, 2017 — Vietnam
- V. nenglianggu Li, Liu & Xu, 2019 — China
- V. tomokunii (Ono, 1997) — Vietnam
- V. tonkinensis (Bristowe, 1933) — Vietnam
