= Frances Murphy =

British arachnologist (1926–1995)

Frances Mary Murphy
- Born: 29 April 1926; England, UK
- Died: 20 July 1995 (aged 69)
- Education: Bedford College, London University
- Known for: Study of arachnids
- Spouse: John Alan Murphy (m. 1949–1995)
- Scientific career
- Fields: Arachnology
- Workplaces: Fairey Aviation

Frances Mary Murphy (29 April 1926 – 20 July 1995) was a British arachnologist, nature photographer and first woman president of the British Entomological & Natural History Society.

== Biography ==
=== Early life ===
Murphy was born Frances Mary Wrangham to His Honour Judge Sir Geoffrey Walter and Mary Winkworth, in England on the 29th of April 1926. She spent her early years living with her mother, father and younger brother Edward Addison Wrangham, who became a notable collector of Japanese art. Her mother died when she was seven years old. Her parents were both interested in the natural world, and Murphy took after them in this regard. She would often explore the local natural environment during school holidays.

=== Education and early career ===
Murphy attended a boarding school before studying Mathematics at Bedford College, London University. She enrolled in 1943, however a period of acute kidney issues meant she had to have surgery. This led to a year long absence, but Murphy was able to complete her course in 1948.

Following graduation, Murphy was employed at Fairey Aviation, an aircraft manufacturer, where she undertook calculations of flight paths in their guided missile section. This post was typical for educated women during wartime and post-war Britain. However, Fairey Aviation was later acquired by Vickers prompting Murphy to leave soon after. The company was later liquidated entirely.

=== Personal life ===
At Fairey, Murphy met her husband John Alan Murphy (1922–2021), whom she married in 1949. They remained married until her death in 1995, from kidney disease.

== Scientific career ==
During the late 50s and early 60s, Murphy became interested in spiders. She joined The Flatford Mill Spider Group in 1962, which later became the British Arachnological Society. Here she undertook field studies course on spiders which was the beginning of her scientific career.

Murphy's poor drawing ability was initially a barrier to her observations of species. She overcame this in two ways, firstly by keeping live specimens in captivity so that they may be more accurately captured, and secondly by capturing photographs of specimens. Over her career, Murphy had her photographs published widely in arachnological media.

In 1987, the British Arachnological Society began the Spider Recording Scheme, Murphy was the first woman to become an area organizer for the project. She managed the Surrey Vice County until 1989.

Overall, Murphy was a member of 13 arachnological groups and natural history societies. She notably was the first woman to be the President of the British Entomological & Natural History Society in 1989.

Over the course of her career, and continued by her husband, the Murphys collected some 45,000 specimens which are now held by Manchester Museum.

=== Memberships ===
- The Flatford Mill Spider Group - Member from 1962
- British Arachnological Society - Founding Member 1968
- British Arachnological Society - Ordinary Member 1989-1992
- British Tarantula Society
- The Spider Club of Southern Africa
- The Australasian Arachnological Society
- The centre International de Documentation Arachnologique
- The Société Européen d'Arachnologie
- Friends of the Natural History Museum - founder and member
- British Entomological & Natural History Society - Member, Secretary and President (1989)

=== Species and genera named in her honour ===
==== Spiders ====
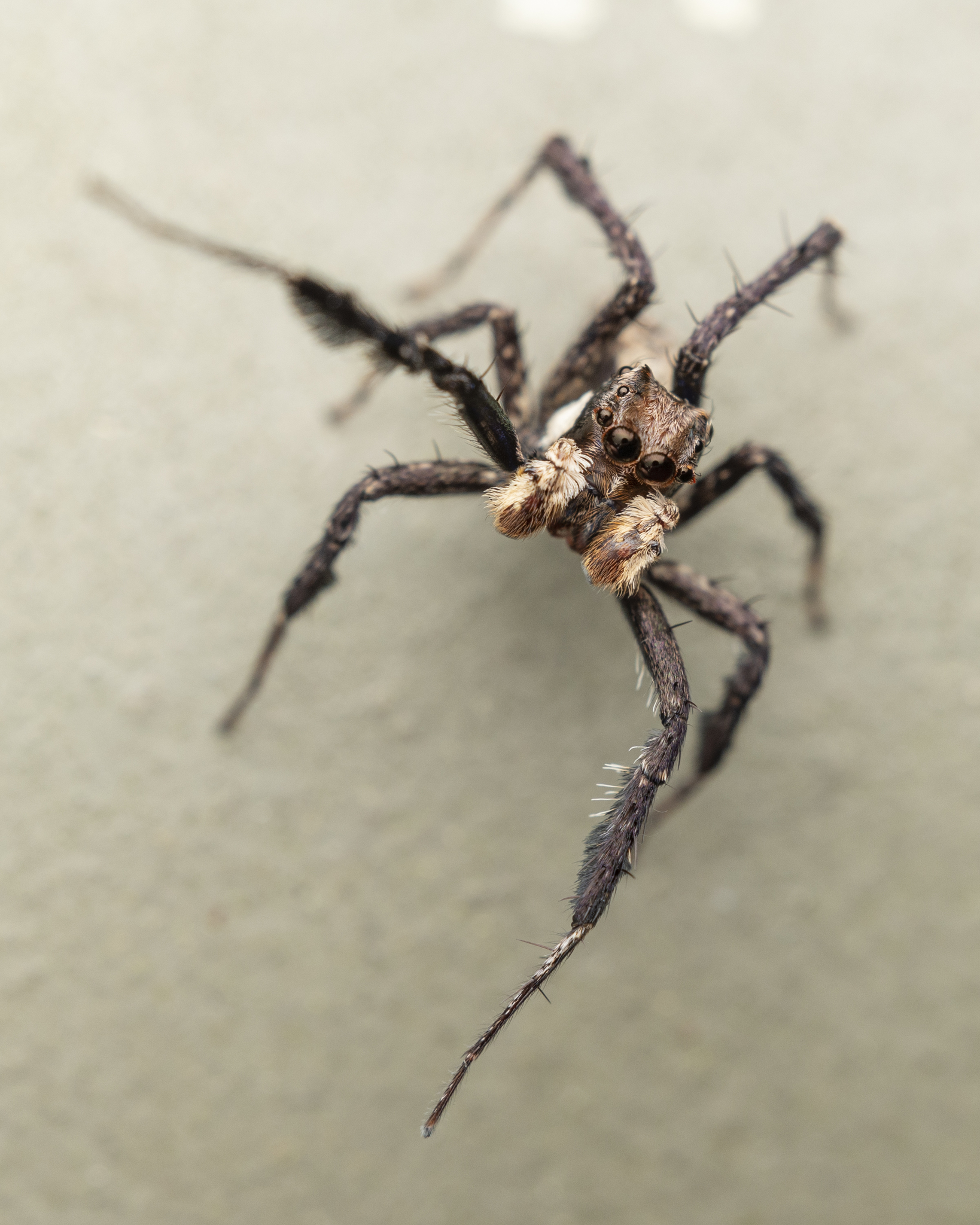
Portia orientalis

- Asemonea murphyae (Wanless, 1980)
- Acusilas gentin gensis (Murphy & Murphy, 1983)
- Acusilas malaccensis (Murphy & Murphy, 1983)
- Portia orientalis (Murphy & Murphy, 1983)
- Liphistius murphyorum (Platnick & Sedgwick, 1984)
- Dysdera murphyorum (Deeleman-Reinhold, 1988)
- Diores murphyorum (Jocqué, 1990)
- Eumenophorus murphyorum (Smith, 1990)
- Zodarion murphyorum (Bosmans, 1994)
- Murphydium (Jocqué, 1996)
- Neaetha murphyorum (Prószyński, 2000)
- Zelotes murphyorum (FitzPatrick, 2007)
- Heteroonops murphyorum (Platnick & Dupérré, 2009)
- Stenoonops murphyorum (Platnick & Dupérré,2010)
- Pescennia murphyorum (Platnick & Dupérré,2011)
- Mallinella murphyorum (Dankittipakul, Jocqué

& Singtripop, 2012)

- Tropizodium murphyorum (Dankittipakul,

Jocqué & Singtripop, 2012)

- Costarina murphyorum (Platnick & Berniker, 2014)
- Aelurillus murphyorum (Azarkina, 2022)
- Alopecosa murphyorum (Zamani, Nadolny, Esyunin & Marusik, 2022)
- Lycosoides murphyorum (Bosmans, Lecigne, Benhalima & Aborous-Kherbouche, 2022)
- Locketina murphyorum (Tanasevitch, 2022)
- Murphyarachne (Sherwood & Gabriel, 2022)
- Murphydrela francescae (Jocqué & RussellSmith, 2022)
- Patelloceto murphyorum (Pett, 2022)
- Sceliraptor murphyorum (Zonstein & Marusik, 2022)

==== Genera ====
- Roncocreagris murphyorum (Judson, 1992) (pseudoscorpion)

== Selected works ==
=== Books ===
- (1980). Keeping Spiders, Insects and other Land Invertebrates Edinburgh: John Bartholomew & Son (Bartholomew Pet Care Series)
- (2000). An Introduction to the Spiders of South East Asia Malaysian Nature Society

=== Selected papers ===
- Murphy, F. and Tongiorgi, P., 1979. Arctosa villica (Lucas) 1846: drawings and observations. Bulletin of the British Arachnological Society, 4(9), pp. 402–406.
- Forster, L.M. and Murphy, F.M., 1986. Ecology and behaviour in Portia schultzii, with notes on related species (Araneae, Salticidae). Journal of Arachnology, pp. 29–42.
