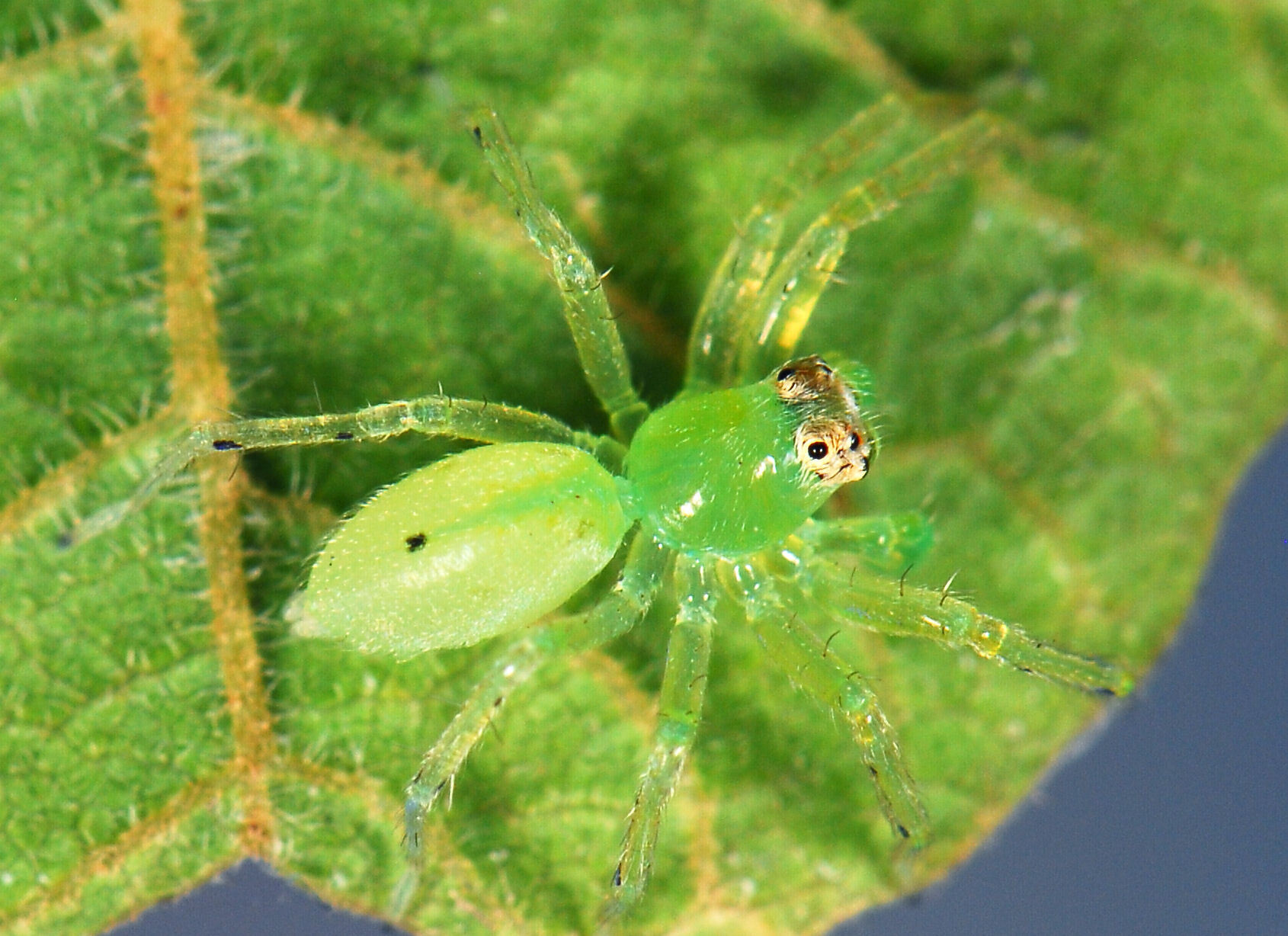
- Dorsal view of a juvenile male
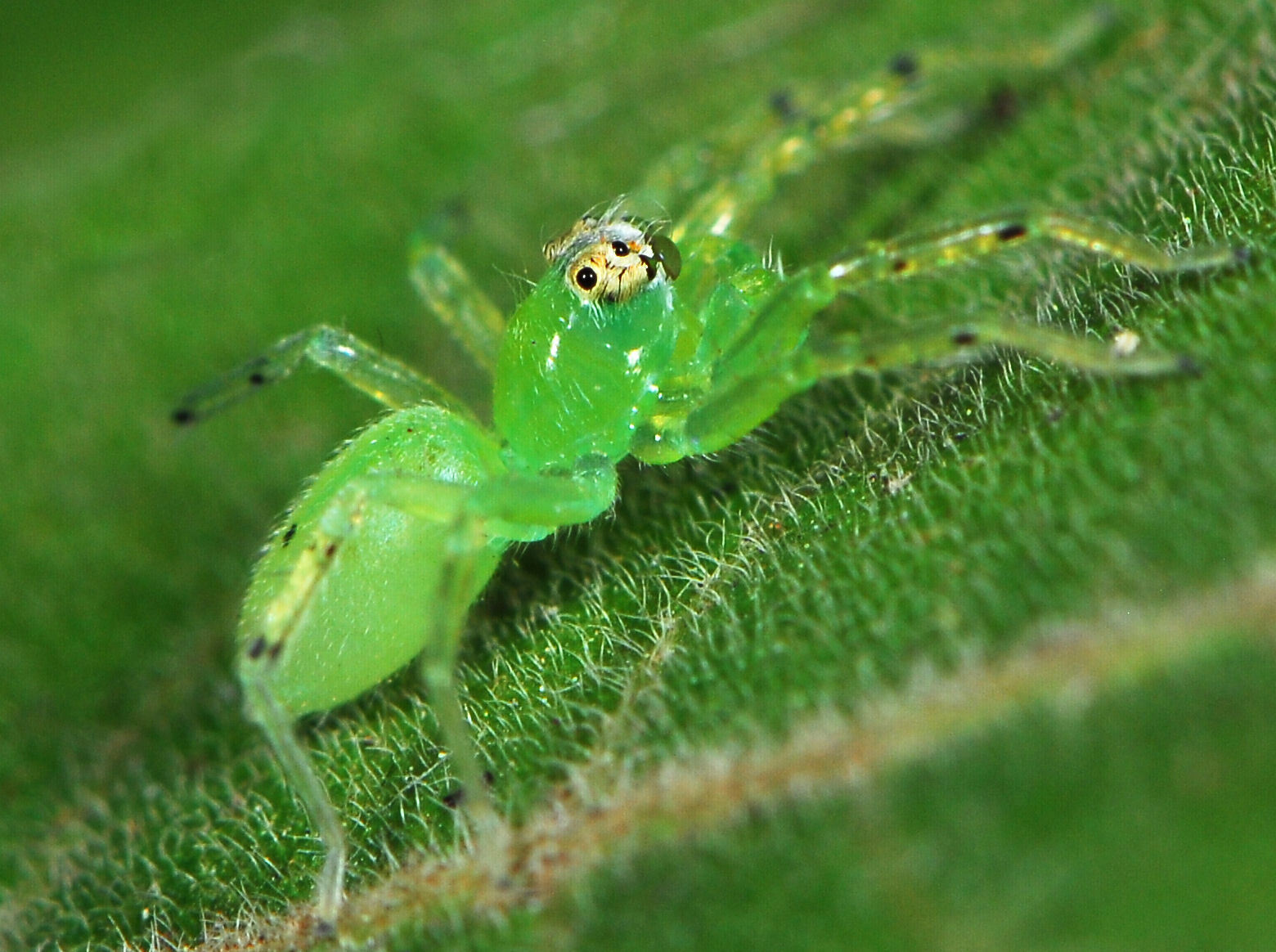
- Lateral view of the same spider

Scientific classification
- Kingdom: Animalia
- Phylum: Arthropoda
- Subphylum: Chelicerata
- Class: Arachnida
- Order: Araneae
- Infraorder: Araneomorphae
- Family: Salticidae
- Subfamily: Asemoneinae
- Genus: Asemonea
- Species: A. murphyae

Binomial name
- Asemonea murphyae Wanless, 1980

Synonyms
- Asemonea murphyi Wanless, 1980

= Asemonea murphyae =

Murphy's Asemonea jumping spider

Species of spider

Asemonea murphyae, or Murphy's Asemonea jumping spider, is a species of jumping spider in the genus Asemonea that has been found in Kenya and South Africa. It spins sheet webs on the underside of leaves, where the female will also lay closely-packed eggs. First described in 1980 by Fred Wanless, the spider is named after the British arachnologist Frances Murphy. Asemonea murphyae thrives in a wide range of environments, particularly by the side of rivers, streams, and tracks. A small spider, with a forward section (or carapace) that is between 1.48 and 2.00 mm (1/16 and 1/16 in) long, and behind that, an abdomen between 2.4 mm (1/8 in) long, it is generally yellow with a green tint that enables it to blend into its environment. The female is smaller than the male. The species can be distinguished from other spiders in the same genus by its copulatory organs, particularly the design of the female's epigyne and of the male's pedipalp with a distinctive forked spike on its palpal tibia. Unlike other jumping spiders, Asemonea murphyae moults in the open.

== Taxonomy and etymology ==
Asemonea murphyae is a species of jumping spider, a member of the family Salticidae, that was first described by the British arachnologist Fred Wanless in 1980. He originally allocated the species to the genus Asemonea, first circumscribed by Octavius Pickard-Cambridge in 1869. The genus is related to Lyssomanes. Molecular analysis demonstrates that the genus is similar to Goleba and Pandisus.

In Wayne Maddison's 2015 study of spider phylogenetic classification, the genus Asemonea was the type genus for the subfamily Asemoneinae, split from Lyssomaninae. A year later, in 2016, Jerzy Prószyński named it as the type genus for the Asemoneines group of genera, which was also named after the genus. The spider is named after Frances Murphy, a leading member of the British Arachnological Society. The species was originally named Asemonea murphyi but was later renamed with its current ending by Wanda Wesołowska and Charles R. Haddad in 2001. The spider is known as Murphy's Asemonea jumping spider.

== Description ==
Asemonea murphyae is small with a typical total length of between 3.4 and 3.92 mm (1/8 and 1/8 in). It has a body divided into two main sections. The male has a pear-shaped carapace, the upper part of its main forward section, that is between 1.78 and 2.00 mm (1/16 and 1/16 in) long and between 1.5 and 1.58 mm (1/16 and 1/16 in) wide. It is yellowish-orange or yellow-brown with a lighter whitish or whitish-yellow eye field, with some specimen having an iridescent green shine to the surface. Its eyes are mounted on tubercles and in the majority cases surrounded by black markings or a fringe of white hair. The part of the underside of this forward section, called its sternum, is heart-shaped and whitish-yellow. The spider's face, or clypeus is pale yellow, some specimen having sooty markings. Its chelicerae are pale yellow or whitish with two teeth to the front and five to the back, meanwhile the part of its mouthparts known as its labium and maxillae are shiny whitish-yellow.

The main rear section of the male spider, its abdomen, is pale yellow and between 2.18 and 2.5 mm (1/16 and 1/8 in) long and typically 1.3 mm (1/16 in) wide. It has a faint dark pattern on its upper surface. The spider's spinnerets are long, thin, and pale yellow, apart from the very tips. The spider has long thin legs that are generally of pale yellow color, ranging from whitish-yellow to yellow-brown. They have patches of black on them. Its pedipalps, sensory organs near its face, are orange-brown with a thin palpal femur and a furrow on its top surface. At the end of its pedipalp is its copulatory organs. It has a long thin apophysis, or spike, on its femur and an apophysis on the tibia that has a forked end.

The female looks similar to the male although it is slightly smaller, typically between 3.4 and 3.42 mm (1/8 and 1/8 in) in total length with a carapace that is between 1.48 and 1.52 mm (1/16 and 1/16 in) long and 1.2 mm (1/16 in) wide and an abdomen typically 1.96 mm (1/16 in) long. Its carapace is pale yellow, tending to whitish-yellow in the eye field. There are traces of black bands across its surface. Its eyes are surrounded by black rings and creamy-white hairs, while its sternum is shiny whitish yellow. Its clypeus, maxillae and labium are pale yellow, its clypeus having a scattering of fine whitish hairs visible on its surface. It has shiny yellow-brown chelicerae. The female spider's abdomen is whitish-yellow with a pattern of scattered black spots and bars. It has pale yellow spinnerets and whitish-yellow to pale yellow-brown legs. The visible external part of its copulatory organs, known as its epigyne, has a small depression in the centre. Two copulatory openings lead via simple seminal ducts to large bulbous spermathecae, or receptacles.

The spider is similar to other species in the genus and can be confused with the related Asemonea maculata, particularly as the pattern on its abdomen is alike. It can be distinguished from Asemonea fimbriata by the lack of hairs on its legs, but can be most easily differentiated from other species by its copulatory organs. The male's forked tibial apophysis is particularly distinctive. The female is similar to Asamonea ornatissima, only differing in the internal structure of its epigyne.

== Behaviour ==
Like other Asemonea spiders, Asemonea murphyae rarely jumps. Instead, the spider will generally walk and run. It spins sheet webs on the underside of leaves, where the female will lay its eggs. The eggs are generally placed close together. The spider is predominantly a diurnal hunter that uses its good eyesight to spot its prey. It preys on a range of insects, but rarely eats flies as it can prey on the latter only when they are caught in its web. The spider is also likely to eat nectar if it is available. It uses visual cues during courtship and transmits vibratory signals through silk to communicate to other spiders. Unlike other jumping spiders, Asemonea murphyae moults in the open.

== Distribution and habitat ==
Asemonea murphyae has been found in Kenya and South Africa. The female paratype was discovered in forest near Kitale in central Kenya in 1972 and the male holotype near Naro Moru in 1974. Both were found by Frances Murphy and held in her collection. The spider has been subsequently seen in various places in the west and central parts of Kenya. It lives in liminal spaces, including shaded bushes on riversides and low shrubs at track edges. It has also been found near rivers and streams on the side of Mount Elgon at altitudes between 2,130 and 2,250 m (6,990 and 7,380 ft) above sea level.

In South Africa, the spider was seen for the first time near Cathedral Peak in KwaZulu-Natal at an altitude of 1,200 m (3,900 ft) above sea level. It has been found in low-growing grasses and ferns in Afromontane grassland. As it has a wide distribution, its conservation status is considered of least concern.
