= Liphistius sumatranus =

Scientific classification
- Kingdom: Animalia
- Phylum: Arthropoda
- Subphylum: Chelicerata
- Class: Arachnida
- Order: Araneae
- Suborder: Mesothelae
- Family: Liphistiidae
- Subfamily: Liphistiinae
- Genus: Liphistius
- Species: L. sumatranus

Binomial name
- Liphistius sumatranus Thorell, 1890

Synonyms
- Anadiastothele thorelli Simon, 1903; Liphistius thorelli Bristowe, 1932

Species of spider

Liphistius sumatranus is a species of spider in the subfamily Liphistiinae of the family Liphistiidae, native to Sumatra in Indonesia.

== Taxonomy ==
The species was actually first described in 1882, but was misidentified as Liphistius desultor, which occurs further north in Malaysia. It was formally named in 1890 by Tamerlan Thorell.

== Description ==
Liphistius sumatranus shares features with all members of the suborder Mesothelae: plates (tergites) marking segments on the upper surface of the abdomen, unlike all other groups of spiders; daggerlike downward pointing chelicerae; and spinnerets in the middle of the abdomen, rather than at the end. Their respiratory system consists only of book lungs, which could help explain why mesotheles are relatively inactive.

The female of Liphistius sumatranus has a body length of about 23 mm (excluding the chelicerae). The carapace is about 11 mm long and wide, and is light brown with some lighter patches at the front and darker margins at the sides and the rear. The abdomen is about 11 mm long and 9 mmm wide. Its overall colour is brownish grey. The sclerites and spinnerets are more orange. The legs are brown, except for the femora, which are mostly orange. The fourth leg is longest, about 38 mm, the others being more-or-less equal in length at 26–28 mm. The male is generally similar to the female, although smaller, with a total body length of about 13 mm. The fourth leg is again the longest, at about 33 mm. In their final moult, males lose the orange femora, and have more evenly coloured legs.

Liphistius sumatranus appears to be closely related to L. desultor, but the female of the latter has a bright orange carapace, and there are differences in the genitalia of both males and females.

== Distribution ==
Liphistius sumatranus is native to Sumatra in Indonesia. As of November 2025, it is the only species in the genus that was known to be native outside Japan, China and mainland South-east Asia.
