= Murphyarachne =

Scientific classification
- Kingdom: Animalia
- Phylum: Arthropoda
- Subphylum: Chelicerata
- Class: Arachnida
- Order: Araneae
- Infraorder: Mygalomorphae
- Family: Theraphosidae
- Genus: Murphyarachne; Sherwood & Gabriel, 2022
- Species: M. ymasumacae

Binomial name
- Murphyarachne ymasumacae Sherwood & Gabriel, 2022

Genus of spider

Murphyarachne is a monotypic genus of Peruvian tarantulas, with one species, Murphyarachne ymasumacae. It was first described by Sherwood and Gabriel in 2022. The genus is named after Frances Mary Murphy (1926 to 1995) and John Alan Murphy (1922 to 2021) for their contributions to arachnology, and the Greek term "arachne", which is the word for spider.

== Description ==
Murphyarachne ymasumacae is named after Yma Sumac, a famous Peruvian opera singer. Its coloration at least preserved in alcohol is brown. The carapace has some patterning radiating from the femora, patellae, tibiae, and the pedipalp show some striping.

=== Diagnosis ===
This genus and species can be distinguished by the following features, such as the presence of lyre like stridulating hairs on the retrolateral palpal trochanter. And the spermatheca with two elongated receptacles which are fused forming a "Y" shape, they also own type 1 urticating hairs, with no pattern in the opisthosoma.

== Habitat ==
They are found in Contamana, Peru, which is home to a tropical rainforest climate where temperatures are an average of 26°C, with average yearly rainfall of 2500mm.
