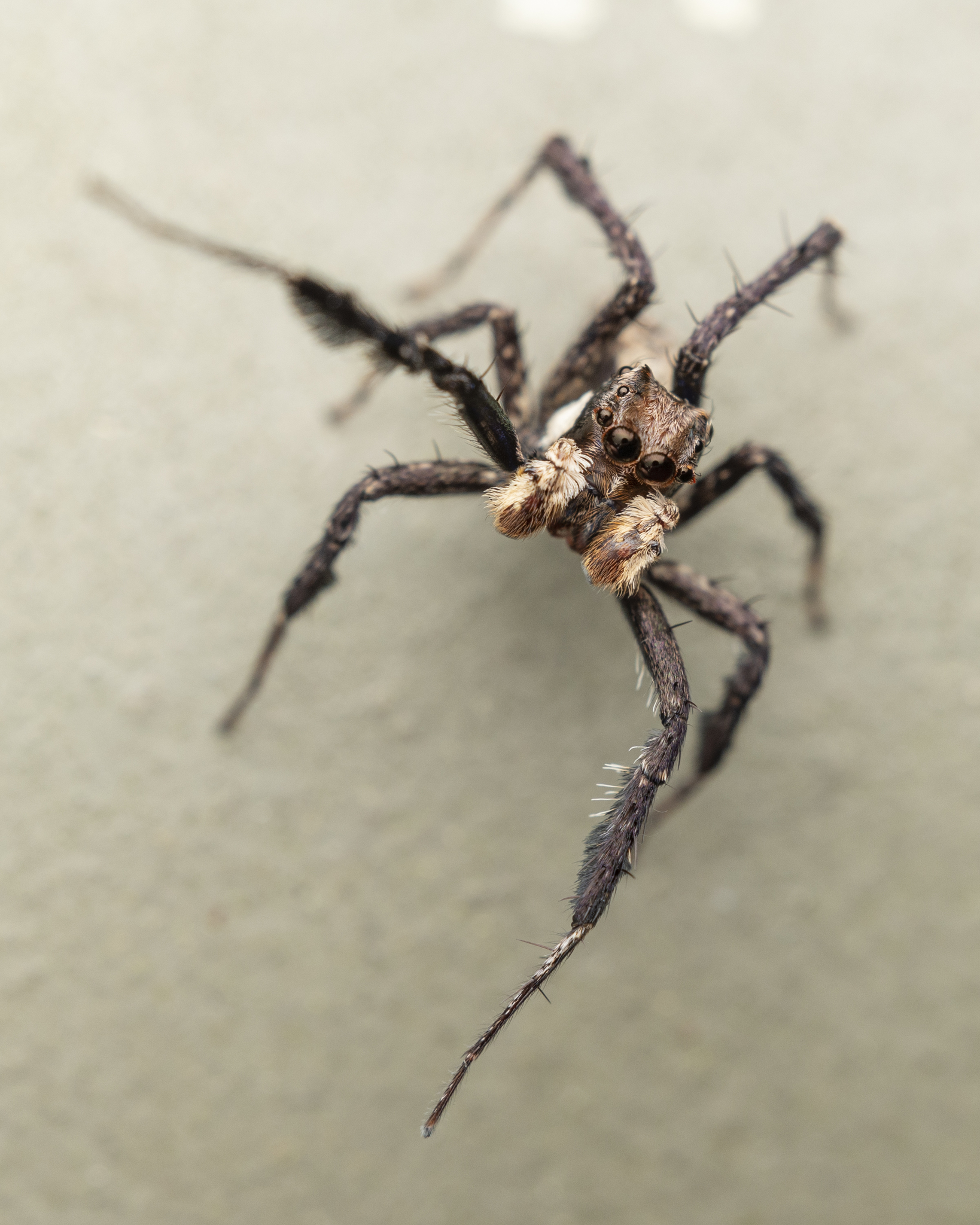
- from Hong Kong

Scientific classification
- Kingdom: Animalia
- Phylum: Arthropoda
- Subphylum: Chelicerata
- Class: Arachnida
- Order: Araneae
- Infraorder: Araneomorphae
- Family: Salticidae
- Genus: Portia
- Species: P. orientalis

Binomial name
- Portia orientalis J. Murphy & F. Murphy, 1983

= Portia orientalis =

Species of spider

Portia orientalis is a species of jumping spider in the genus Portia. It has only been found in Hong Kong. Only the male has been described.

== Taxonomy ==
Portia orientalis was first described in 1983 by John Murphy and Frances Murphy based on a single male specimen from Hong Kong. The species is closely related to Portia assamensis and Portia labiata, but can be distinguished by differences in the male palp structure, particularly the shape of the embolus and palpal tibia.

== Distribution ==
P. orientalis is known only from Hong Kong where the holotype was collected. The species is known only from the type specimen.

== Description ==
The male holotype measures 7.6 mm in total length, with a carapace length of 3.4 mm. The carapace is orange-brown in color, lighter in the eye region, and covered with light orange hairs. A distinctive feature is the presence of pronounced orange tufts of hair near the posterior lateral eyes, which distinguishes it from related species P. assamensis and P. labiata. The carapace has a parallel white band running from the fovea to the posterior margin and broad white lateral bands along the margins.

The chelicerae are parallel and orange-brown with dark longitudinal marks, bearing three teeth on each margin. The legs are uniformly dark orange in color, with the metatarsi and tarsi being somewhat lighter. Unlike related species, the femora III and IV lack annulations.

The male palp shows several distinguishing features. The central finger-like apophysis on the ventral side of the palpal tibia is very pale, small, and hidden within a tuft of long white hairs. The embolus narrows gradually from its basal section, which differs from the narrow embolus of P. assamensis and the suddenly narrowing embolus of P. labiata.
