= Ganthela =

Scientific classification
- Kingdom: Animalia
- Phylum: Arthropoda
- Subphylum: Chelicerata
- Class: Arachnida
- Order: Araneae
- Suborder: Mesothelae
- Family: Liphistiidae
- Subfamily: Heptathelinae
- Genus: Ganthela; Xu & Kuntner, 2015

Type species
- Ganthela yundingensis

Species
- 7, see text

Genus of spiders

Ganthela is a genus of spiders in the subfamily Heptathelinae, family Liphistiidae. It was first described in 2015. As of 2017, it contains seven species, all of them from China.

== Species ==
Ganthela comprises the following species:

- Ganthela cipingensis (Wang, 1989)
- Ganthela jianensis Xu, Kuntner & Chen, 2015
- Ganthela qingyuanensis Xu, Kuntner & Liu, 2015
- Ganthela venus Xu, 2015
- Ganthela wangjiangensis Xu, Kuntner & Liu, 2015
- Ganthela xianyouensis Xu, Kuntner & Chen, 2015
- Ganthela yundingensis Xu, 2015
