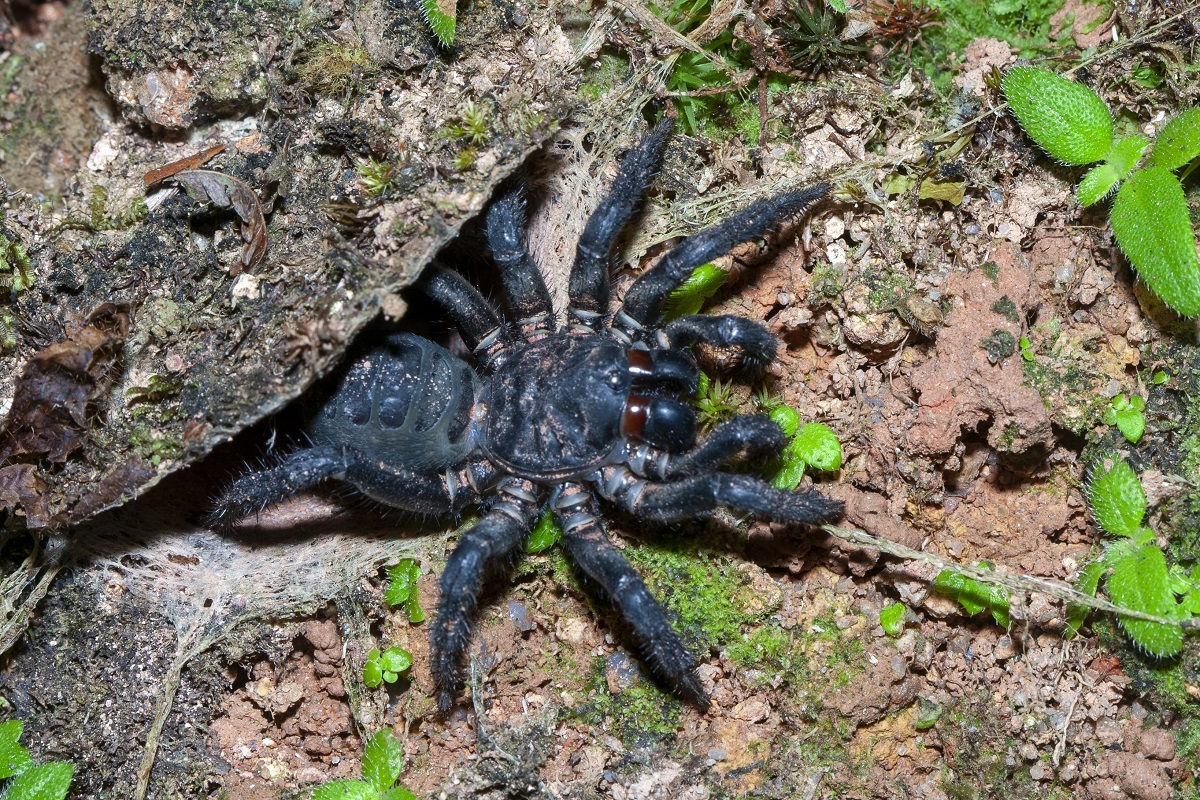
- Image of the Malayan black trapdoor spider (Liphistius malayanus) from Malaysia
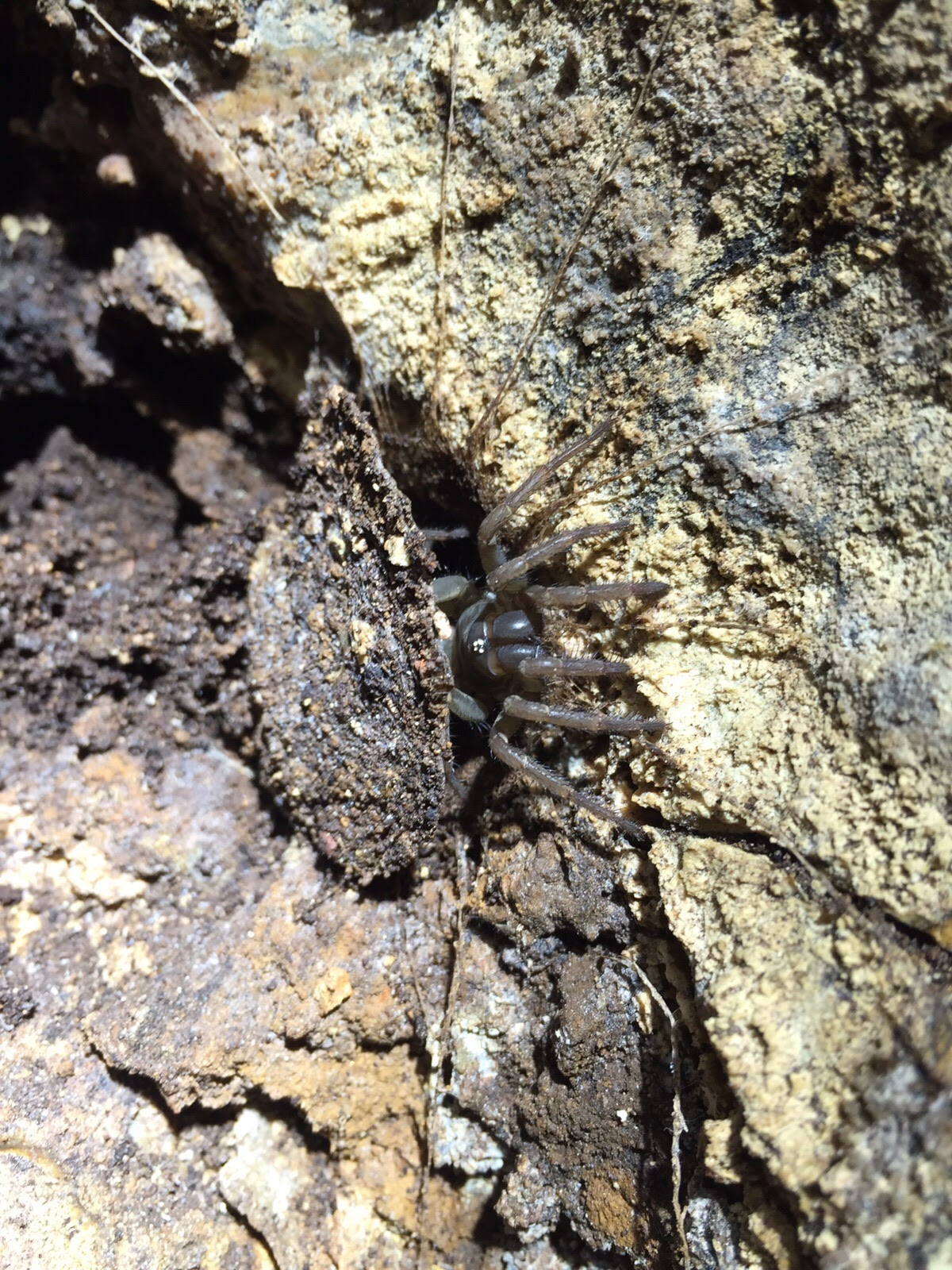
- Liphistius batuensis at the trap door

Scientific classification
- Kingdom: Animalia
- Phylum: Arthropoda
- Subphylum: Chelicerata
- Class: Arachnida
- Order: Araneae
- Suborder: Mesothelae
- Family: Liphistiidae
- Subfamily: Liphistiinae; Thorell, 1869
- Genus: Liphistius; Schiødte, 1849

Species
- 79; See text

= Liphistius =

Genus of trapdoor spider

Liphistius is a genus of basal trapdoor spiders. It is the only genus in the subfamily Liphistiinae, one of the two subfamilies in the family Liphistiidae, which is the only family in the suborder Mesothelae. Species of Liphistius are found in Japan, China, and Southeast Asia.

== Taxonomy ==
The genus Liphistius was erected by Jørgen M. C. Schiødte in 1849. Schiødte spelt the name Lipistius; this was corrected to Liphistius by Tamerlan Thorell in 1869, a change endorsed by the International Commission on Zoological Nomenclature in 1970. Liphistius is from Greek λείπω, lipo ('lack') and ἱστός, histos ('web' in this context).

Thorell erected the family Liphistiidae in 1869 for the genus Liphistius. Initially, it was the only family placed in the suborder Mesothelae. In 1923, Kyukichi Kishida described a new genus, Heptathela, and suggested creating two tribes within the Liphistiidae corresponding to the genera Liphistius and Heptathela. In 1939, Alexander Petrunkevitch raised the tribe Heptatheleae to a separate family, Heptathelidae, thus restoring the narrower circumscription of the Liphistiidae. In 1985, Robert Raven reunited the two families, a view supported by Xu et al. in 2021, Breitling in 2022, and Sivayyapram et al. in 2024. Liphistius is then the only genus in the subfamily Liphistiinae, the other subfamily being Heptathelinae. Other authors have maintained two separate families, a position not accepted by the World Spider Catalog as of October 2025.

=== Phylogeny ===
Molecular phylogenetic studies have repeatedly shown that the suborder Mesothelae is monophyletic, at least as regards extant (living) species, with the two subfamilies or families forming separate clades:

- Mesothelae
  - Liphistiinae or Liphistiidae
    - Liphistius
  - Heptathelinae or Heptathelidae
    7 genera

== Biology ==
Liphistius species share features with the subfamily Heptathelinae. They are medium to large spiders. They have downward pointing, daggerlike chelicerae. Like other members of the suborder Mesothelae, and unlike all other extant spiders, they have a segmented series of plates (tergites) on the upper surface of all segments of the abdomen and their spinnerets are placed in the middle of the underside of the abdomen, rather than at the end. Their sternum (a plate on the underside of the cephalothorax) is narrow, and there is another smaller ventral plate (the sternite) between the fourth pair of legs. The carapace is mostly flat, though it can be slightly elevated near the head. The eyes are distinctly clustered together on a single nodule. The anterior median eyes are small, but the posterior median eyes are large and round. The lateral eyes are long and kidney-shaped. The distal leg segments have strong spines and three claws. The respiratory system consists only of book lungs, which could help explain why they are relatively inactive. Unlike heptathelines, the male palp has a tibial apophysis.

Female body lengths range from 9 to 29 mm (0.35 to 1.14 in); males are slightly smaller. They live in burrows in earthen banks, on some cave walls, and probably in forests. The burrow is sealed with a thin, circular, woven door, which is disguised with soil and moss. While they spend the day deep inside their burrows, at night they wait just below the door for insects, woodlice, and similar invertebrates that stumble over one of the seven silken lines that radiate from the entrance. Members of the subfamily Heptathelinae do not construct such signal lines. With a reluctance to leave their burrows, Liphistius species push up the door and reach for their prey. Adult males sometimes wander in search for females, but females rarely leave their burrows.

In the past, they were frequently believed to lack venom, but in 2010 it was shown that at least some Liphistius species have venom glands.

== Species ==
As of July 2025, the World Spider Catalog accepted 81 species:

- Liphistius albipes Schwendinger, 1995 – Thailand
- Liphistius batuensis Abraham, 1923 – Malaysia
- Liphistius bicoloripes Ono, 1988 – Thailand
- Liphistius birmanicus Thorell, 1897 – Myanmar
- Liphistius bristowei Platnick & Sedgwick, 1984 – Thailand
- Liphistius buran Schwendinger, 2019 – Malaysia
- Liphistius buyphardi Sivayyapram & Warrit, 2024 — Thailand
- Liphistius castaneus Schwendinger, 1995 – Thailand
- Liphistius champakpheaw Sivayyapram & Warrit, 2024 — Thailand
- Liphistius chang Tanikawa & Petcharad, 2023 — Thailand
- Liphistius choosaki Sivayyapram & Warrit, 2024 — Thailand
- Liphistius cupreus (Schwendinger & Huber, 2022) – Myanmar
- Liphistius dangrek Schwendinger, 1996 – Thailand
- Liphistius dawei Sivayyapram & Warrit, 2024 — Myanmar
- Liphistius desultor Schiödte, 1849 (type species) – Malaysia
- Liphistius endau Sedgwick & Platnick, 1987 – Malaysia
- Liphistius erawan Schwendinger, 1996 – Thailand
- Liphistius ferox (Schwendinger & Huber, 2022) – Myanmar
- Liphistius fuscus Schwendinger, 1995 – Thailand
- Liphistius gracilis Schwendinger, 2017 – Malaysia
- Liphistius hatyai (Zhan & Xu, 2022) – Thailand
- Liphistius hintung Sivayyapram & Warrit, 2024 — Thailand
- Liphistius hpruso Aung, Xu, Lwin, Sang, Yu, H. Liu, F. X. Liu & Li, 2019 – Myanmar
- Liphistius indra Schwendinger, 2017 – Malaysia
- Liphistius inthanon (Zhan & Xu, 2022) – Thailand
- Liphistius isan Schwendinger, 1998 – Thailand, Laos
- Liphistius jarujini Ono, 1988 – Thailand
- Liphistius johore Platnick & Sedgwick, 1984 – Malaysia
- Liphistius kaengkhoi Sivayyapram & Warrit, 2024 — Thailand
- Liphistius kalaw Zhan & Xu, 2024 — Myanmar
- Liphistius kanpetlet Zhan & Xu, 2024 — Myanmar
- Liphistius kanthan Platnick, 1997 – Malaysia
- Liphistius keeratikiati (Zhan & Xu, 2022) – Thailand
- Liphistius lahu Schwendinger, 1998 – Thailand
- Liphistius langkawi Platnick & Sedgwick, 1984 – Malaysia
- Liphistius lannaianus Schwendinger, 1990 – Thailand
- Liphistius lansak Sivayyapram & Warrit, 2024 — Thailand
- Liphistius laoticus Schwendinger, 2013 – Laos
- Liphistius laruticus Schwendinger, 1997 – Malaysia
- Liphistius linang Schwendinger, 2017 – Malaysia
- Liphistius liz Lin & Li, 2023 — China
- Liphistius lordae Platnick & Sedgwick, 1984 – Myanmar
- Liphistius maewongensis Sivayyapram, Smith, Weingdow & Warrit, 2017 – Thailand
- Liphistius malayanus Abraham, 1923 – Malaysia
- Liphistius marginatus Schwendinger, 1990 – Thailand
- Liphistius metopiae Schwendinger, 2022 – Thailand
- Liphistius murphyorum Platnick & Sedgwick, 1984 – Malaysia
- Liphistius nabang Yu, F. Zhang & J. X. Zhang, 2021 – China
- Liphistius nawngau Zhan & Xu, 2024 — Myanmar
- Liphistius negara Schwendinger, 2017 – Malaysia
- Liphistius nesioticus Schwendinger, 1996 – Thailand
- Liphistius niphanae Ono, 1988 – Thailand
- Liphistius ochraceus Ono & Schwendinger, 1990 – Thailand
- Liphistius onoi Schwendinger, 1996 – Thailand
- Liphistius ornatus Ono & Schwendinger, 1990 – Thailand
- Liphistius owadai Ono & Schwendinger, 1990 – Thailand
- Liphistius panching Platnick & Sedgwick, 1984 – Malaysia
- Liphistius phileion Schwendinger, 1998 – Thailand
- Liphistius phuketensis Schwendinger, 1998 – Thailand
- Liphistius pilok Tanikawa & Petcharad, 2023 — Thailand
- Liphistius pinlaung Aung, Xu, Lwin, Sang, Yu, H. Liu, F. X. Liu & Li, 2019 – Myanmar
- Liphistius platnicki (Schwendinger & Huber, 2022) – Myanmar
- Liphistius priceae Schwendinger, 2017 – Malaysia
- Liphistius pusohm Schwendinger, 1996 – Thailand
- Liphistius pyinoolwin Xu, Yu, Aung, Yu, Liu, Lwin, Sang & Li, 2021 – Myanmar
- Liphistius rostratus Zhan & Xu, 2024 — Myanmar
- Liphistius sayam Schwendinger, 1998 – Thailand
- Liphistius schwendingeri Ono, 1988 – Thailand
- Liphistius sumatranus Thorell, 1890 – Indonesia (Sumatra)
- Liphistius suwat Schwendinger, 1996 – Thailand
- Liphistius tanakai Ono & Aung, 2020 – Myanmar
- Liphistius tempurung Platnick, 1997 – Malaysia
- Liphistius tenuis Schwendinger, 1996 – Thailand
- Liphistius thaleri Schwendinger, 2009 – Thailand
- Liphistius tham Sedgwick & Schwendinger, 1990 – Thailand
- Liphistius thoranie Schwendinger, 1996 – Thailand
- Liphistius tioman Platnick & Sedgwick, 1984 – Malaysia
- Liphistius trang Platnick & Sedgwick, 1984 – Thailand
- Liphistius tung Schwendinger, 2022 – Myanmar
- Liphistius yamasakii Ono, 1988 – Thailand
- Liphistius yangae Platnick & Sedgwick, 1984 – Thailand, Malaysia

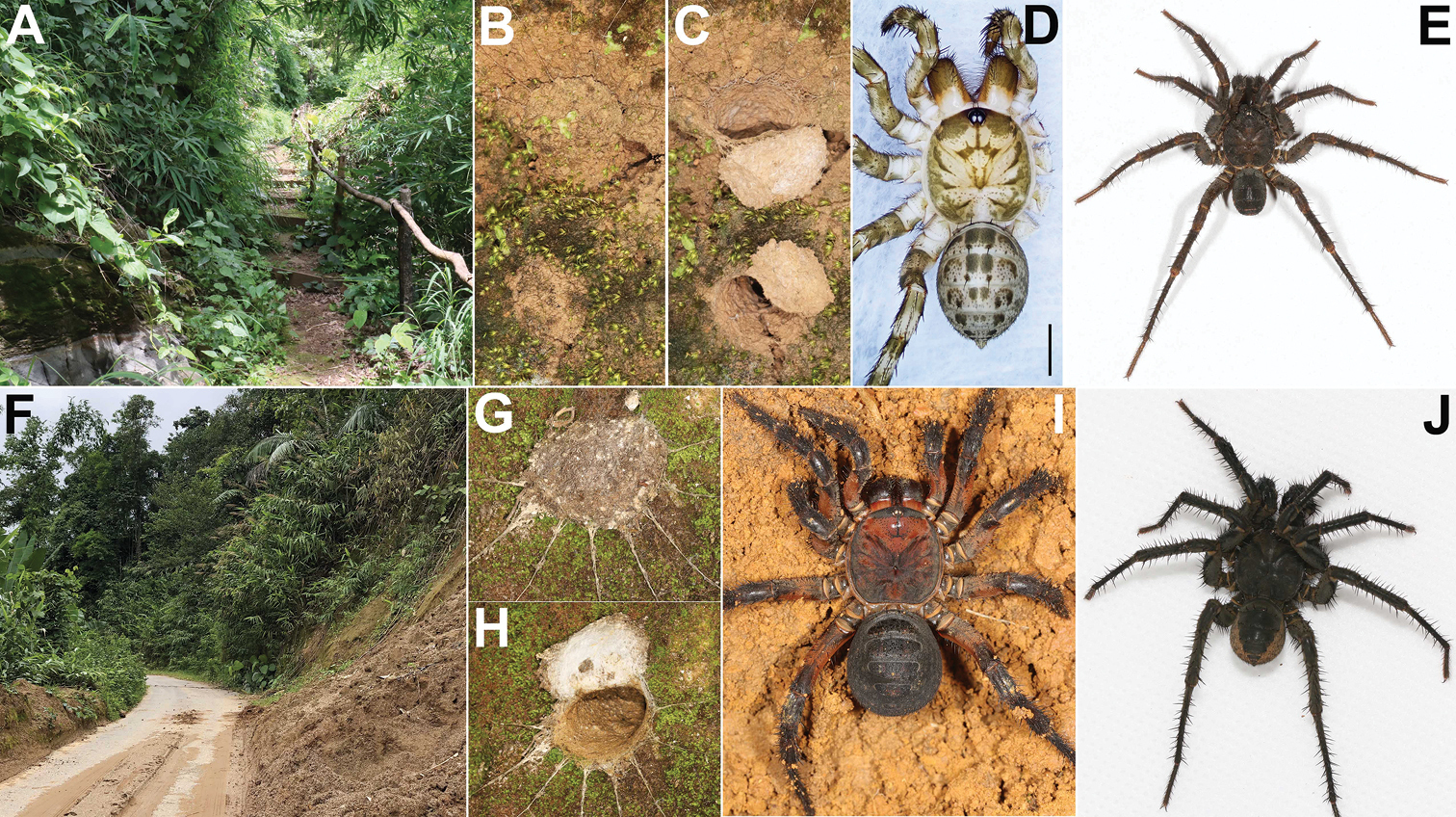
Liphistius pyinoolwin: A – microhabitat, B – a burrow with two trapdoors closed, C – same with trapdoors opened, D – female, E – male; Liphistius birmanicus: F – microhabitat, G – burrow with trapdoor closed, H – same with trapdoor opened, I – female, J – male; scale bar: 2 mm (D)

== Threatened Malaysian species ==
Three of the Liphistius species known to exist in Malaysia are endemic to only one or two caves. The most well known is Liphistius batuensis, which is found in Batu Caves. It is endangered, with a population of under 250 individuals. Other species found in Malaysia include Liphistius malayanus, Liphistius murphyorum and Liphistius desultor. The Malaysian trapdoor spiders are protected by local law, though continuous threats come from loss of habitat and collection by exotic pet traders.
