= Ganthela wangjiangensis =

Scientific classification
- Kingdom: Animalia
- Phylum: Arthropoda
- Subphylum: Chelicerata
- Class: Arachnida
- Order: Araneae
- Suborder: Mesothelae
- Family: Liphistiidae
- Subfamily: Heptathelinae
- Genus: Ganthela
- Species: G. wangjiangensis

Binomial name
- Ganthela wangjiangensis Xu, Kuntner & Liu, 2015

Species of spider

Ganthela wangjiangensis is a species of spider belonging to the family Liphistiidae. It is native to China. The species name refers to the type locality of this species which is Mount Wangjiang in Fujian.

The body length is 11.5 mm (0.45 in) for the holotype, a female. Males are unknown.
