= Ganthela venus =

Scientific classification
- Kingdom: Animalia
- Phylum: Arthropoda
- Subphylum: Chelicerata
- Class: Arachnida
- Order: Araneae
- Suborder: Mesothelae
- Family: Liphistiidae
- Subfamily: Heptathelinae
- Genus: Ganthela
- Species: G. venus

Binomial name
- Ganthela venus Xu, 2015

Species of spider

Ganthela venus is a species of spider belonging to the subfamily Heptathelinae of the family Liphistiidae.
