= Liphistius murphyorum =

Scientific classification
- Kingdom: Animalia
- Phylum: Arthropoda
- Subphylum: Chelicerata
- Class: Arachnida
- Order: Araneae
- Suborder: Mesothelae
- Family: Liphistiidae
- Genus: Liphistius
- Species: L. murphyorum

Binomial name
- Liphistius murphyorum Platnick & Sedgwick, 1984

Species of trapdoor spider

Liphistius murphyorum is a species of trapdoor spider that is native to Malaysia.

It is commonly misidentified as Liphistius desultory, another trapdoor spider species.
