= Liphistius bristowei =

Scientific classification
- Kingdom: Animalia
- Phylum: Arthropoda
- Subphylum: Chelicerata
- Class: Arachnida
- Order: Araneae
- Suborder: Mesothelae
- Family: Liphistiidae
- Genus: Liphistius
- Species: L. bristowei

Binomial name
- Liphistius bristowei Platnick & Sedgwick, 1984

Species of trapdoor spider

Liphistius bristowei is a species of trapdoor spider native to Thailand.
