= Liphistius choosaki =

Scientific classification
- Kingdom: Animalia
- Phylum: Arthropoda
- Subphylum: Chelicerata
- Class: Arachnida
- Order: Araneae
- Suborder: Mesothelae
- Family: Liphistiidae
- Genus: Liphistius
- Species: L. choosaki

Binomial name
- Liphistius choosaki Sivayyapram & Warrit

Species of trapdoor spider

Liphistius choosaki is a species of trapdoor spider that is native to Thailand. The species name honors Mr. Choosak Pungrusmee, father of Mr. Sarawut Pungrusmee who is a dedicated philanthropist to the research of biodiversity.

The carapace of this species is uniformly brown with areas of darker brown and orange.
