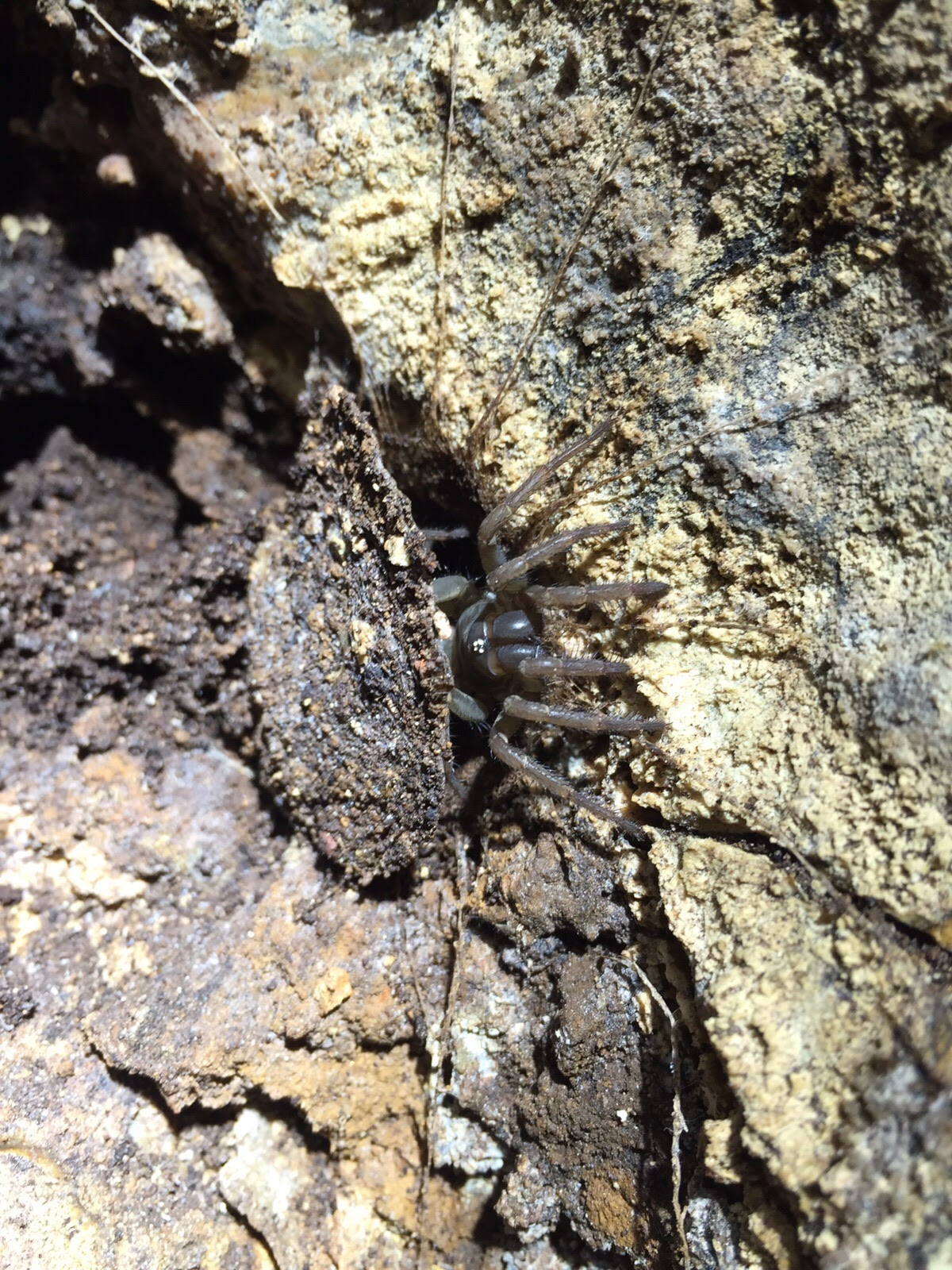
- Liphistius batuensis, behind its trapdoor, its legs feel for vibrations on the trip-lines that radiate out from its tubular nest. Sensing a vibration could mean food or foe.

Scientific classification
- Kingdom: Animalia
- Phylum: Arthropoda
- Subphylum: Chelicerata
- Class: Arachnida
- Order: Araneae
- Suborder: Mesothelae
- Family: Liphistiidae
- Genus: Liphistius
- Species: L. batuensis

Binomial name
- Liphistius batuensis Abraham, 1923

= Liphistius batuensis =

Species of trapdoor spider found in Selangor, Malaysia

Liphistius batuensis, the Batus Caves trapdoor spider is a species of trapdoor spider from Malaysia. It is thought to be restricted to the Batu Caves and a cave in Templer Park, near Kuala Lumpur. It was first collected by H. C. Abraham in 1923, and has been described as a living fossil.

Adults build a nest about 40–50 mm (1.6–2.0 in) long with an opening some 22 mm (0.9 in) wide, from which six to 10 strands of silk radiate out 12.5–15 cm (5–6 in) in a semicircle. The movement of an insect against these threads is detected by the spider, which then rushes out and captures the insect. Spiderlings build smaller nests, only 10 mm (0.39 in) across, and seem to abandon these during development to build a bigger nest; intermediate sizes of nests are not seen.

Spiders of all ages may fall prey to cave-dwelling centipedes.
