= Liphistius dawei =

Scientific classification
- Kingdom: Animalia
- Phylum: Arthropoda
- Subphylum: Chelicerata
- Class: Arachnida
- Order: Araneae
- Suborder: Mesothelae
- Family: Liphistiidae
- Genus: Liphistius
- Species: L. dawei

Binomial name
- Liphistius dawei Sivayyapram & Warrit, 2024

Species of trapdoor spider

Liphistius dawei is a species of trapdoor spider native to Myanmar. The species name refers to the type locality of this species which is the Dawei State of Myanmar.

Males have a carapace that is uniformly brown with black stripe along the margins. The chelicerae are a pale color while the palp and legs are more of a pale brown color.
