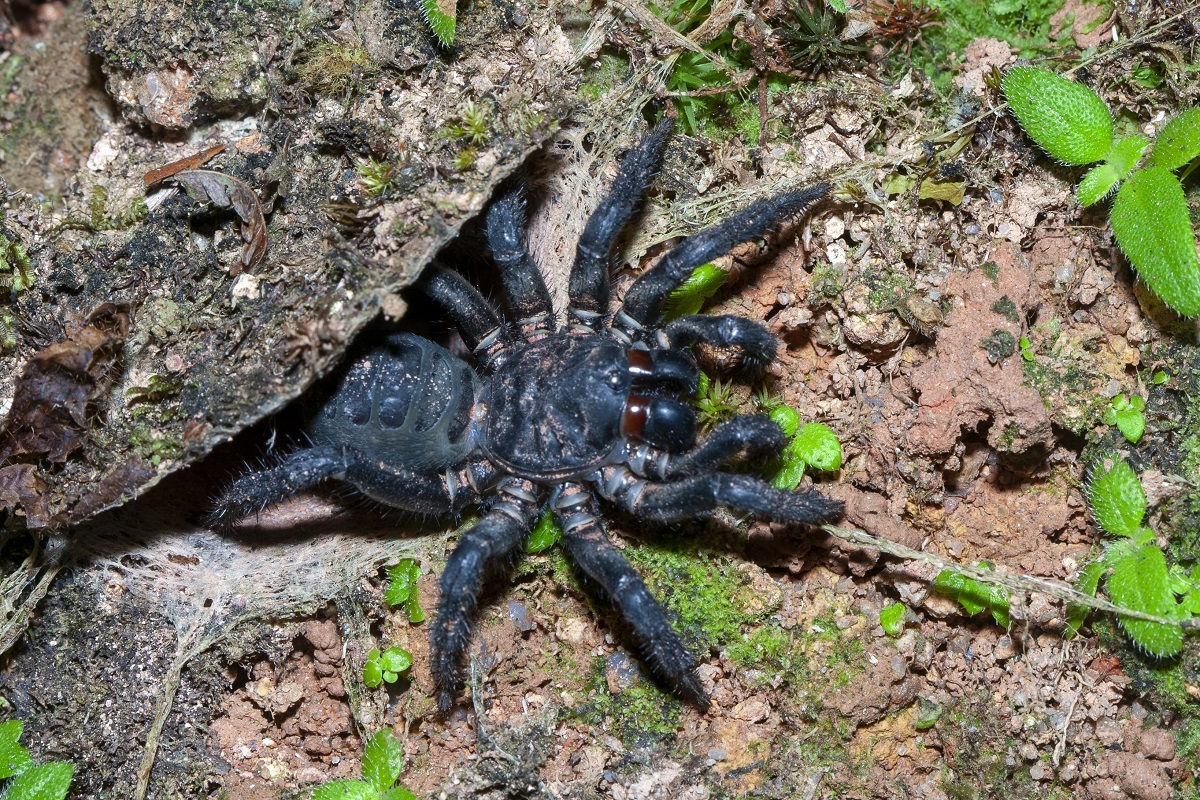
- Liphistius malayanus near one of its burrows
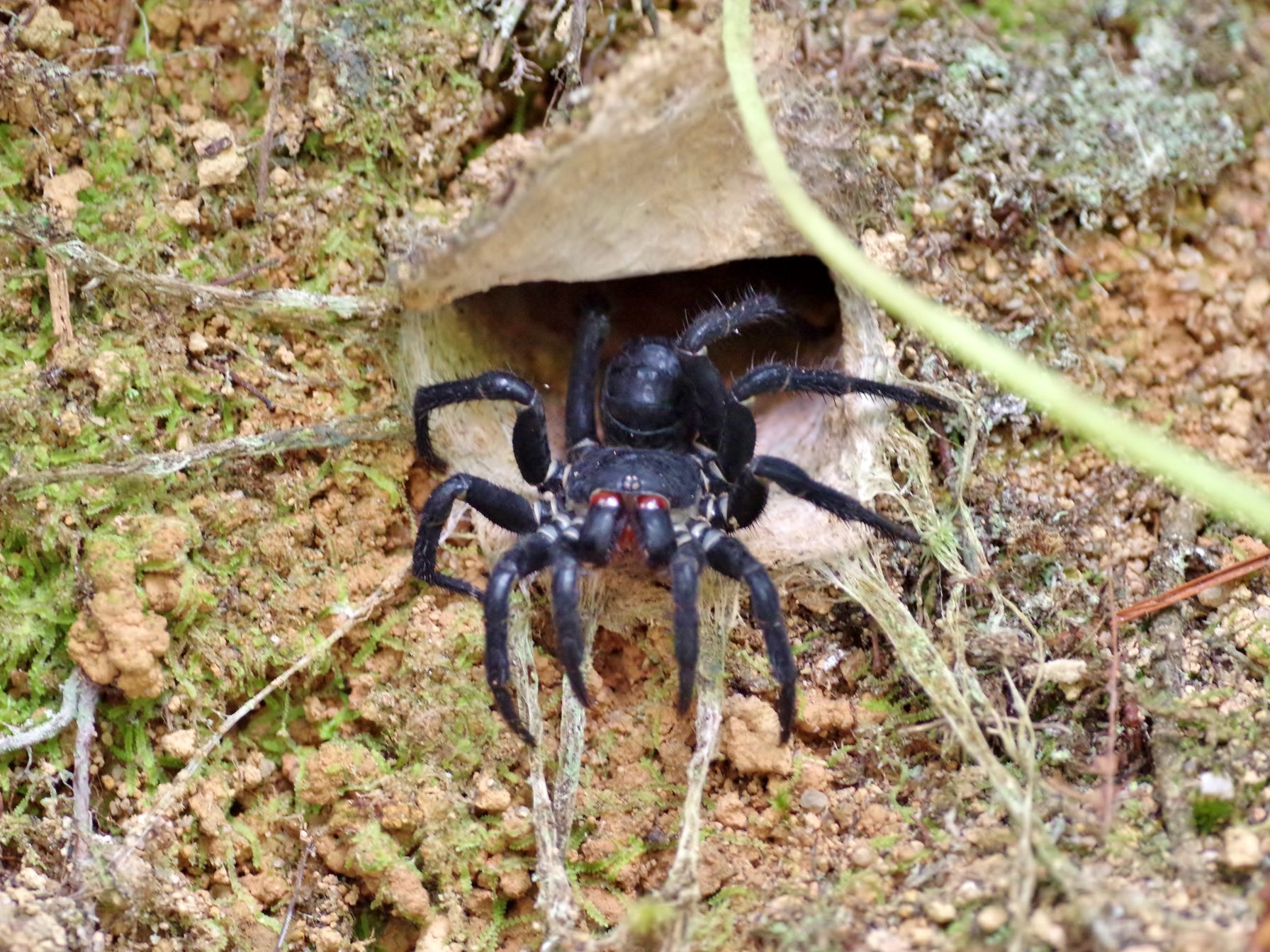
- Image of Liphistius malayanus in its burrow

Scientific classification
- Kingdom: Animalia
- Phylum: Arthropoda
- Subphylum: Chelicerata
- Class: Arachnida
- Order: Araneae
- Suborder: Mesothelae
- Family: Liphistiidae
- Genus: Liphistius
- Species: L. malayanus

Binomial name
- Liphistius malayanus Abraham, 1923

= Liphistius malayanus =

Species of trap-door spider

Liphistius malayanus, also known as the Malayan black trapdoor spider or the black armored trapdoor spider, is a species of trapdoor spider that is native to Malaysia.

The burrows they create are covered by a thin, circular woven door which is hidden with dirt and moss. The trapdoors of females were up to 3.8 cm long and 6.5 cm wide. The longest burrow created by Liphistius malayanus was 20 cm long. They hide deep in their burrow during the day. At night, they wait for prey such as insects, woodlice and other similar animals to wander near where it will catch them.

== Description ==
This is a large species of trapdoor spider with both sexes have a black or dark brown color. Some red can be seen.

== Habitat ==
This species is native to Malaysia, specifically the main range of the Malay peninsula. They can be found in soil on exposed sides of roads and trails inside and outside forests but never very far from forests, sides of erosion gullies, sloping forest floor, and in decomposing wood of logs.
