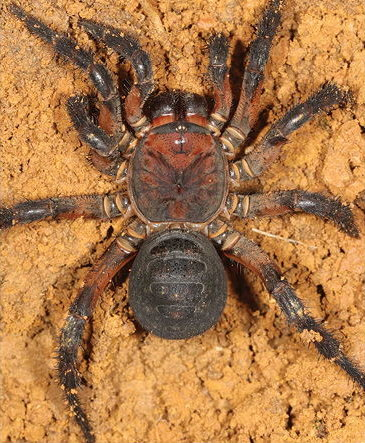
- Female

Scientific classification
- Kingdom: Animalia
- Phylum: Arthropoda
- Subphylum: Chelicerata
- Class: Arachnida
- Order: Araneae
- Suborder: Mesothelae
- Family: Liphistiidae
- Genus: Liphistius
- Species: L. birmanicus

Binomial name
- Liphistius birmanicus Thorell, 1897

= Liphistius birmanicus =

Trapdoor spider

Liphistius birmanicus is a species of trapdoor spider that is native to Myanmar.

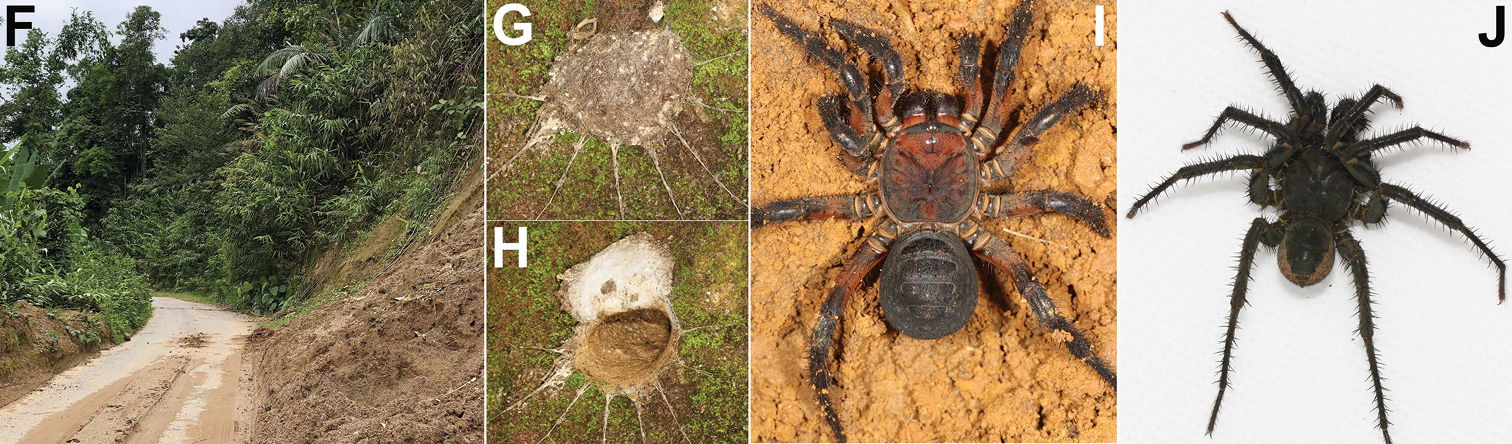
Various images associated with Liphistius birmanicus: (F) microhabitat where it lives, (G) burrow with the lid closed, (H) the same burrow with the door open, (I) female, and (J) male
