= Liphistius albipes =

Scientific classification
- Kingdom: Animalia
- Phylum: Arthropoda
- Subphylum: Chelicerata
- Class: Arachnida
- Order: Araneae
- Suborder: Mesothelae
- Family: Liphistiidae
- Genus: Liphistius
- Species: L. albipes

Binomial name
- Liphistius albipes Schwendinger, 1995

Species of trapdoor spider

Liphistius albipes is a species of trapdoor spider that is native to Thailand.
