= Liphistius kalaw =

Scientific classification
- Kingdom: Animalia
- Phylum: Arthropoda
- Subphylum: Chelicerata
- Class: Arachnida
- Order: Araneae
- Suborder: Mesothelae
- Family: Liphistiidae
- Genus: Liphistius
- Species: L. kalaw

Binomial name
- Liphistius kalaw Zhan & Xu, 2024

Species of trapdoor spider

Liphistius kalaw is a species of trapdoor spider that is native to Myanmar.

Males have a robust body with an overall yellowish-brown color. Their bristle hairs are short and scattered. Females also have a yellowish-brown body with short scattered bristle hairs however they have some reddish-brown coloration.
