= Liphistius yamasakii =

Scientific classification
- Kingdom: Animalia
- Phylum: Arthropoda
- Subphylum: Chelicerata
- Class: Arachnida
- Order: Araneae
- Suborder: Mesothelae
- Family: Liphistiidae
- Genus: Liphistius
- Species: L. yamasakii

Binomial name
- Liphistius yamasakii Ono, 1988

Species of trapdoor spider

Liphistius yamasakii is a species of trapdoor spider that is native to Thailand.
