= Liphistius buran =

Scientific classification
- Kingdom: Animalia
- Phylum: Arthropoda
- Subphylum: Chelicerata
- Class: Arachnida
- Order: Araneae
- Suborder: Mesothelae
- Family: Liphistiidae
- Genus: Liphistius
- Species: L. buran

Binomial name
- Liphistius buran Schwendinger, 2019

Species of trapdoor spider

Liphistius buran is a species of trapdoor spider that is native only to Pangkor island, Malaysia. They are found on sloping earth banks along old logging roads in dense rainforest.

While most have only one trapdoor, a few had two trapdoors.
