= Liphistius erawan =

Scientific classification
- Kingdom: Animalia
- Phylum: Arthropoda
- Subphylum: Chelicerata
- Class: Arachnida
- Order: Araneae
- Suborder: Mesothelae
- Family: Liphistiidae
- Genus: Liphistius
- Species: L. erawan

Binomial name
- Liphistius erawan Schwendinger, 1996

Species of spider

Liphistius erawan is a rare species of spider that has only been observed in the Erawan National Park in Thailand.
