= Ganthela jianensis =

Scientific classification
- Kingdom: Animalia
- Phylum: Arthropoda
- Subphylum: Chelicerata
- Class: Arachnida
- Order: Araneae
- Suborder: Mesothelae
- Family: Liphistiidae
- Subfamily: Heptathelinae
- Genus: Ganthela
- Species: G. jianensis

Binomial name
- Ganthela jianensis Xu, Kuntner & Chen, 2015

Species of spider

Ganthela jianensis is a species of spider that is native to China.
