= Ganthela yundingensis =

Scientific classification
- Kingdom: Animalia
- Phylum: Arthropoda
- Subphylum: Chelicerata
- Class: Arachnida
- Order: Araneae
- Suborder: Mesothelae
- Family: Liphistiidae
- Subfamily: Heptathelinae
- Genus: Ganthela
- Species: G. yundingensis

Binomial name
- Ganthela yundingensis Xu, 2015

Species of spider

Ganthela yundingensis is a species of spider belonging to the subfamily Heptathelinae of the family Liphistiidae that is native to China. It is the type species of genus Ganthela.

They can reach lengths of up to 8-15 centimeters long excluding chelicerae. Their carapace and opisthosoma are light brown with the tergites being dark brown.
