= British Arachnological Society =

British society dedicated to study of arachnids

The British Arachnological Society (BAS) is the UK’s first body devoted exclusively to the study of arachnids. The primary objectives of the Society are to encourage interest in arachnology in people of all ages and to generate, promote and disseminate arachnological knowledge and understanding by all suitable means. In particular, it works to foster co-operation between amateur and professional arachnologists.

Actively involved in scientific aspects of arachnid conservation, it provides impartial information and expert advice on the ecology and biology of British arachnids to policy and decision makers in Government and non-governmental organisations (NGOs), as well as to conservation practitioners, private interests and the public. The Society oversees national recording schemes for spiders, harvestmen and pseudoscorpions.

Founded in 1958, it is one of the oldest societies specializing in this animal group, publishing a journal (Arachnology) and a Newsletter three times a year. Membership is both British and international. The BAS is a registered charity in England and Wales (Charity No. 260346) and in Scotland (Charity No. SC044090)

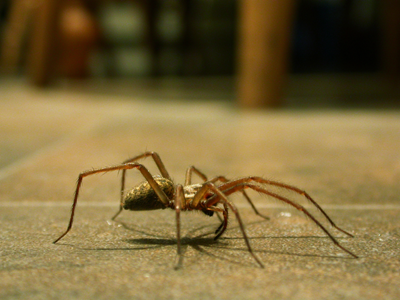
Large house spider (Tegenaria saeva) on a kitchen floor

== History ==
The society originated in the 1950s, when it was suggested to the British arachnologists G. H. (Ted) Locket and A. F. (Frank) Millidge that they should run a spider identification course. Courses were run at Flatford Mill in Suffolk in 1956 by Locket, in 1957 by David Blest and 1958 again by Locket. 1958 was also an important year for British arachnology with the publication of the celebrated The World of Spiders by W. S. Bristowe.

=== The Flatford Mill Spider Group ===
During the 1958 spider course, discussions led to the formation of the Flatford Mill Spider Group — the direct forerunner of the BAS — with Ted Locket as Chairman and David Mackie as its Secretary and Treasurer. Mackie also edited a Bulletin, which was first produced in 1959. The group's aim was to exchange information between workers, and initial membership comprised ten people with subscriptions in 1959 of five shillings (25p). Further field courses were held in subsequent years at Flatford and at Malham in Yorkshire, led by arachnologists such as Doug Clark, John Cooke, Eric Duffey and Ted Locket.

=== The British Spider Study Group ===
The name 'Flatford Mill Spider Group' was eventually considered too parochial and at the 1963 meeting in Preston Montford the name of the association was changed, and from 1964 it became the British Spider Study Group. Membership at this stage was 35 and again Ted Locket was the Chairman and David Mackie the Secretary and Treasurer. The reprint library was also founded at about this time and regular field courses training up a new generation of arachnologists continued. The Bulletin of the British Spider Study Group continued to grow in size and importance.

=== The British Arachnological Society ===
At the 1968 meeting in Monks Wood a decision was made to rename the society again, which from 1969 became known as the British Arachnological Society. A formal constitution was adopted, Eric Duffey became its first President and David Mackie continued as Secretary and Treasurer before handing over to John Parker. The first Bulletin of the British Arachnological Society was published, now with an improved production quality, with John Crocker as editor; who also designed the society logo showing a crab spider. A separate Newsletter was produced from 1971 (and issued together with volume 2 of the Bulletin), edited by John Parker. In subsequent years the society increased in size and the quality of its publications also improved. A 50th anniversary meeting was held, again at Preston Montford, in 2008.

== The Society ==
The primary aims of the Society are to encourage interest in arachnology in people of all ages and to generate, promote and disseminate arachnological knowledge and understanding by all suitable means. In particular, it works to foster co-operation between amateur and professional arachnologists. It maintains an extensive library of books, monographs and reprints (many as pdf files), which can be made available to members upon request.

The society is headed by a council comprising a President, Vice-President, Secretary, Meetings Secretary, Treasurer and Membership Development Officer. Other council posts include: Librarian, Editors of both Arachnology and the Newsletter, Distribution Manager, Sales Manager, Conservation Officer, Education & Publicity Officer, Web Master, and the Organisers of the respective Spider, Harvestman and Pseudoscorpion Recording Schemes, as well as additional ordinary council members.

The society currently has a series of subcommittees drawn from council, whose focus is on strategy, conservation and education & publicity.

=== Publications ===
The BAS produces two regular publications, distributed together three times a year.

==== Arachnology ====
Arachnology [formerly the Bulletin of the British Arachnological Society] is a peer-reviewed academic journal, publishing research papers on all aspects of arachnid biology, excluding mites. As of 2010, fifteen volumes have been published, with each volume spread over a number of years. Initially edited by John Crocker (1970–1973), and then Eric Duffey (1974) the Bulletin was edited for many years (1974–2011) by Peter Merrett. From mid-2011 editorship was taken over by Paul Selden.

==== Newsletter ====
The Newsletter of the British Arachnological Society is a more informal publication, including observations on arachnids and other short papers of academic interest, reports of meetings, obituaries, historical notes and book reviews, etc. Running to 162 volumes as of 2025, it was originally edited by arachnologists John Parker (issues 1–50), John Dalingwater (issues 51–100), Richard Gallon (issues 101–152) and Danniella Sherwood (issues 153-161). Since issue 162 it is now edited by a team of voluntary BAS members. It formerly included the Spider Recording Scheme News, a supplement (edited formerly by Peter Harvey and then Richard Gallon) largely devoted to the occurrence, distribution and autecology of spiders and other arachnids within the British Isles; including rare or difficult to identify species.

=== Other publications ===
As well as a Members' Handbook supplied free to all members, the BAS has also published a number of occasional edited volumes, devoted to special topics: the proceedings of the European Congress of arachnology in Edinburgh and a memorial volume for the scorpion biologist Gary Allan Polis. It has also published two important books: a Provisional Atlas of the British Spiders and a guide to the Gnaphosid Genera of the World. It was also partially involved in the publication of Paulo Marcello Brignoli's spider catalogue, early issues of the successor catalogue by Norman Platnick and the pseudoscorpion catalogue of Mark Harvey.

=== Meetings ===
The BAS holds an annual general meeting (AGM and Field Meeting), usually at a field station somewhere in the UK. As well as society business, the meeting invariably includes a field trip to collect spiders and other arachnids in the local area; with a report of the meeting — and the animals collected — published in the Newsletter.

The BAS has hosted an International arachnological meeting (Exeter in 1977, together with the Zoological Society of London) and a European arachnological meeting (Edinburgh in 1997).

The BAS is also associated with regular spider identification courses run by the Field Studies Council. Increasingly, regional meeting and identification workshops are being organised.

=== Spider Recording Scheme ===
Another key activity of the society is the Spider Recording Scheme (SRS). The older literature included early distribution maps showing the vice-counties from which spiders had been recorded. In 1987 Clifford Smith became the first National Organiser of the spider recording scheme, collating records of British spiders largely contributed by BAS members. From 1993 to 1999 this role was taken over by David Nellist and from 1999 by Peter Harvey, and now by Richard Gallon. This work first led to the publication of the Provisional Atlas of British Spiders in 2002 by the Biological Records Centre, then updated maps in 2006 and the development of the Spider Recording Scheme website in 2010. The British Arachnological Society Atlas was released in January 2026 and maps the distribution of all British spider, harvestmen and pseudoscorpion species. A checklist of British arachnids linked directly to distribution maps can be found on the BAS website.

=== Harvestman and Pseudoscorpion Recording Schemes ===
The Harvestman Recording Scheme provides information on seasonality and habitats as well as distribution maps, and can be accessed on the SRS website. For pseudoscorpions, a Pseudoscorpion Recorders Group collects similar information.

== Bibliography ==
Merrett, P. 2009. History of the British Arachnological Society and arachnology in Britain. Newsletter of the British Arachnological Society, 114: 1-3.

Merrett, P. 2009. History of the British Arachnological Society and arachnology in Britain. Part 2. Newsletter of the British Arachnological Society, 115: 1-4.
