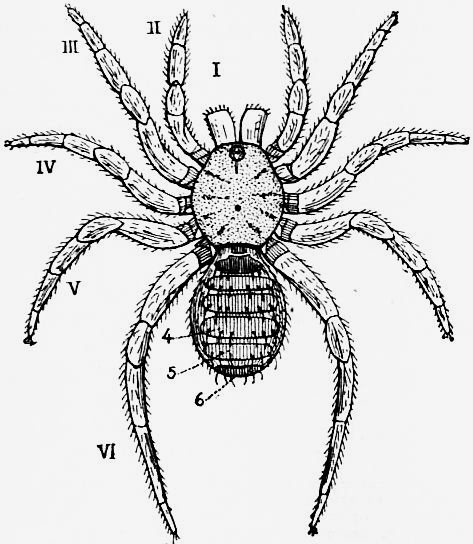
- Liphistius desultor from Encyclopædia Britannica in 1911

Scientific classification
- Kingdom: Animalia
- Phylum: Arthropoda
- Subphylum: Chelicerata
- Class: Arachnida
- Order: Araneae
- Suborder: Mesothelae
- Family: Liphistiidae
- Genus: Liphistius
- Species: L. desultor

Binomial name
- Liphistius desultor Schiodte, 1849

= Liphistius desultor =

Species of trapdoor spider

Liphistius desultor is a species of trapdoor spider native to Malaysia. It is a large species of spider similar to Liphistius yangae.

It is the type species of its genus.
