= Amaurobius strandi =

Scientific classification
- Domain: Eukaryota
- Kingdom: Animalia
- Phylum: Arthropoda
- Subphylum: Chelicerata
- Class: Arachnida
- Order: Araneae
- Infraorder: Araneomorphae
- Family: Amaurobiidae
- Genus: Amaurobius
- Species: A. strandi

Binomial name
- Amaurobius strandi Charitonov, 1937

Synonyms
- Amaurobius pallidus strandi Charitonov, 1937; Amaurobius timidus Thaler & Knoflach, 1995; Amaurobius strandi Kovblyuk, 2002

Species of spider

Amaurobius strandi is a species of spider in the family Amaurobiidae, found in Greece, Bulgaria and Ukraine. It was first described in 1937 by Dmitry Kharitonov, as A. pallidus strandi, and elevated to a full species by Kovblyuk in 2002.
