= A. heathi =

A. heathi may refer to:

- Amaurobius heathi, a spider species found in the United States of America
- Amphisbaena heathi, a worm lizard species found in Brazil

== See also ==
- Heathi (disambiguation)
