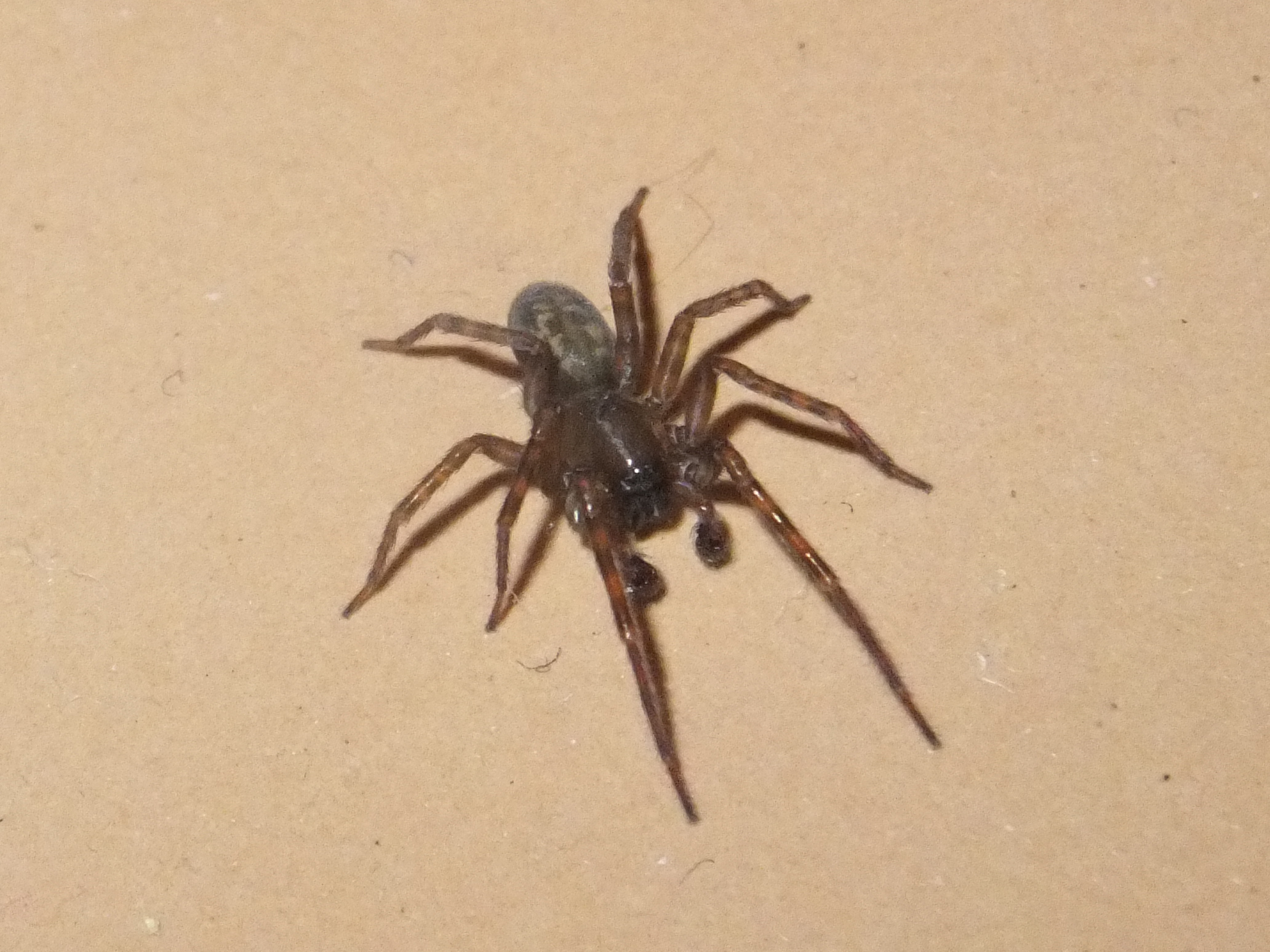

Scientific classification
- Kingdom: Animalia
- Phylum: Arthropoda
- Subphylum: Chelicerata
- Class: Arachnida
- Order: Araneae
- Infraorder: Araneomorphae
- Family: Amaurobiidae
- Genus: Amaurobius
- Species: A. erberi

Binomial name
- Amaurobius erberi (Keyserling, 1863)

Synonyms
- Ciniflo erberii; Amaurobius cyrilli; Ciniflo erberi; Amaurobius provisorius

= Amaurobius erberi =

Species of spider

Amaurobius erberi is a species of spider in the family Amaurobiidae, found in Europe and the Canary Islands.

A. erberi is very similar to A. similis and A. fenestralis in general appearance. The epigyne is separated from that of A. fenestralis by the outlines of the spermathecaa which extend well ahead of the anterior margin. The male palps are similar to that of A. similus but, from above, the thin apophysis is longer. The males are mature in autumn and the females are probably mature throughout the year. It is generally found under stones and logs and in leaf litter.
