= Lace webbed spider =

Lace webbed spider, lace-webbed spider or lace-web spider may refer to:

- Amaurobius fenestralis, a species of spider found from Europe to Central Asia
- Amaurobius similis, a species of spider widespread in the Northern Hemisphere
- spiders of the family Desidae, otherwise known as intertidal spiders
