= Matriphagy =

Consumption of a mother by her offspring

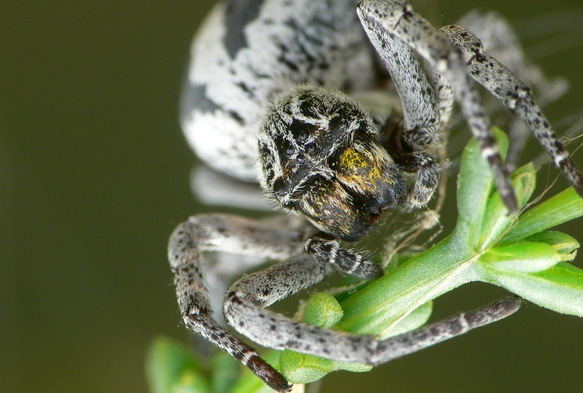
Desert spider, Stegodyphus lineatus, one of the best-described species that participates in matriphagy

Matriphagy is the consumption of the mother by her offspring. The behavior generally takes place within the first few weeks of life and has been documented in some species of insects, nematode worms, pseudoscorpions, and other arachnids as well as in caecilian amphibians.

The specifics of how matriphagy occurs varies among different species. However, the process is best-described in the desert spider (Stegodyphus lineatus), where the mother harbors nutritional resources for her young through food consumption. The mother can regurgitate small portions of food for her growing offspring, but between 1–2 weeks after hatching, the progeny capitalize on this food source by eating her alive. Typically, offspring only feed on their biological mother as opposed to other females in the population. In other arachnid species, matriphagy occurs after the ingestion of nutritional eggs known as trophic eggs (e.g. Black lace-weaver Amaurobius ferox, crab spider Australomisidia ergandros). It involves different techniques for killing the mother, such as transfer of poison via biting and sucking to cause a quick death (e.g. Black lace-weaver) or continuous sucking of the hemolymph, resulting in a more gradual death (e.g. Crab spider). The behavior is less well described but follows a similar pattern in species such as the Hump earwig, pseudoscorpions, and caecilians.

Spiders that engage in matriphagy produce offspring with higher weights, shorter and earlier moulting time, larger body mass at dispersal, and higher survival rates than clutches deprived of matriphagy. In some species, matriphagous offspring were also more successful at capturing large prey items and had a higher survival rate at dispersal. These benefits to offspring outweigh the cost of survival to the mothers and help ensure that her genetic traits are passed to the next generation, thus perpetuating the behavior.

Overall, matriphagy is an extreme form of parental care but is highly related to extended care in the funnel-web spider, parental investment in caecilians, and gerontophagy in social spiders. The uniqueness of this phenomenon has led to several expanded analogies in human culture and contributed to the pervasive fear of spiders throughout society.

== Etymology ==
Matriphagy can be broken down into two components:

- matri- (mother)
- -phagy (to feed on)

== Description of behavior ==
Matriphagy generally consists of offspring consuming their mother; however, different species exhibit different variations of this behavior.

=== Spiders ===
==== Black lace-weaver: Amaurobius ferox ====
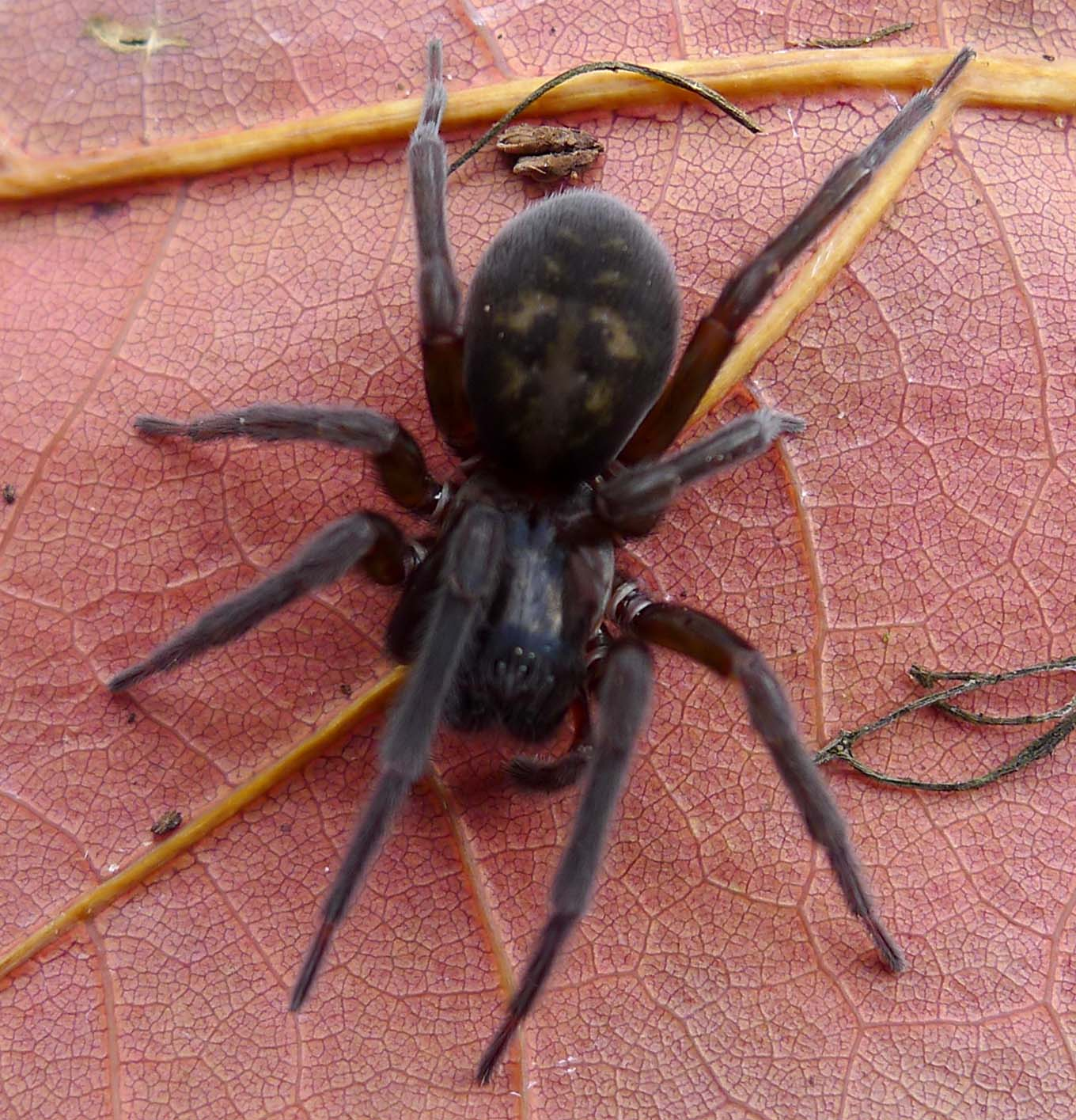
This black lace-weaver (Amaurobius ferox) female adult will eventually be consumed by her offspring.

In many black lace-weavers, Amaurobius ferox, offspring do not immediately consume their mother. A day after offspring emerge from their eggs, their mother lays a set of trophic eggs, which contain nutrition for the offspring to consume. Matriphagy commences days later when the mother begins communicating with her offspring through web vibrations, drumming, and jumping. Through these behaviors, offspring are able to detect when and where they can consume their mother. They migrate towards her and a couple of the spiderlings jump onto her back to consume her. In response, the mother jumps and drums more frequently to keep her offspring off of her, however, they relentlessly continue attempting to get onto her back. When the mother feels ready, she presses her body onto her offspring and allows them to consume her via sucking on her insides. As they consume her, they also release poison into her body, causing a quick death. The mother's body is kept for a few weeks as a nutritional reserve.

Matriphagy in this species is dependent on the developmental stage that the offspring are currently at. If offspring, older than four days, are given to an unrelated mother, they refuse to consume her. However, if younger offspring are given to an unrelated mother, they readily consume her. Additionally, if a mother loses her offspring, she is able to produce another clutch of offspring.

==== Crab spider: Australomisidia ergandros ====
Mothers of one particular Australian species of the crab spider, Australomisidia ergandros (formerly in genus Diaea), are only able to lay one clutch, unlike the black lace-weaver. They invest a significant amount of time and energy into storing nutrients and food into large oocytes, known as trophic eggs, similar to the black lace-weaver. However, these trophic eggs are too large to physically leave her body. Some of the nutrients from the trophic eggs are liquefied into haemolymph, which can be consumed through the mother's leg joints by her offspring. She gradually shrinks until she becomes immobile and dies.

In this species, it has been shown that this behavior may contribute to reducing cannibalism by siblings.

==== Desert Spider: Stegodyphus lineatus ====
Right after hatching, the hatchlings of the desert spider Stegodyphus lineatus rely solely upon their mother to provide them with food and nutrients. Their mother does this by regurgitating her bodily fluids, which contain a mixture of nutrients for them to feed on.

This behavior begins during mating. Mating causes an increase in the mother's production of digestive enzymes to better digest her prey. Consequently, she is able to retain more nutrients for her offspring to consume later. The mother's midgut tissues start to slowly degrade during the incubation period of her eggs. After her offspring hatch, she regurgitates food for them to feed on with the help of her already-liquefied midgut tissues. Meanwhile, her midgut tissues continue to degrade into a liquid state to maximize the amount of nutrients from the mother's body that her offspring will be able to obtain. As degradation continues, nutritional vacuoles form within her abdomen to amass all of the nutrients. Consumption begins when her offspring puncture her abdomen to suck up the nutritional vacuoles. After approximately 2–3 hours, the mother's bodily fluids are completely consumed, and only her exoskeleton remains.

This species is only able to have one clutch, which might explain why so much time and energy is spent on taking care of offspring. Furthermore, matriphagy can also occur between offspring and mothers who have recently laid eggs that are not related.

=== Hump earwig ===
==== Anechura harmandi ====
Anechura harmandi is the only species of earwigs that has been currently documented to exhibit matriphagy. Mothers in this particular species of earwigs have been found to reproduce during colder temperatures. This is mainly for the purpose of avoiding predation and maximizing their offspring's survival, since females are unable to produce a second clutch. Due to the cold temperature, there is a scarcity of available nutrients when the offspring hatch, which is why the offspring end up consuming their mother.

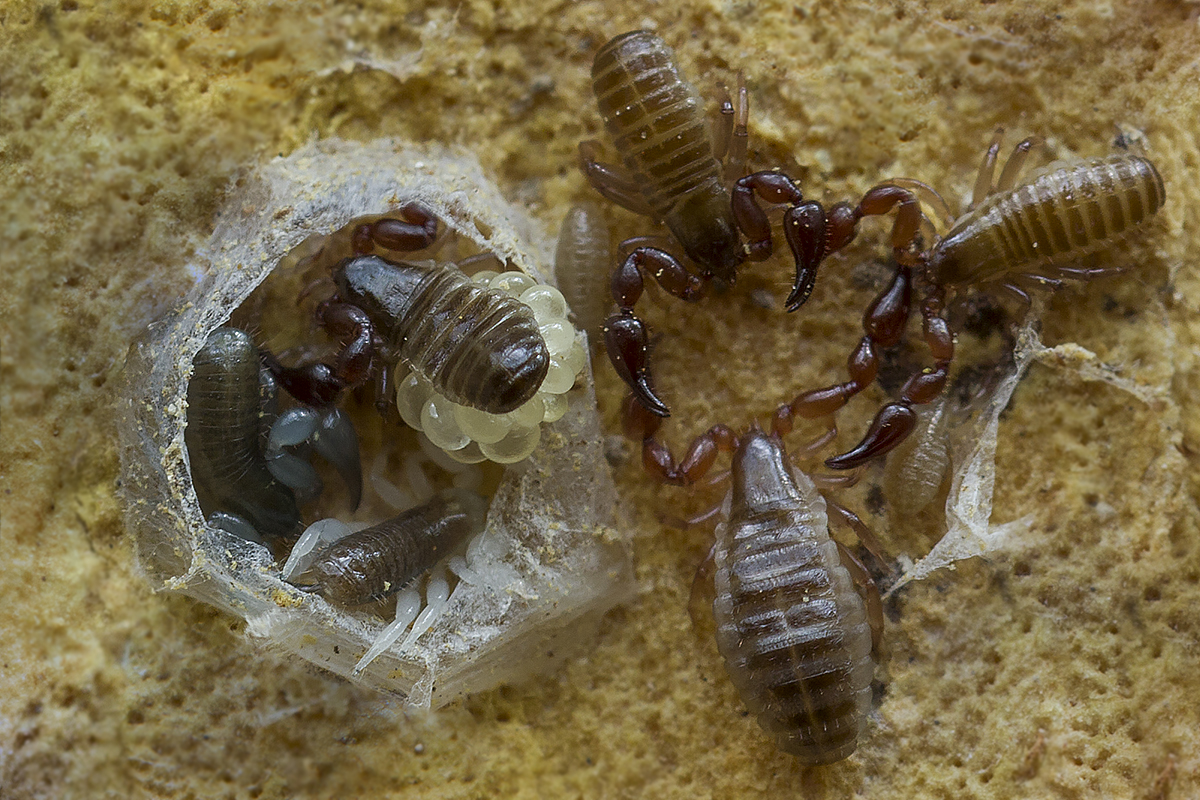
A group of pseudoscorpion (Paratemnoides nidificator) adults, the females of which will eventually be subject to matriphagy

=== Pseudoscorpions ===
==== Paratemnoides nidificator ====
Matriphagy in this species of pseudoscorpions is usually observed during times of food scarcity. After their offspring hatch, mothers exit their nests and wait to be consumed. Offspring follow their mothers out of the nest where they grab onto her legs and proceed to feed through her leg joints, similar to that of Australomisidia ergandros.

Females of this species are able to produce more than one clutch of offspring if their first clutch was unsuccessful.

Matriphagy in this species has been predicted to prevent cannibalism between siblings as well.

== Evolution ==
The adaptive value of matriphagy is based on the benefits provided to the offspring and the costs borne by the mother. Functionally analyzing matriphagy in this manner sheds light on why this unusual and extreme form of care has evolved and been selected for.

=== Benefits to offspring ===
- Consuming the mother is a source of nutrition which is important for growth and development.
- The body mass and opisthosoma length of spiderlings increases after matriphagy compared to before (opisthosoma is the posterior part of the body in spiders, analogous to the abdomen). Additionally, body mass tends to be higher for spiderlings that engage in matriphagy as compared to those that do not.
- Matriphagy advances molting time. Molting is the growing of a larger exoskeleton and shedding the old one. Advancement of molting time means that the spiders are able to grow at a faster rate.
- Matriphagous spiderlings tend to experience significantly greater survival rates and fitness compared to non-matriphagous offspring at dispersal.
- Matriphagous spiderlings hunt larger prey and show much more complete prey consumption than non-matriphagous spiderlings.
- Matriphagy improves sociality in spiders, primarily by reducing sibling cannibalism.

=== Costs and benefits to the mother ===
Unlike other milder forms of parental care, matriphagy necessarily costs the mother her life. Nevertheless, matriphagy may serve the mother's reproductive fitness, considering reproductive output, egg sac development, and number of young reared. The key question is whether the mother would produce more surviving offspring by evading matriphagy and reproducing again or by engaging in matriphagy and producing only one clutch.

- In the black lace-weaver (Amaurobius ferox) around 80% of females separated prior to matriphagy produce second egg sacs and only approximately 40% of these develop completely (compared to the >90% development of egg sacs in the first brood).
- Additionally, the number of spiderlings in the second brood tends to be significantly lower than in the first brood. These individuals are also smaller than the spiders in the first brood.
- Females that successively lay two egg sacs have a lower expected output of dispersing offspring than females that are victims of matriphagy and produce only a single clutch.

== Similar forms of parental care ==
Matriphagy is one of the most extreme forms of parental care observed in the animal kingdom. However, in some species such as the Funnel-web spider Coelotes terrestris, matriphagy is only observed under certain conditions and extended maternal protection is the main method by which offspring receive care. In other organisms such as the African social velvet spider, Stegodyphus mimosarum and Caecilian amphibians, parental behavior closely related in form and function to matriphagy is used.

=== Extended care in a funnel-web spider: Coelotes terrestris ===
The ‘maternal social’ spider, Coelotes terrestris (Funnel-web spider) uses extended maternal care as a reproductive model for its offspring. Upon laying the egg sac, a C. terrestris mother stands guard and incubates the sac for 3 to 4 weeks. She stays with her young from the time of their emergence until dispersal approximately 5 to 6 weeks later. During the offsprings’ development, mothers will provide the spiderlings prey based on their levels of gregariousness.

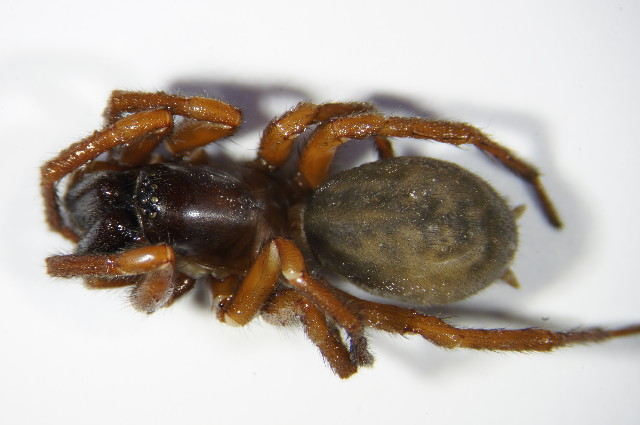
Funnel-web spider (Coelotes terrestris)

Protecting the egg sacs from predation and parasites yields a high benefit to cost ratio for the mothers. Fitness of the mother is highly correlated to offspring developmental state—a mother in better condition yields larger young that are better at surviving predation. The presence of the mother also protects the offspring against parasitism. In addition, the mother can keep feeding while guarding her progeny without any weight loss, allowing her to collect sufficient food for both herself and her offspring.

Overall, costs of protecting the egg sac are low. Upon separation from egg sacs, 90% of females have the energy sustenance to lay new sacs, although it does induce a time loss of several weeks that could potentially affect reproductive success.

In experimental conditions, costs arose if maternal care was not provided, with egg sacs drying out and developing molds, thus illustrating that maternal care is essential for survival. Experimental food-deprived broods reared by the mother induced matriphagy, where 77% of offspring consumed their mother upon birth. This suggests that matriphagy can exist under nutrient-limited conditions, but the costs generally outweigh the benefits when mothers have sufficient access to resources.

=== Parental investment by skin-feeding in Caecilian amphibians ===
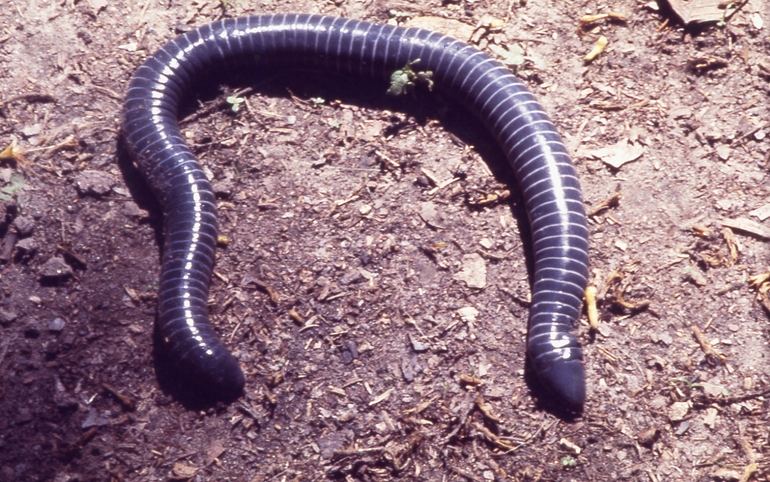
The ringed caecilian is an example of an oviparous caecilian that exhibits parental investment through skin-feeding of the oviduct lining.

Caecilian amphibians are worm-like in appearance, and mothers have thick epithelial skin layers. The skin on a caecilian mother is used for a form of parent-offspring nutrient transfer. In at least two species, Boulengerula taitana and Siphonops annulatus, the young feed on the mother's skin by tearing it off with their teeth. Because these two are not closely related, either this behaviour is more common than currently observed or it evolved independently. The consumed skin then regenerates within a few days.

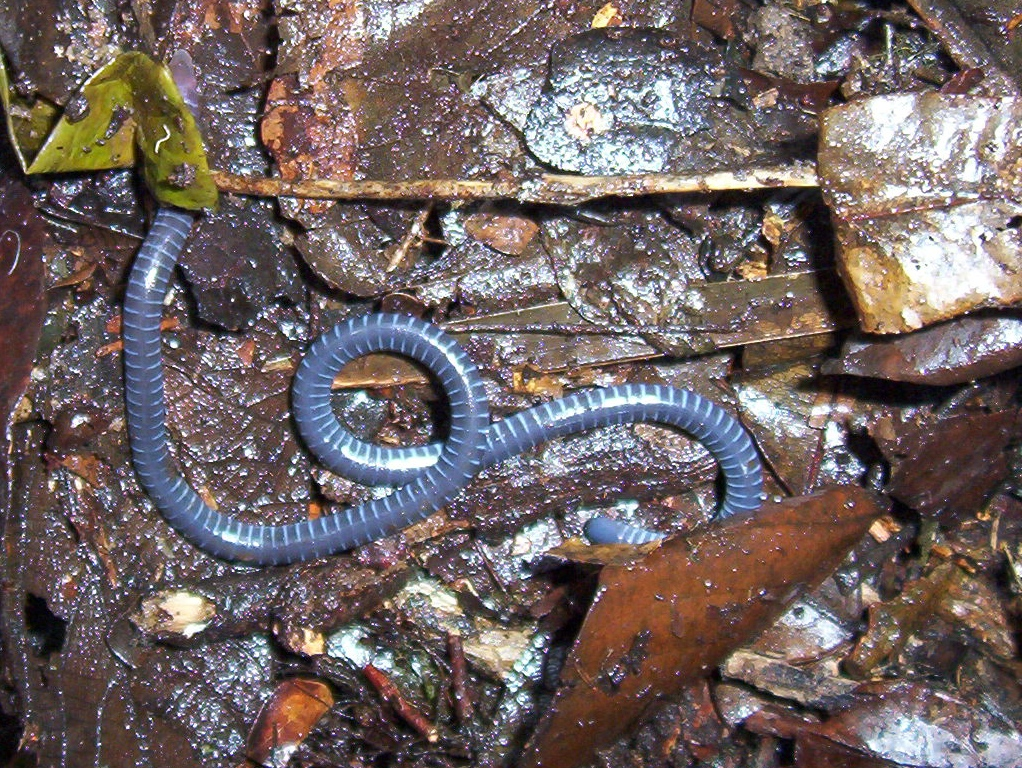
Boulengerula taitanus, a species of Caecilians known to exhibit matriphagy

The Taita African caecilian Boulengerula taitana is an oviparous (egg-laying) caecilian whose skin transforms in brooding females to supply nutrients to growing offspring. The offspring are born with specific dentition that they can use to peel and eat the outer epidermal layer of their mother's skin. Young move around their mother's bodies, using their lower jaws to lift and peel the mother's skin while vigorously pressing their heads against her abdomen. To account for this, the epidermis of brooding females can be up to twice the thickness of non-brooding females.

Viviparous (developing in the mother) caecilians, on the other hand, have specialized fetal dentition which can be used for scraping lipid-rich secretions and cellular materials from the maternal oviduct lining. The ringed caecilian Siphonops annulatus, an oviparous caecilian, exhibits characteristics similar to viviparous caecilians. Mothers have paler skin tones than non-attending females, suggesting that offspring feed on glandular secretions on the mother's skin—a process that resembles mammalian lactation. This scraping method is different from the peeling actions performed by oviparous caecilians.

For both oviparous and viviparous caecilians, delayed investment is a common benefit. Providing nutrition through the skin allows for redirection of nutrients, yielding fewer and larger offspring than caecilians who only provide their offspring with yolk nutrients. Rather than the mother sacrificing herself and solely being used for the offspring's nutrition, caecilian mothers supplement their offspring's growth; they provide enough nutrients for the offspring to survive, but not at the cost of their own life.

=== Gerontophagy in social spiders, genus Stegodyphus ===
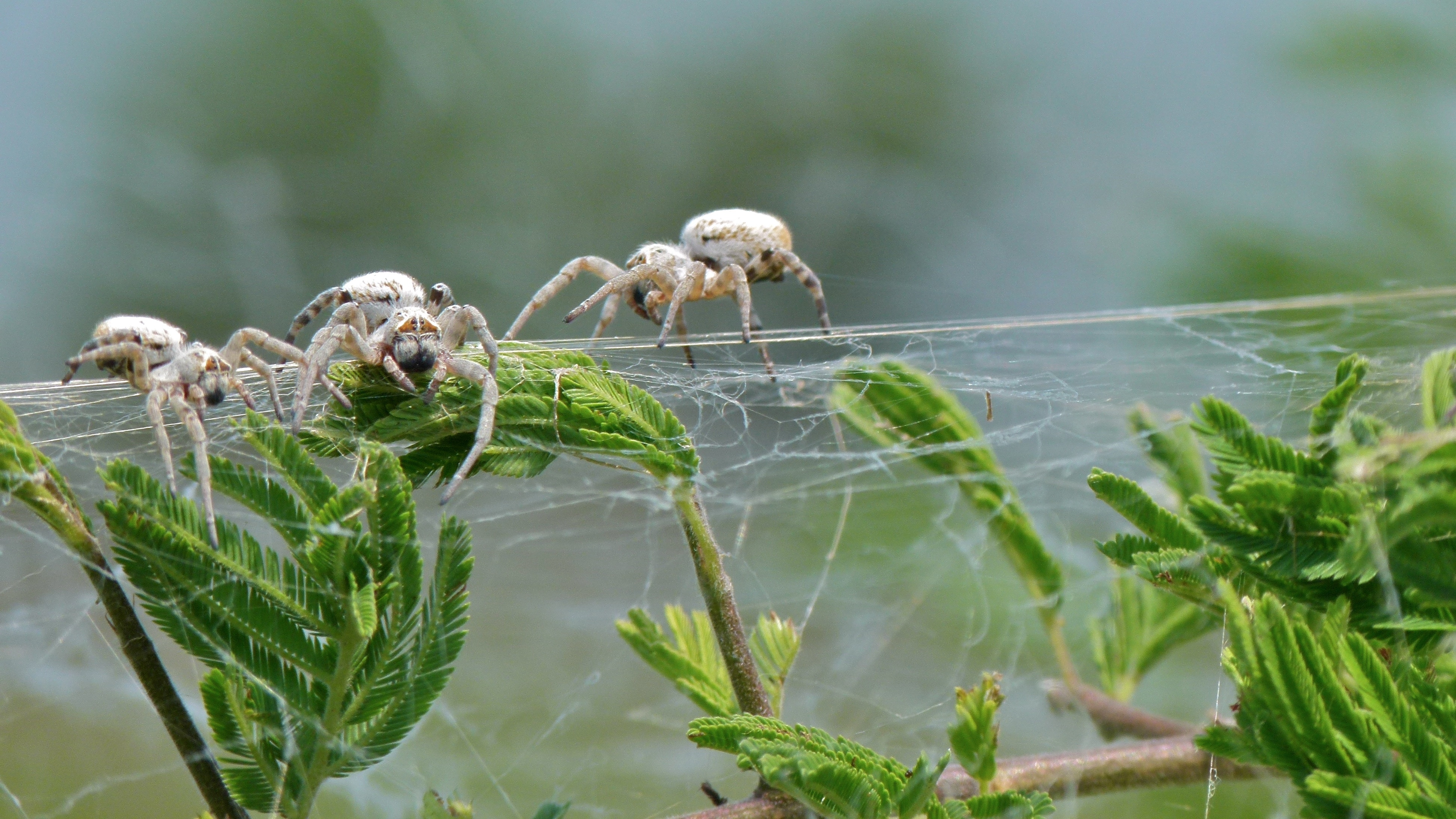
An example of social spiders (Stegodyphus dumicola) that have been found to participate in gerontophagy as a form of parental care

Stegodyphus mothers liquefy their inner organs and maternal tissue into food deposits. The African social velvet spider Stegodyphus mimosarum and the African social spider Stegodyphus dumicola are two social spider species that eat their mothers and other adult females, which is unique since social spiders do not tend to exhibit cannibalistic life history traits. In these specific spiders, deceased females are often found shriveled with shrunken abdomens. Offspring suck nutrients primarily from the dorsal part of the adult female's abdomen, and she may still be alive during this process.

This behavior is not quite the same as matriphagy because Stegodyphus spiderlings are perfectly tolerant to other offspring, healthy conspecifics, and members of other species, suggesting that ordinary cannibalism is suppressed. Instead, the parental care exhibited is known as "gerontophagy", or the "consumption of old individuals" (geron = old person, phagy = to feed on). Gerontophagy is the final act of care for the offspring, and some offspring are found larger than others. This implies that some young spiders are already able to feed on prey by themselves and gerontophagy as a source of nutrition is supplemental rather than necessary. Thus, there exists the 'cannibal's kin-dilemma', which reveals a form of kin selection in social spiders. In this scenario, kin selection should counteract cannibalism of related individuals in social spiders, but any designated victim should prefer to be eaten by available close relatives.

== Cultural significance ==
Those who have been exposed to matriphagy may be frightened by such a seemingly strange and bizarre natural behavior, especially since it is mainly observed in already feared organisms. Thus, matriphagy is often posed as perpetuation of a long held fear of arachnids in human society.

In contrast, others may look to matriphagy as a leading example of purity, as it represents an instinctive form of altruism. Altruism in this case refers to an "intentional action ultimately for the welfare of others that entails at least the possibility of either no benefit or a loss to the actor," and is a highly popularized and desirable concept in many human cultures. Matriphagy can be viewed as altruism, insofar as participating mothers "sacrifice" their survival for the welfare of their offspring. Although participation in matriphagy is not truly an intentional action, mothers are nevertheless driven by natural selection pressures based on offspring fitness to engage in such behavior. This in turn creates a cycle that perpetuates altruistic matriphagous behavior through generations. Such an example of altruism on a purely biological level differs severely from human standards of altruism, which are influenced by moral virtues such as rationality, trust, and reciprocity.

== List of species that engage in matriphagy ==
=== Spiders ===
- Agelena labyrinthica
- Amaurobius ferox
- Cheiracanthium japonicum
- Seothyra
- Stegodyphus lineatus
- Stegodyphus sarasinorum
- Eresus sandaliatus

=== Earwigs ===
- Anechura harmandi

=== Strepsiptera ===
The order Strepsiptera is known for hemocoelous vivipary, where the offspring lives in the female's hemocoel and feed on her hemolymph, consuming her from within.

=== Pseudoscorpions ===
- Paratemnoides nidificator

=== Vertebrates ===
- Caecilian
