= Crosbyarachne =

Scientific classification
- Kingdom: Animalia
- Phylum: Arthropoda
- Subphylum: Chelicerata
- Class: Arachnida
- Order: Araneae
- Infraorder: Araneomorphae
- Family: Linyphiidae
- Genus: Crosbyarachne; Charitonov, 1937

Type species
- C. bukovskyi Charitonov, 1937

Species
- Crosbyarachne bukovskyi Charitonov, 1937 – Turkey, Ukraine; Crosbyarachne silvestris (Georgescu, 1973) – Italy, Austria, Romania, Slovenia, Macedonia, Bulgaria, Greece

Genus of spiders

Crosbyarachne is a genus of dwarf spiders that was first described by Dmitry Evstratievich Kharitonov in 1937. As of May 2019 it contains only two species: C. bukovskyi and C. silvestris.
