= Cryptoparachtes =

Scientific classification
- Kingdom: Animalia
- Phylum: Arthropoda
- Subphylum: Chelicerata
- Class: Arachnida
- Order: Araneae
- Infraorder: Araneomorphae
- Family: Dysderidae
- Genus: Cryptoparachtes; Dunin, 1992

Type species
- C. adzharicus Dunin, 1992

Species
- C. adzharicus Dunin, 1992 – Georgia; C. charitonowi (Mcheidze, 1972) – Georgia; C. fedotovi (Charitonov, 1956) – Georgia, Azerbaijan

Genus of spiders

Cryptoparachtes is a genus of Asian woodlouse hunter spiders that was first described by P. M. Dunin in 1992. As of May 2019 it contains only three species: C. adzharicus, C. charitonowi, and C. fedotovi.
