= Crosbyarachne bukovskyi =

Scientific classification
- Kingdom: Animalia
- Phylum: Arthropoda
- Subphylum: Chelicerata
- Class: Arachnida
- Order: Araneae
- Infraorder: Araneomorphae
- Family: Linyphiidae
- Genus: Crosbyarachne
- Species: C. bukovskyi

Binomial name
- Crosbyarachne bukovskyi Charitonov, 1937

Species of spider

Crosbyarachne bukovskyi is a species of dwarf spiders from the genus crosbyarachne. Its range includes Turkey, Ukraine, and Russia (Caucasus).
