= Panamomops =

Scientific classification
- Kingdom: Animalia
- Phylum: Arthropoda
- Subphylum: Chelicerata
- Class: Arachnida
- Order: Araneae
- Infraorder: Araneomorphae
- Family: Linyphiidae
- Genus: Panamomops; Simon, 1884

Type species
- P. sulcifrons (Wider, 1834)

Species
- 13, see text

Synonyms
- Lochkovia Miller & Valesová, 1964; Microstrandina Charitonov, 1937; Panamomopsides Denis, 1962

Genus of spiders

Panamomops is a genus of dwarf spiders that was first described by Eugène Louis Simon in 1884.

== Species ==
As of May 2019 it contains thirteen species:

- Panamomops affinis Miller & Kratochvíl, 1939 – Switzerland, Germany, Austria, Czech Rep., Slovakia
- Panamomops depilis Eskov & Marusik, 1994 – Russia (Central Asia, South Siberia), Kazakhstan
- Panamomops dybowskii (O. Pickard-Cambridge, 1873) – Russia (Europe to Central Siberia)
- Panamomops fagei Miller & Kratochvíl, 1939 – Central Europe, Italy
- Panamomops fedotovi (Charitonov, 1937) – Ukraine, Georgia, Armenia
- Panamomops inconspicuus (Miller & Valesova, 1964) – Italy, Central and Eastern Europe
- Panamomops latifrons Miller, 1959 – Czech Rep., Slovakia, Austria, Balkans
- Panamomops mengei Simon, 1926 – Europe, Russia (Europe to West Siberia and Central Asia), Kazakhstan
- Panamomops mutilus (Denis, 1962) – Spain, France
- Panamomops palmgreni Thaler, 1973 – Germany, Switzerland, Austria, Slovakia
- Panamomops pamiricus Tanasevitch, 1989 – Kyrgyzstan
- Panamomops sulcifrons (Wider, 1834) (type) – Europe
- Panamomops tauricornis (Simon, 1881) – Alps (Germany, Switzerland, Austria, Italy), Finland, Russia (Europe to Far East)
