= Oedignatha =

Scientific classification
- Kingdom: Animalia
- Phylum: Arthropoda
- Subphylum: Chelicerata
- Class: Arachnida
- Order: Araneae
- Infraorder: Araneomorphae
- Family: Liocranidae
- Genus: Oedignatha; Thorell, 1881

Type species
- O. scrobiculata Thorell, 1881

Species
- 37, see text

Genus of spiders

Oedignatha, from Ancient Greek οἰδάω (oidáō), meaning "to swell", and γνάθος (gnáthos), meaning "jaw", is a genus of Asian spiders first described by Tamerlan Thorell in 1881 as a genus of corinnid sac spiders, and moved to Liocranidae in 2014.

== Species ==
As of April 2019 it contains thirty-seven species in Southeast Asia, several of which were transferred from other genera, including O. aleipata from Storena, O. andamanensis & O. raigadensis from Amaurobius, O. proboscidea from Corinna, and O. ferox from the former monotypic genus Aepygnatha.

- Oedignatha affinis Simon, 1897 – Sri Lanka
- Oedignatha albofasciata Strand, 1907 – India
- Oedignatha aleipata (Marples, 1955) – Samoa
- Oedignatha andamanensis (Tikader, 1977) – India (Andaman Is.)
- Oedignatha barbata Deeleman-Reinhold, 2001 – Thailand
- Oedignatha bicolor Simon, 1896 – Sri Lanka
- Oedignatha binoyii Reddy & Patel, 1993 – India
- Oedignatha bucculenta Thorell, 1897 – Myanmar
- Oedignatha canaca Berland, 1938 – Vanuatu
- Oedignatha carli Reimoser, 1934 – India
- Oedignatha coriacea Simon, 1897 – Sri Lanka
- Oedignatha dentifera Reimoser, 1934 – India
- Oedignatha escheri Reimoser, 1934 – India
- Oedignatha ferox (Thorell, 1897) – Myanmar
- Oedignatha flavipes Simon, 1897 – Sri Lanka
- Oedignatha gulosa Simon, 1897 – Sri Lanka
- Oedignatha indica Reddy & Patel, 1993 – India
- Oedignatha jocquei Deeleman-Reinhold, 2001 – Thailand
- Oedignatha lesserti Reimoser, 1934 – India
- Oedignatha major Simon, 1896 – Sri Lanka
- Oedignatha microscutata Reimoser, 1934 – India
- Oedignatha mogamoga Marples, 1955 – Seychelles, Malaysia, Indonesia (Borneo). Introduced to Samoa
- Oedignatha montigena Simon, 1897 – Sri Lanka
- Oedignatha platnicki Song & Zhu, 1998 – China (Hong Kong), Taiwan
- Oedignatha poonaensis Majumder & Tikader, 1991 – India
- Oedignatha proboscidea (Strand, 1913) – Sri Lanka
- Oedignatha procerula Simon, 1897 – India
- Oedignatha raigadensis Bastawade, 2006 – India
- Oedignatha retusa Simon, 1897 – Sri Lanka
- Oedignatha rugulosa Thorell, 1897 – Myanmar
- Oedignatha scrobiculata Thorell, 1881 (type) – Seychelles, Reunion, India, Thailand, Malaysia, Philippines, Indonesia, Taiwan
- Oedignatha shillongensis Biswas & Majumder, 1995 – India
- Oedignatha sima Simon, 1886 – Thailand
- Oedignatha spadix Deeleman-Reinhold, 2001 – Indonesia (Sulawesi, Lesser Sunda Is.)
- Oedignatha striata Simon, 1897 – Sri Lanka
- Oedignatha tricuspidata Reimoser, 1934 – India
- Oedignatha uncata Reimoser, 1934 – India
