= Amaurobius asuncionis =

Scientific classification
- Kingdom: Animalia
- Phylum: Arthropoda
- Subphylum: Chelicerata
- Class: Arachnida
- Order: Araneae
- Infraorder: Araneomorphae
- Family: Amaurobiidae
- Genus: Amaurobius
- Species: A. asuncionis

Binomial name
- Amaurobius asuncionis Mello-Leitão, 1946

Species of spider

Amaurobius asuncionis is a species of spider in the family Amaurobiidae, found in Paraguay.
