= Amaurobius ruffoi =

Scientific classification
- Kingdom: Animalia
- Phylum: Arthropoda
- Subphylum: Chelicerata
- Class: Arachnida
- Order: Araneae
- Infraorder: Araneomorphae
- Family: Amaurobiidae
- Genus: Amaurobius
- Species: A. ruffoi

Binomial name
- Amaurobius ruffoi Thaler, 1990

Synonyms
- Amaurobius sciakyi Pesarini, 1991

Species of spider

Amaurobius ruffoi is a species of spider in the family Amaurobiidae, found in Italy.
