= Oedignatha coriacea =

Scientific classification
- Kingdom: Animalia
- Phylum: Arthropoda
- Subphylum: Chelicerata
- Class: Arachnida
- Order: Araneae
- Infraorder: Araneomorphae
- Family: Liocranidae
- Genus: Oedignatha
- Species: O. coriacea

Binomial name
- Oedignatha coriacea Simon, 1897

Species of spider

Oedignatha coriacea is a species of spider of the genus Oedignatha endemic to Sri Lanka.
