= Amaurobius pelops =

Conservation status
- Endangered (IUCN 3.1)

Scientific classification
- Kingdom: Animalia
- Phylum: Arthropoda
- Subphylum: Chelicerata
- Class: Arachnida
- Order: Araneae
- Infraorder: Araneomorphae
- Family: Amaurobiidae
- Genus: Amaurobius
- Species: A. pelops

Binomial name
- Amaurobius pelops Thaler & Knoflach, 1991

Synonyms
- Amaurobius atticus Thaler & Knoflach, 1995

Species of spider

Amaurobius pelops is a species of spider in the family Amaurobiidae, found in Greece.
