= Cryptoparachtes adzharicus =

Scientific classification
- Kingdom: Animalia
- Phylum: Arthropoda
- Subphylum: Chelicerata
- Class: Arachnida
- Order: Araneae
- Infraorder: Araneomorphae
- Family: Dysderidae
- Genus: Cryptoparachtes
- Species: C. adzharicus

Binomial name
- Cryptoparachtes adzharicus Dunin, 1992

Species of spider

Cryptoparachtes adzharicus is a spider species found in Georgia.
