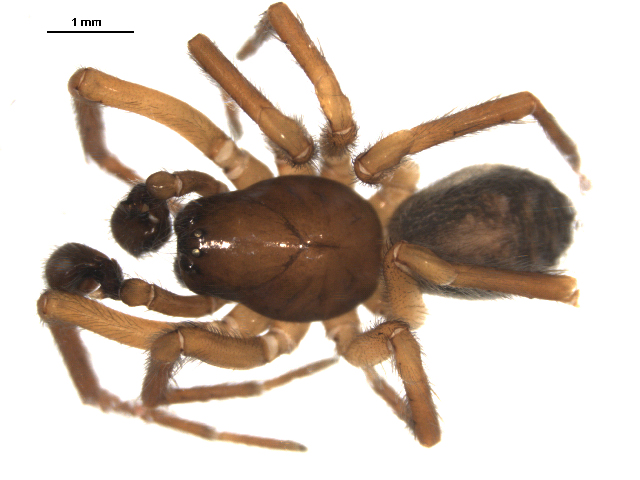
- A. borealis, male
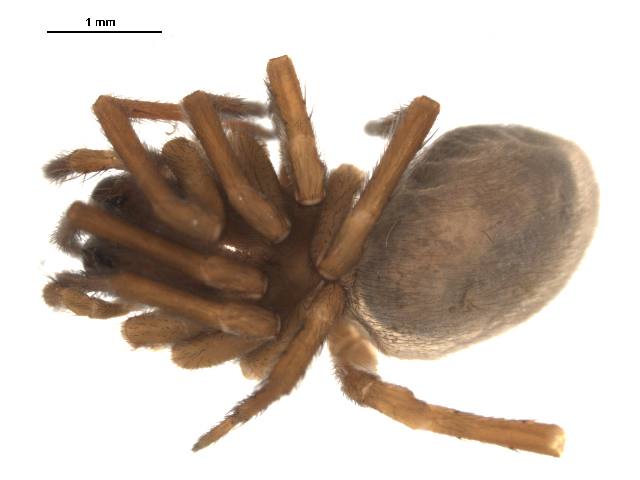
- A. borealis, female

Conservation status
- Secure (NatureServe)

Scientific classification
- Kingdom: Animalia
- Phylum: Arthropoda
- Subphylum: Chelicerata
- Class: Arachnida
- Order: Araneae
- Infraorder: Araneomorphae
- Family: Amaurobiidae
- Genus: Amaurobius
- Species: A. borealis

Binomial name
- Amaurobius borealis Emerton, 1909

= Amaurobius borealis =

Species of spider

Amaurobius borealis is a species of hacklemesh weaver in the spider family Amaurobiidae. It is found in the United States and Canada.
