= Amaurobius candia =

Scientific classification
- Kingdom: Animalia
- Phylum: Arthropoda
- Subphylum: Chelicerata
- Class: Arachnida
- Order: Araneae
- Infraorder: Araneomorphae
- Family: Amaurobiidae
- Genus: Amaurobius
- Species: A. candia

Binomial name
- Amaurobius candia Thaler & Knoflach, 2002

Species of spider

Amaurobius candia is a species of spider in the family Amaurobiidae, found in Crete.
