= Amaurobius antipovae =

Scientific classification
- Kingdom: Animalia
- Phylum: Arthropoda
- Subphylum: Chelicerata
- Class: Arachnida
- Order: Araneae
- Infraorder: Araneomorphae
- Family: Amaurobiidae
- Genus: Amaurobius
- Species: A. antipovae

Binomial name
- Amaurobius antipovae Marusik & Kovblyuk, 2004

Species of spider

Amaurobius antipovae is a species of spider in the family Amaurobiidae, found in Russia and Georgia.
