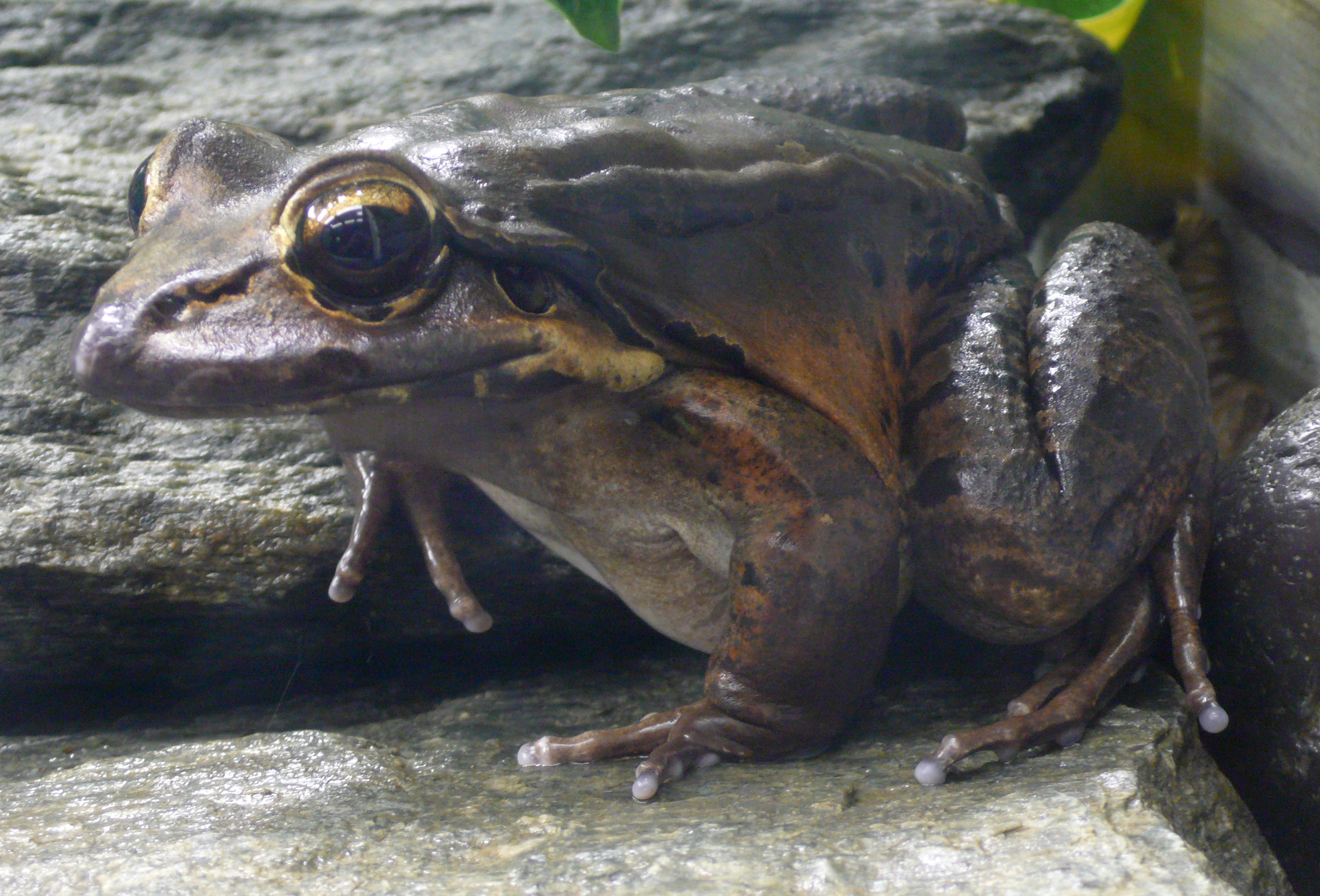

Conservation status
- Critically Endangered (IUCN 3.1)

Scientific classification
- Kingdom: Animalia
- Phylum: Chordata
- Class: Amphibia
- Order: Anura
- Family: Leptodactylidae
- Genus: Leptodactylus
- Species: L. fallax

Binomial name
- Leptodactylus fallax (Müller, 1926)

= Leptodactylus fallax =

Species of amphibian

Leptodactylus fallax, commonly known as the mountain chicken or giant ditch frog, is a critically endangered species of frog that is native to the Caribbean islands of Dominica and Montserrat. The population declined by at least 80% from 1995 to 2004, with further significant declines later. A tiny wild population remains on Dominica where there are efforts to preserve it, but few or none survive in the wild on Montserrat and its survival now relies on a captive breeding project involving several zoos. The initial decline was linked to hunting for human consumption, along with habitat loss and natural disasters, but the most serious threat now appears to be the fungal disease chytridiomycosis, which was the primary cause of the most recent rapid decline. On Montserrat it is known as the mountain chicken, while on Dominica it is known as the crapaud, which simply means "toad" in French.

== Etymology ==
The mountain chicken is nicknamed thus because it is preyed upon and considered a local delicacy on the islands of Montserrat and Dominica, where it is found. It supposedly tastes like chicken.

== Description ==
The mountain chicken is one of the largest frogs in the world, the largest in its family Leptodactylidae, and the largest frog native to the Caribbean. It can reach 1 kg (2.2 lb) in weight and up to 22 cm (8.7 in) in snout–to–vent length, although a more typical adult size is 17–18 cm (6.7–7.1 in). Females tend to be larger than males. It is highly variable in color, with the upperparts varying from a uniform chestnut-brown to being barred or spotted. The color becomes more orange-yellow on the sides of the body, and pale yellow on the underparts. A black line runs from the snout to the angle of the mouth, and the upper-legs often have broad banding. The mountain chicken also has a distinctive, dark-outlined fold from the back of the head to the groin, and large, conspicuous eyes with dark pupils and a golden iris. The body is robust, with a large head and well-muscled legs. The male mountain chicken may be distinguished from the female by its smaller size, and by the black spur on each of its thumbs, which are used to clasp the female during amplexus (the mating embrace).

== Distribution and habitat ==
The mountain chicken was once found on many of the Lesser Antillean islands in the eastern Caribbean, but is now restricted to just Dominica and Montserrat. It once occurred in certain places, including Guadeloupe, Martinique, Saint Kitts, and Nevis, but is now extirpated there and may also have inhabited Saint Lucia and Antigua. There was an unsuccessful attempt to introduce it to Jamaica and Puerto Rico (where it is not native). In the early 2000s, the mountain chicken was largely restricted to the Centre Hill of northern Montserrat, having been lost from much of the rest of the island by recent volcanic eruptions, and on the western side of Dominica. It is also found on the eastern side of Dominica, but the species origin there is unclear and it may have been introduced to the area.

The mountain chicken is found in a variety of moist habitats, including dense secondary forest and scrub, hillside plantations, palm groves in river valleys, ravines, and flooded forest. It is most commonly found near streams and springs, and is rarely found in grasslands. On Dominica, it was most abundant at lower altitudes, although it occurs up to 400 m (1,300 ft), and was found up to 430 m (1,410 ft) on Montserrat.

== Behavior and ecology ==
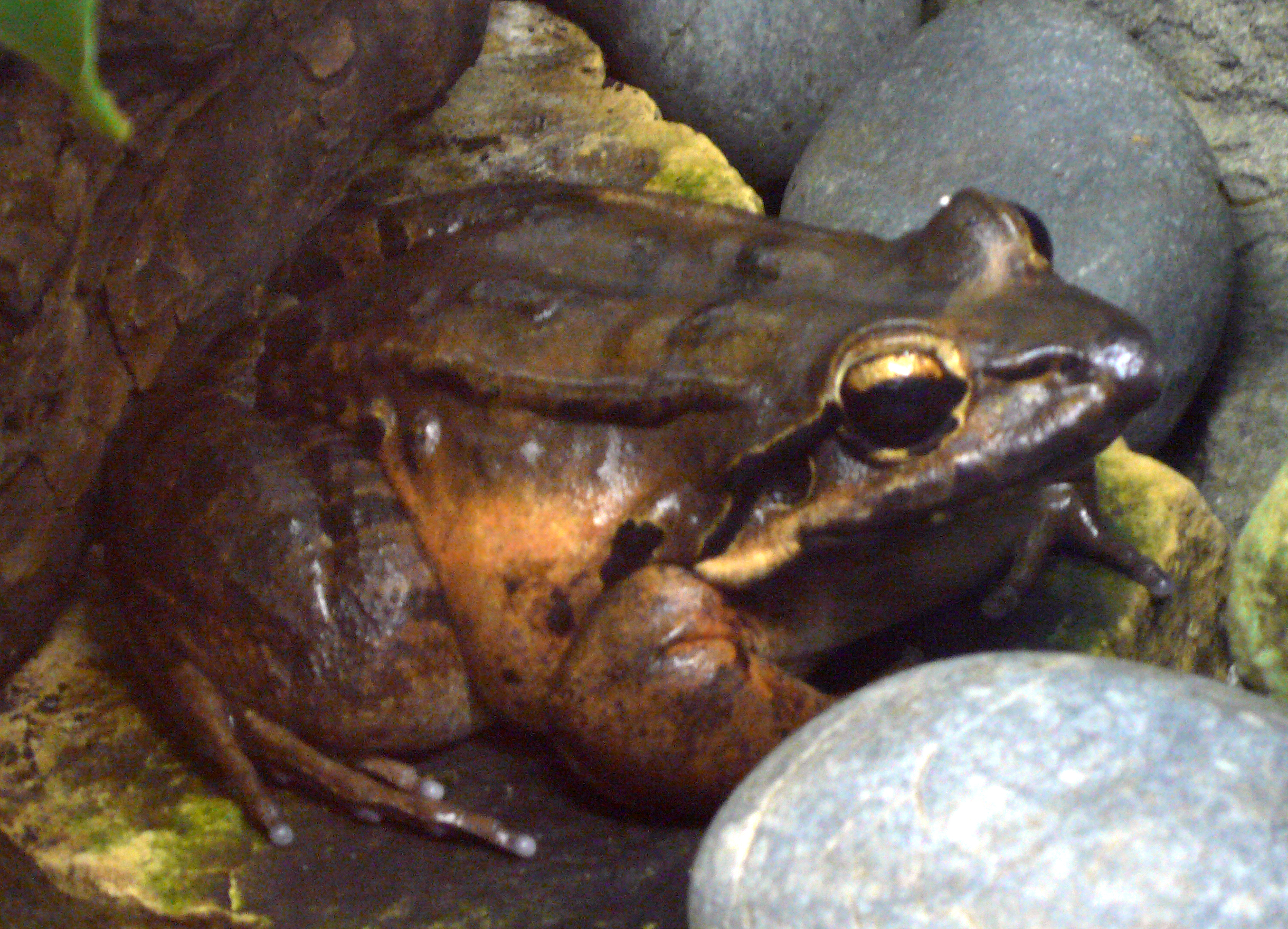
Leptodactylus fallax

The mountain chicken is terrestrial and nocturnal.

A sit-and-wait predator with a voracious appetite, this frog consumes almost anything that can be swallowed whole. It is well camouflaged in its habitat and remains still for long periods before ambushing its prey, usually at night. Its diet is varied, but it is strictly carnivorous, largely consuming crickets and other insects, although millipedes, crustaceans, spiders (including tarantulas) and even small vertebrates, such as other frogs, snakes and small mammals such as bats, are all eaten. Despite its willingness to eat other frogs, except for consuming unfertilized eggs, cannibalism is not known from the mountain chicken. During the day, the mountain chicken frog resides in burrows, which it digs into moist soil.

=== Breeding ===
The mountain chicken has a highly unusual method of reproduction, as unlike most other amphibians which breed in water, this frog breeds in burrows around 50 cm (20 in) deep. The breeding season starts towards the end of the dry season, usually in April when there are heavy seasonal showers, and continues to August or September. At the start of this period, the male frogs compete to gain access to preferred nesting sites by wrestling and making loud 'whooping' calls from forest paths and undergrowth clearings. The winning male occupies a nesting burrow and emits 'trilling barks' to attract a female mate. Once a breeding pair is formed, the male and female engage in amplexus, and the female is stimulated to release a fluid, which the male makes into a foam with rapid paddles of its hind legs. Once the nest is built, which takes 9 to 14 hours, the male leaves the burrow to defend it from intruders, while the female lays the eggs. After the tadpoles have hatched, the female lays up to as many as 25,000 trophic (unfertilized) eggs upon which the tadpoles feed. While the young develop over about 45 days, the female continuously renews the foam, leaving the nest only to feed. Eventually, 26 to 43 froglets emerge from the nest, with the timing of this coinciding with the onset of the wet season, when food is abundant. The mountain chicken reaches maturity at around 3 years, and has a lifespan of approximately 12 years. Mature females only produce one brood per season, but male frogs may father the offspring of more than one female.

== Threats and conservation ==
The initial decline in the species was caused by hunting for human consumption, along with natural disasters and habitat loss. It was estimated that the population had fallen by more than 80 percent from 1995 to 2004. Nevertheless, the species still appeared to be locally common in suitable habitats up until relatively recently, but in 2002, disease appeared on Dominica and the population rapidly declined, while it appeared in 2009 on Montserrat, also causing a rapid decline. It is believed that tens of thousands originally lived on each of the islands inhabited by the species. In 2004, it was estimated that the total population possibly had fallen to 8,000 individuals, but by 2017–2019 there were less than 200 individuals on Dominica and few or none surviving in the wild on Montserrat. A captive breeding program is maintained by several zoos and some offspring have been returned to Montserrat where they live in an enclosure in semi-wild conditions.

=== Hunting ===
On Dominica, this critically endangered frog is favored for its meaty legs, which are cooked in traditional Dominican dishes, and it was, until recently, the country's national dish. Annual harvests were thought to be taking between 8,000 and 36,000 animals before a ban on hunting was introduced. The mountain chicken is particularly vulnerable to such harvesting as it has a relatively small brood size, limiting its ability to recover from heavy losses, while the removal of breeding females is particularly damaging, as the tadpoles are dependent upon the females for food and moisture. The species' large size, loud calls, and tendency to sit in the open also make it a particularly easy target for hunters.

Hunting of the mountain chicken frog was banned on Dominica in the late 1990s, although a three-month open season was declared at the end of 2001, and hunting was not fully prohibited until 2003. Public awareness programs have also been implemented to inform the Dominican public of the threats the mountain chicken faces and to try to discourage hunting.

=== Disease ===
Perhaps the greatest, and least understood, threat to the mountain chicken frog today is the deadly fungal disease chytridiomycosis. This disease, which has wiped out many amphibian populations across the globe, established on Dominica in 2002, and in just 1½ year the population on the island declined to near-extinction. Although there have been indications that the Dominican population possibly is slowly starting to recover from this rapid decline, by 2017 it was still estimated to number less than 200 individuals and this was before Hurricane Maria, which might have negatively impacted the tiny population. Sometime between 2005 and 2009, the fungus was introduced to Montserrat, perhaps via small frogs on imported banana leaves, and it spread southwards from northern ports along river systems. In 2009, there was thought to be only two disease-free mountain chicken frog populations remaining. In 2009–2010, the entire Montserrat population rapidly crashed, with only a couple of individuals known to survive in the wild in 2011, and none have been definitely confirmed after 2016. In 2019, the species was regarded as functionally extinct on Montserrat.

=== Other threats ===
The mountain chicken has also lost huge areas of its habitat to agriculture, tourist developments, human settlements, and, on Montserrat, volcanic eruptions. On Dominica, the species is largely confined to coastal areas where there is great demand for land for construction, industry and farming, while on Montserrat, volcanic activity since 1995 has exterminated all populations outside of the Centre Hills. Human encroachment upon the species' habitat has also brought it into contact with a range of pollutants. Predation from introduced mammals, such as feral cats, dogs, pigs, and opossums, is also a relatively new threat to the species on Dominica.

In February 2010, volcanic activity from Soufrière Hills on Montserrat covered large parts of the frog's habitat, further endangering the species.

=== Captive breeding ===
Following the catastrophic volcanic eruptions on Montserrat, it became clear that dedicated conservation measures were needed to save the mountain chicken frog from extinction. In July 1999, the Durrell Wildlife Conservation Trust took six male and three female frogs to Jersey Zoo (formerly known as Durrell Wildlife Park) as part of a captive breeding program. Additional frogs were taken from disease-free areas, and the species has readily bred in captivity, with several other zoos achieving further breeding success. These captive frogs now form the basis of a safety-net population should the species become extinct in the wild. In addition, since January 1998, the Montserrat Forestry and Environment Division, in partnership with Fauna and Flora International, has been monitoring the species' population.

Since the captive effort based on the Montserrat population was initiated in 1999 by Jersey Zoo, it has been successfully bred as part of an EEP breeding program involving more than twenty European zoos, along with five US zoos, and viable clutches are produced each year. In 2019, the captive European population numbered 236 individuals. Some frogs bred in Europe have been returned to their native Montserrat, where they were released between 2011 and 2014. This is part of a trial program to determine the later chance of a successful reintroduction and these frogs are closely monitored to see potential differences in mortality to the chytrid fungus that is found throughout Montserrat. They are in a fenced-in semi-wild enclosure where their water pool is heated to 31 °C (88 °F) by solar power, which is above the temperature where the chytrid fungus can live.

From 2007 to 2017, there were attempts to establish a local captive breeding program for the Dominica population of the species, but it did not succeed and was finally abandoned when Hurricane Maria destroyed the facilities in Dominica.
