= Australomisidia elegans =

Scientific classification
- Domain: Eukaryota
- Kingdom: Animalia
- Phylum: Arthropoda
- Subphylum: Chelicerata
- Class: Arachnida
- Order: Araneae
- Infraorder: Araneomorphae
- Family: Thomisidae
- Genus: Australomisidia
- Species: A. elegans

Binomial name
- Australomisidia elegans (L. Koch, 1876)

Synonyms
- Diaea elegans L. Koch, 187

Species of spider

Australomisidia elegans is a species of spider in the family Thomisidae. It is found in Australia.
