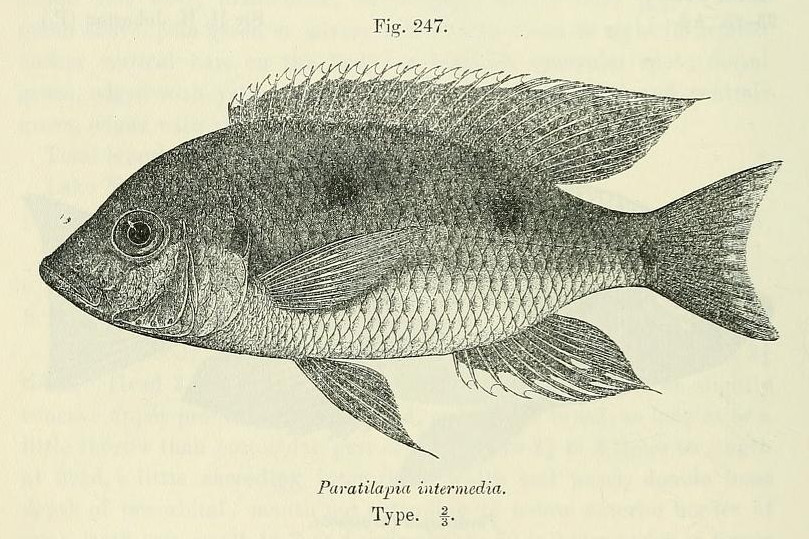
- Ctenopharynx intermedius

Scientific classification
- Kingdom: Animalia
- Phylum: Chordata
- Class: Actinopterygii
- Division: Teleostei
- Order: Cichliformes
- Family: Cichlidae
- Tribe: Haplochromini
- Genus: Ctenopharynx; Eccles & Trewavas, 1989

Type species
- Hemichromis intermedius Günther, 1864

= Ctenopharynx =

Genus of fishes

Ctenopharynx is a small genus of haplochromine cichlids from East Africa. Two of its species are endemic to Lake Malawi, while the third occurs in Lake Malawi and the upper reaches of the Shire River.

== Species ==
There are currently three recognized species in this genus:

- Ctenopharynx intermedius (Günther, 1864) (Blackspot Climbing Perch)
- Ctenopharynx nitidus (Trewavas, 1935)
- Ctenopharynx pictus (Trewavas, 1935)
