= Cryptoparachtes fedotovi =

Scientific classification
- Kingdom: Animalia
- Phylum: Arthropoda
- Subphylum: Chelicerata
- Class: Arachnida
- Order: Araneae
- Infraorder: Araneomorphae
- Family: Dysderidae
- Genus: Cryptoparachtes
- Species: C. fedotovi

Binomial name
- Cryptoparachtes fedotovi (Charitonov, 1956)

Species of spider

Cryptoparachtes fedotovi is a spider species found in Georgia and Azerbaijan.
