= Amaurobius longipes =

Conservation status
- Endangered (IUCN 3.1)

Scientific classification
- Kingdom: Animalia
- Phylum: Arthropoda
- Subphylum: Chelicerata
- Class: Arachnida
- Order: Araneae
- Infraorder: Araneomorphae
- Family: Amaurobiidae
- Genus: Amaurobius
- Species: A. longipes

Binomial name
- Amaurobius longipes Thaler & Knoflach, 1995

Species of spider

Amaurobius longipes is a species of spider in the family Amaurobiidae, found in Greece.
