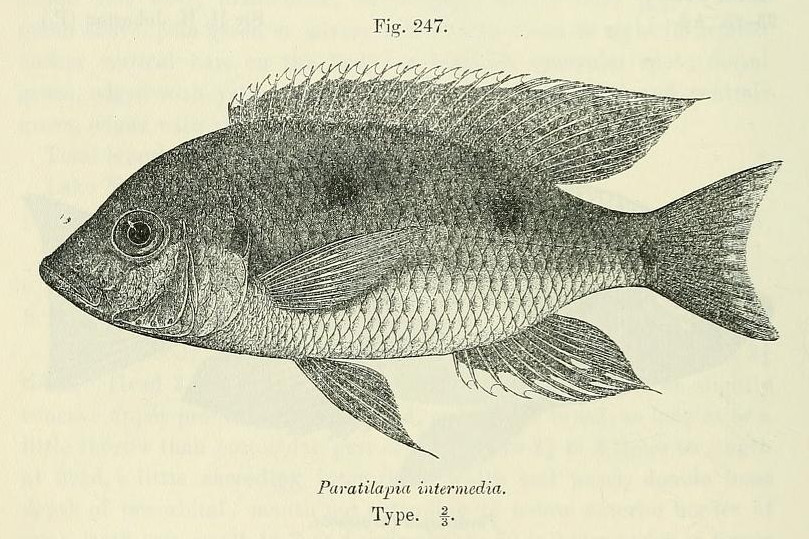

Conservation status
- Least Concern (IUCN 3.1)

Scientific classification
- Kingdom: Animalia
- Phylum: Chordata
- Class: Actinopterygii
- Order: Cichliformes
- Family: Cichlidae
- Genus: Ctenopharynx
- Species: C. intermedius

Binomial name
- Ctenopharynx intermedius (Günther,1864)

Synonyms
- Hemichromis intermedius Günther, 1864; Cyrtocara intermedia (Günther, 1864); Cyrtocara intermedius (Günther, 1864); Haplochromis intermedius (Günther, 1864); Otopharynx intermedius (Günther, 1864); Paratilapia intermedia (Günther, 1864)

= Blackspot climbing perch =

Species of fish

The blackspot climbing perch (Ctenopharynx intermedius) is a species of fish in the family Cichlidae. It is native to Lake Malawi and the upper Shire River.
