= Ctenopharynx nitidus =

Conservation status
- Least Concern (IUCN 3.1)

Scientific classification
- Kingdom: Animalia
- Phylum: Chordata
- Class: Actinopterygii
- Order: Cichliformes
- Family: Cichlidae
- Genus: Ctenopharynx
- Species: C. nitidus

Binomial name
- Ctenopharynx nitidus (Trewavas, 1935)

Synonyms
- Haplochromis nitidus Trewavas, 1935; Cyrtocara nitida (Trewavas, 1935); Cyrtocara nitidus (Trewavas, 1935); Otopharynx nitidus (Trewavas, 1935)

Species of fish

Ctenopharynx nitidus is a species of fish in the family Cichlidae. It is endemic to Lake Malawi.
