= Amaurobius vachoni =

Scientific classification
- Kingdom: Animalia
- Phylum: Arthropoda
- Subphylum: Chelicerata
- Class: Arachnida
- Order: Araneae
- Infraorder: Araneomorphae
- Family: Amaurobiidae
- Genus: Amaurobius
- Species: A. vachoni

Binomial name
- Amaurobius vachoni Hubert, 1965

Species of spider

Amaurobius vachoni is a species of spider in the family Amaurobiidae, found in Spain.
