= Amaurobius phaeacus =

Scientific classification
- Domain: Eukaryota
- Kingdom: Animalia
- Phylum: Arthropoda
- Subphylum: Chelicerata
- Class: Arachnida
- Order: Araneae
- Infraorder: Araneomorphae
- Family: Amaurobiidae
- Genus: Amaurobius
- Species: A. phaeacus

Binomial name
- Amaurobius phaeacus Thaler & Knoflach, 1998

Species of spider

Amaurobius phaeacus is a species of spiders in the family Amaurobiidae, found in Albania, North Macedonia and Greece.
