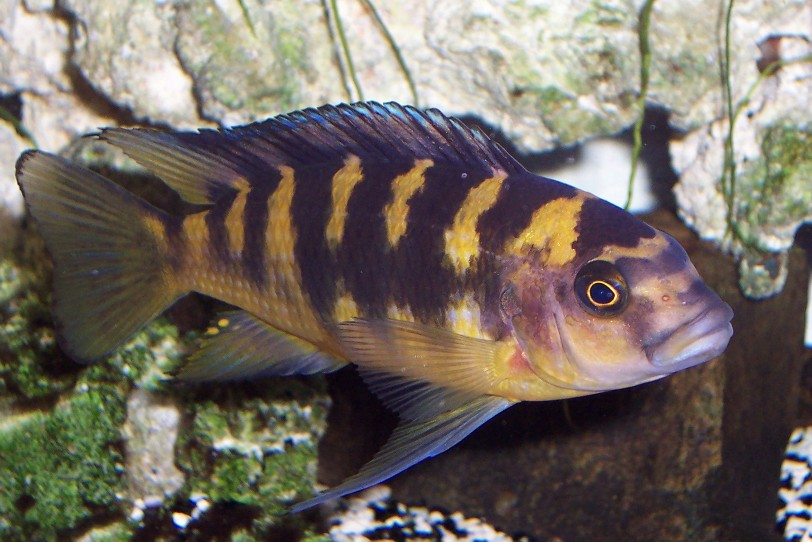
- A male bumblebee cichlid

Conservation status
- Least Concern (IUCN 3.1)

Scientific classification
- Kingdom: Animalia
- Phylum: Chordata
- Class: Actinopterygii
- Division: Teleostei
- Order: Cichliformes
- Family: Cichlidae
- Genus: Pseudotropheus
- Species: P. crabro

Binomial name
- Pseudotropheus crabro (Ribbink & D. S. C. Lewis, 1982)

Synonyms
- Melanochromis crabro Ribbink & D. S. C. Lewis, 1982; Maylandia crabro (Ribbink & D. S. C. Lewis, 1982)

= Pseudotropheus crabro =

Bumblebee cichlid

Species of fish

Pseudotropheus crabro, also known as the bumblebee cichlid or hornet cichlid, is a species of cichlid endemic to Lake Malawi where it is found in different habitats but most frequently in large caves or in the vicinity of large boulders. This species can reach a length of 16 centimetres (6.3 in) SL.

The bumblebee cichlid has an elongate body with vertical yellow-and-black "bumblebee" bars. Juveniles are brightly colored but become darker when mature, especially for males. This fish is known for its ability to rapidly change its colors. They are mouthbrooders like many other cichlids from Lake Malawi.

== Diet ==
Bumblebee cichlids feed on a wide variety of food items, but are particularly specialized for feeding on Argulus africanus fish lice that parasitize the kampango (Bagrus meridionalis), a large catfish. They will also pick and feed on necrotic tissues on their client. As cleaner fish associated with the kampango, they have been observed following closely behind the catfish. This behaviour also occurs in captive settings. In the wild, they are known to approach human divers, possibly to examine them for parasites. However, they do not clean other cichlids or other catfish species.

Bumblebee cichlids are also behaviourally specialized for feeding on the eggs of kampango, persistently raiding the catfish's nests despite the defending parents. This food source is only available during the kampango's breeding season.

The catfish apparently recognises the species as a cleaner. Notable is that P. crabro has also been found preying upon the eggs of the Bagrus meridionalis, but will change colour to a dark brown while doing so.

== See also ==
- Mbuna
- List of freshwater aquarium fish species
