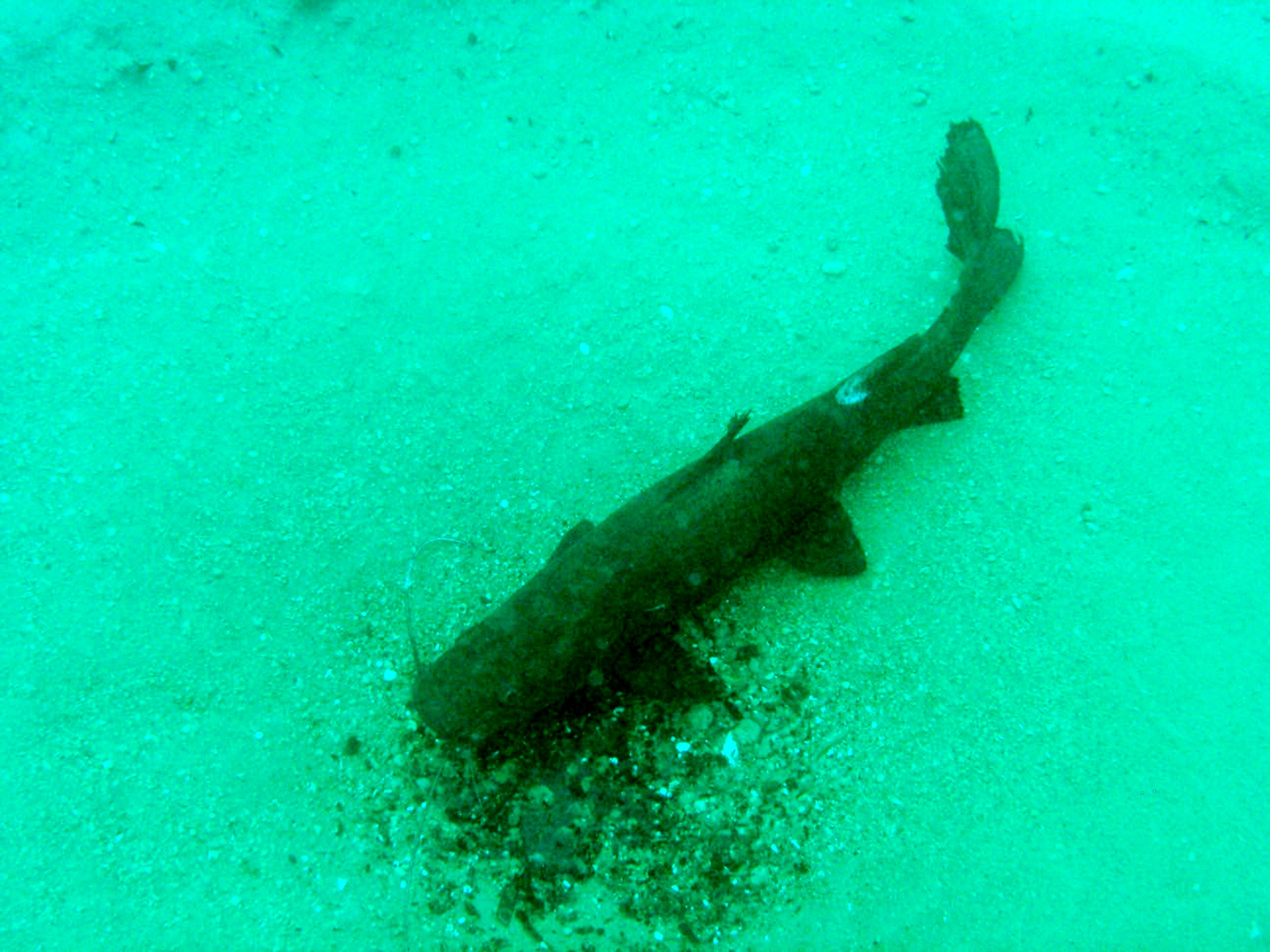

Conservation status
- Critically Endangered (IUCN 3.1)

Scientific classification
- Kingdom: Animalia
- Phylum: Chordata
- Class: Actinopterygii
- Order: Siluriformes
- Family: Bagridae
- Genus: Bagrus
- Species: B. meridionalis

Binomial name
- Bagrus meridionalis Günther, 1894

= Kampango =

Species of fish

The kampango or kampoyo (Bagrus meridionalis) is a critically endangered species of large and predatory bagrid catfish that is endemic to Lake Malawi, Lake Malombe and the upper Shire River in Africa. It prefers areas near rocks in water shallower than 50 m (160 ft), but it also occurs deeper (not beyond the oxygen limit) and over a sandy or muddy bottom.

== Appearance and behavior ==
The kampango is among the largest fish in the Lake Malawi basin, reaching up to about 1 m (3.3 ft) long, or possibly even 1.5 m (4.9 ft). A common length is around 42 cm (1.4 ft) and females are typically larger than males. Adults are overall blackish, while young are grey with dark spots. During the day kampangos hide in caves, but around dusk or dawn they hunt and eat their prey, primarily cichlids.

=== Breeding ===
The male digs a shallow nest in the sandy bottom, often near rocks, where the female lays several thousand eggs. After hatching, the young mostly eat trophic (unfertilized) egg that their mother lays, but they also take invertebrates that the father brings to them in his mouth. The eggs and young are fiercely guarded by the parents. The young kampango only leave the protection of their parents when around 12 cm (4.7 in) long, but before that most have typically already been eaten by egg- and fry-stealing cichlids like Mylochromis melanonotus and Pseudotropheus crabro. At other times Pseudotropheus crabro has a mutualistic relationship with the kampango, as it will clean it by feeding on parasites and dead tissue. Another catfish, Bathyclarias nyasensis, is a brood parasite of the kampango. Kampango parents have been observed taking care of entire broods of B. nyasensis young as if they were their own. As these broods almost exclusively contain B. nyasensis young, it is suspected that they hatch earlier than the kampango's own eggs and eat them.

In contrast to the nest predators and parasites, certain cichlids, especially Copadichromis pleurostigmoides, Ctenopharynx pictus and Rhamphochromis, will release their young near nesting kampango. The kampango and cichlid parents both protect the mixed group, resulting in a significantly higher survival rate of the kampango young.

== Relationship with humans ==
Kampango are highly prized as an eating fish, and are caught using nets and more commonly line caught, mainly in deep water around Cape Maclear, Salima, Mbenje Island, and Nkhata Bay. Fresh kampango are usually filleted and deep-fried, barbecued, or cooked with tomato and onion as a traditional Malawian dish, served with nsima.

Traditionally regarded as one of the most widespread and common fish in its range, the kampango has declined drastically because of overfishing and is now considered critically endangered by the IUCN. From 2006 to 2016, its population declined by more than 90% based on the fall observed in catch rates in fisheries in southern Lake Malawi.
