= Ctenopharynx pictus =

Conservation status
- Least Concern (IUCN 3.1)

Scientific classification
- Kingdom: Animalia
- Phylum: Chordata
- Class: Actinopterygii
- Order: Cichliformes
- Family: Cichlidae
- Genus: Ctenopharynx
- Species: C. pictus

Binomial name
- Ctenopharynx pictus (Trewavas, 1935)

Synonyms
- Haplochromis nitidus Trewavas, 1935; Cyrtocara nitida (Trewavas, 1935); Cyrtocara nitidus (Trewavas, 1935); Otopharynx nitidus (Trewavas, 1935)

Species of fish

Ctenopharynx pictus is a species of fish in the family Cichlidae. It is restricted to Lake Malawi. It occurs throughout much of the lake, but mainly in rocky habitats at depths of 7–30 m (23–98 ft). It is a mouthbrooder, but the female will often release the young near nesting kampango catfish. Their young are then brought up together.
