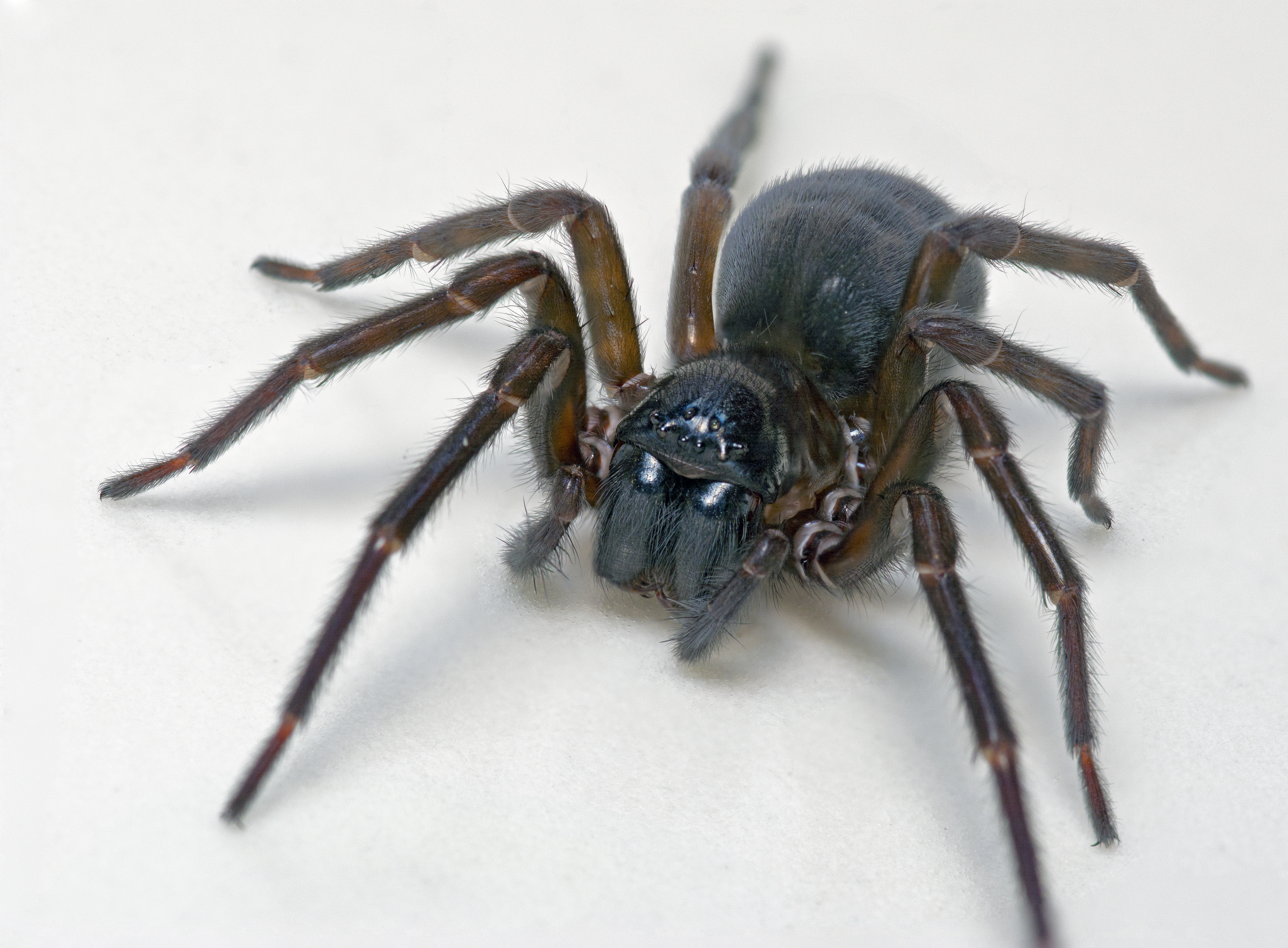

Scientific classification
- Kingdom: Animalia
- Phylum: Arthropoda
- Subphylum: Chelicerata
- Class: Arachnida
- Order: Araneae
- Infraorder: Araneomorphae
- Family: Amaurobiidae
- Genus: Amaurobius
- Species: A. ferox

Binomial name
- Amaurobius ferox (Walckenaer, 1830)

Synonyms
- Clubiona ferox Amaurobius cryptarum Ciniflo ferox Ciniflo mordax Amaurobius mordax Amaurobius corsicus Amaurobius peninsulanus

= Amaurobius ferox =

Species of spider

Amaurobius ferox, sometimes known as the black lace-weaver, is a common nocturnal spider belonging to the family Amaurobiidae and genus Amaurobius. Its genus includes three subsocial species, A. fenestralis, A. similis and A. ferox, all three of which have highly developed subsocial organizations.

Amaurobius ferox originates from Europe

== Description ==
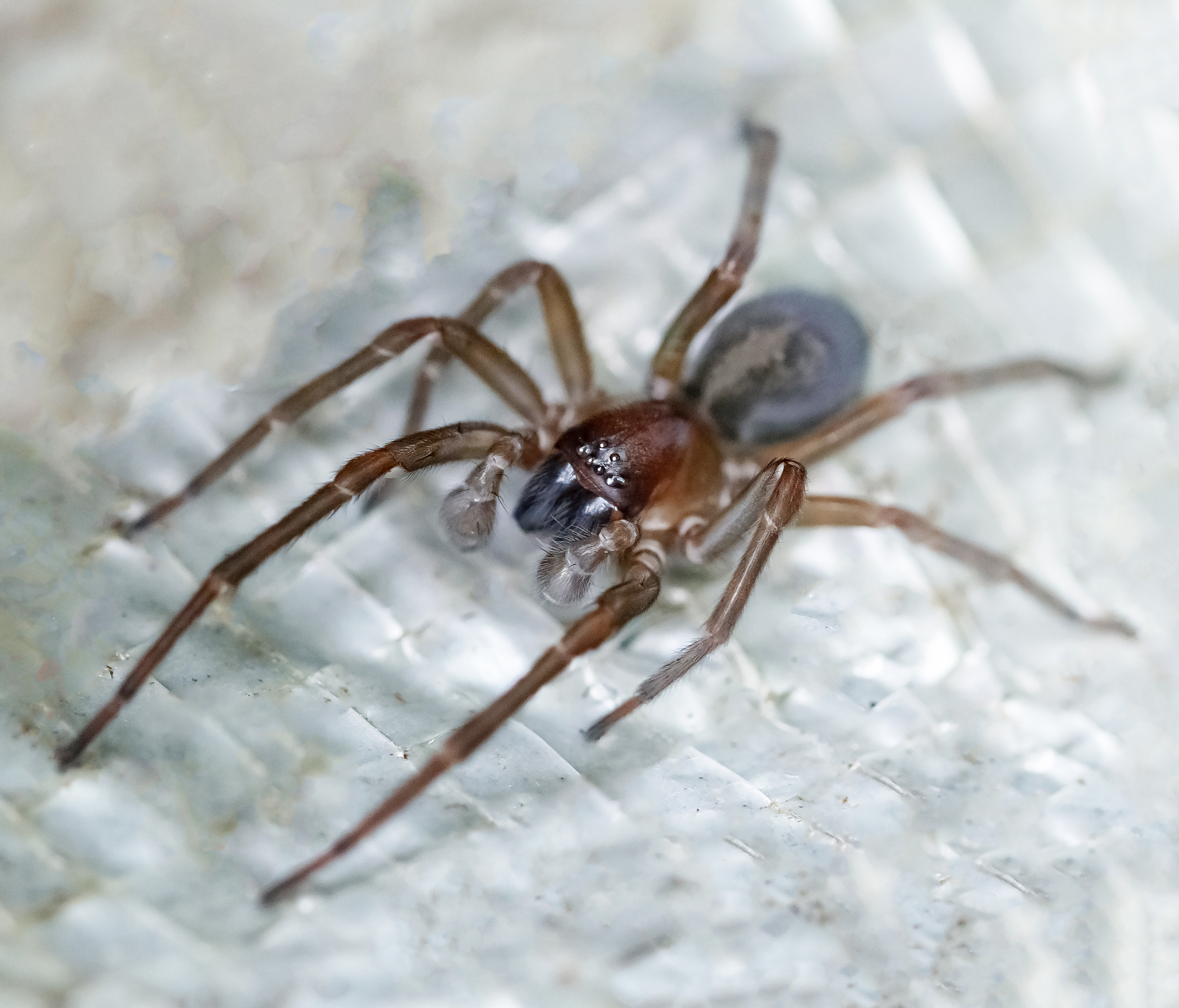
Male

Females of this species range from around 11–16 mm in body length, while males are slightly smaller and more slender, ranging from 8–10 mm. The spider is very dark in color with its primary shades being black, brown, dark red, and tan. The abdomen is rounded and has light yellow pale markings in a unique pattern that is often described as resembling a skull-like mask or delicate skeletal pattern.

== Habitat and distribution ==
Amaurobius ferox is usually found near man-made structures. The species prefers dark areas, such as underneath logs or inside cellars, and it often likes to live in moist, shaded crevices including underneath stones or dilapidated walls. In the spring, adult males can likely be found indoors while they wander in search of mates, but adult females can be found indoors or outdoors at any time of the year.

Amaurobius ferox is native to Europe and is distributed across the continent, but it has been introduced into all three countries of North America, as well as some Eastern European countries such as Turkey. The spider is rare in Northern Europe where temperatures are too low for its survival.

== Web ==
Amaurobius ferox is known to spin a cribellate web to facilitate prey capture and provide a protective retreat. The web is special because the silk has a unique woolly texture that is caused by extremely thin and extraordinarily sticky fibers, which gives the species its common-name, the black lace-weaver. A. ferox prefers to lay its webs on vertical surfaces, and the species most often creates a tangled mesh of threads surrounding a circular retreat leading into a crevice. When the web is newly spun, it is extremely sticky and has a lace-like appearance and faint blue color. The web is most often spun at night due to the species' nocturnal activity, but they are known to respond to any insect prey that gets stuck in the web during any time of day.

== Mating ==
In late summer and autumn, males wander in search of prospective females to mate with. Males often enter females’ webs and spin special silk threads to advertise their presence and attract the web's owner. Females lay their eggs in a white sac in a sheltered place, which she usually guards until the eggs have hatched. The egg sac is lens-shaped and ranges from about 7 to 15 mm in diameter. The egg sac contains anywhere from 60 to 180 eggs inside.

Females live for two years, while males only a few months.

== Behaviors ==
=== Dispersal behavior ===
The dispersal of A. ferox from the maternal nest does not occur at the same time for all the spiderlings within a clutch. A. ferox spiderlings disperse over an average period of one month, with half the clutch undergoing dispersal within the first three weeks. When half of a clutch is dispersed, remaining individuals are larger than those that dispersed.

The process of dispersal progresses through various stages, with the beginning and end stages transpiring very slowly, but quickening in the middle. Corresponding to the beginning of dispersal, the spiderlings display less group cohesion after their second molt. This decrease in group cohesion is concurrent with the significant amount of individual variability of developmental instar and body mass that is seen during dispersal.

As the spiderlings mature and begin to display predatory behavior, they also begin to display mutual aggressiveness to their siblings and this increases over the course of the dispersal process. As predatory behavior increases, prey is the largest driving factor for dispersal. When the maternal nest lacks the necessary amount of prey to feed the clutch, dispersal behavior is accelerated, and if the maternal nest has excess prey, the dispersal period is elongated.

The specific timing and organization regarding the various factors that affect dispersal such as the second molt, predation activity, prey quantity, mutual aggression, and reduction of group cohesion shows that dispersal behavior in A. ferox may have evolved as a developmental consequence of these other behaviors.

=== Molting behavior ===
During the social period, the molting behavior of A. ferox spiderlings is highly synchronized within the clutch, suggesting that social facilitation among group members mediates this synchronization. The molting period for grouped spiderlings is significantly shorter than the molting period of isolated spiderlings.

In A. ferox spiderlings, molting behavior in the social period is highly synchronized and occurs simultaneously, indicating that important social interactions between the spiderlings are required for the process to occur. This is evidenced by the fact that the molting period for grouped spiderlings is shorter than that of isolated spiderlings, indicating the need for both group presence and group communication.

Similar to the trophic egg consumption and matriphagy behaviors, this phenomenon might have adaptive values in the development of mutual tolerance among the siblings. This tolerance is mediated by decreasing individual variability in the development process and in the avoidance of cannibalism on molting individuals, helping maintain “fairness” in the clutch. This also serves to make the spiderlings’ matriphagous and cooperative prey capture behaviors as peaceful as possible in order to maximize the mother's direct fitness.

=== Maternal behaviors ===
A. ferox is a matriphagous species, meaning that the young devour their mother after hatching.

The maternal period of A. ferox is characterized by a series of different behavioral events. First, the mother undergoes a three-week incubation period during which she stays within extremely close proximity of her egg sac. At the end of the incubation period, the mother breaks open the egg sac allowing her 40 to 135 spiderlings to emerge into the world. Within their first few days of emerging, the mother lays trophic eggs for her offspring to consume. At the end of their first week, the spiderlings begin to molt, and finally, 1 or 2 days later when the molting process is complete, the spiderlings cannibalize their mother.

Observations have shown that the cannibalistic process is completed within just a few hours, in the course of which mothers and offspring appear to exchange stimulation. In particular, the mothers exhibit “solicitation” behavior which appears to activate and synchronize the young. The mother's attitude towards the young in terms of “solicitation”, tolerance, and predatory response appears to depend on her reproductive state. The attitude of the young towards their mother in terms of cannibalism, attraction, or flight has been shown to depend on their stage of development, but also on their mother's attitude.

==== Trophic eggs ====
Shortly after spiderlings emerge, their mother lays trophic eggs for her new offspring to consume. Studies show that trophic egg laying occurs approximately 29 hours after the emergence of young, and in most cases it occurs at night due to their nocturnal activity. The trophic eggs are smooth, yellow masses of indistinct eggs that, unlike regular eggs, are not wrapped in silk structures.

The roughly 29 hour period which begins from the clutch's emergence and ends with the eggs' consumption can be divided into three stages of behavioral activity.

===== First stage of trophic egg laying =====
The first stage occurs up to two to three hours before trophic egg laying and is characterized by a low level of activity. The spiderlings form a tight group, and their mother sits on top of them. She occasionally leaves them to deposit cribellate silk in the web.

===== Second stage of trophic egg laying =====
The second stage occurs in the last one to two hours before egg laying and is characterized by increasing activity of both the mother and her offspring, especially during the last 30 minutes. In this stage, the spiders exhibit direct mother-offspring behaviors that are rarely observed in other circumstances. At first, the mother displays a series of rotations above the group of young, surrounding the clutch with a loose network of ecribellate silk.

Next, the mother stops the rotational behavior and begins a slow drumming movement, characterized by alternating vertical movements of the pedipalps. This drumming behavior is focused on the area occupied by the clutch.

At the end of this stage, the mother sometimes becomes immobile, only briefly moving again to resume the slow drumming behavior from before. After this, spiderlings show an increase in locomotive activity over short distances and exhibit a cohesive behavior that consists of the spiderlings crowding together with some individuals even climbing on top of the others. Then, the clutch begins to migrate to the mother, and, after they eventually settle on the ventral side of the mother's opisthosoma, they become immobile. During this whole process, despite their close proximity and physical contact, the spiderlings do not exhibit agonistic behavior to their siblings.

===== Third stage of trophic egg laying =====
The third stage of trophic egg laying correlates with oviposition. The mother raises her opisthosoma, and oviposition is commenced as she begins a series of slow contractions that last around five minutes. As soon as the trophic eggs are released, the young surround them to immediately devour. During their meal, their opisthosomae begin to swell very fast and synchronously among all the spiderlings. All of the spiderlings take part in eating the mothers’ trophic eggs, and data suggest that all individuals within a clutch eat approximately the same quantity of eggs. Once the entire mass of eggs is eaten, the spiderlings’ opisthosomae are at the maximum size, and they then immediately leave to disperse inside the web.

Eating trophic eggs provides the spiderlings a considerable benefit in terms of weight, as evidence of the opisthosoma's swelling and the fact that after consuming the trophic eggs, the spiderlings more than double in weight. Further, clutches that do not receive trophic eggs exhibit delays in molting, lower survival rates, and more cannibalism between siblings, indicating that trophic eggs are a required step of the natural developmental process.

Although intake of trophic eggs is necessary for the natural development of the spiderlings, it is not a requirement for matriphagy. However, similar to the effect had on molting, spiderlings that do not consume trophic eggs exhibit delays in matriphagy and also lower survival rates. This indicates that the positive effects of matriphagy are not enough to compensate for the previous weight loss due to the lack of trophic eggs. Interestingly, mothers are able to supervise the allocation of trophic eggs based on her and her offspring's state of physiology. For example, mothers separated from their offspring will not lay trophic eggs, and similarly, a mother which has recently laid trophic eggs will not do so again even when exposed to spiderlings who have yet to receive them. Likewise, a mother ready to lay trophic eggs will not even when she is in the presence of spiderlings that have already eaten trophic eggs. This shows that there are important mother-offspring interactions that mediate the trophic egg behavior.

== Bites ==
This species has been known to bite people. In one of the most detailed verified instances of an A. ferox bite, the victim immediately experienced dull pain of a very mild intensity, which, according to the victim, was similar to a wasp sting. The pain reached its maximum intensity after two hours and disappeared completely after 12 hours. Doctors confirmed an area of swelling approximately 6 mm in diameter at the site as well as an associated circle of redness that spanned 30 mm in diameter. No fang marks were visible on the victim's skin, but a tetanus vaccine was administered, and no further treatment was needed. After one week, dark red bumps with many small blisters appeared around the bite site, but after one more week the skin completely recovered.

== Bibliography ==
- Preston-Mafham, Ken (1998). Spiders: Compact Study Guide and Identifier. Angus Books. ISBN 978-1-904594-93-2.
