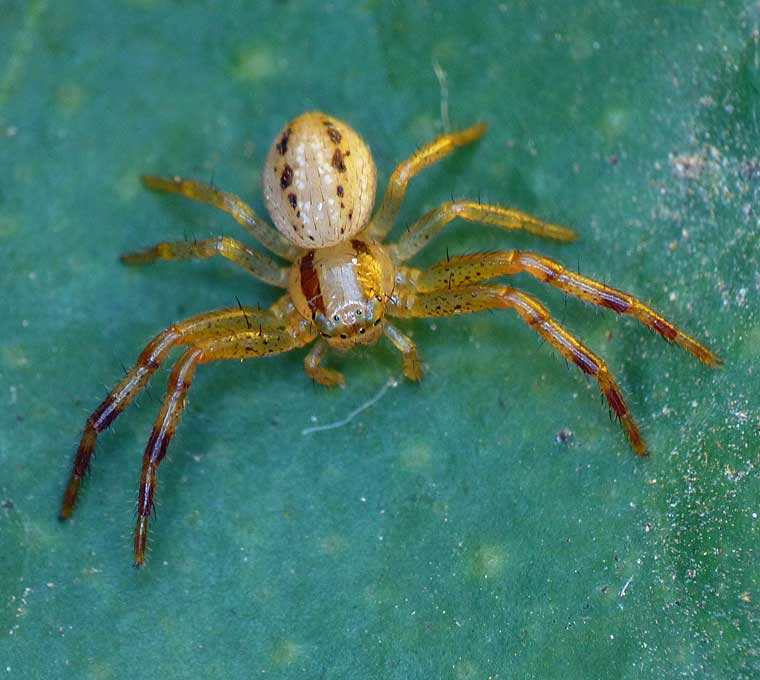

Scientific classification
- Domain: Eukaryota
- Kingdom: Animalia
- Phylum: Arthropoda
- Subphylum: Chelicerata
- Class: Arachnida
- Order: Araneae
- Infraorder: Araneomorphae
- Family: Thomisidae
- Genus: Australomisidia
- Species: A. cruentata

Binomial name
- Australomisidia cruentata L.Koch, 1874

Synonyms
- Xysticus bilimbatus

= Australomisidia cruentata =

Species of spider

Australomisidia cruentata, one of the crab spiders, is a small spider found in Australia. The body length of the female is up to 5 mm, the male 3 mm. An ambush predator, often seen on flowers in the Pultenaea group of egg and bacon plants, belonging to the pea family. The egg sac is also laid on the flowers. Petals being fastened with silk in a chamber. The spider stays with the eggs, probably still hunting from the entrance of the retreat, with the egg sac nearby. Prey is small flying insects. The genus Australomisidia was created in 2014, the word being a combination of Australia and Thomisidae, the crab spiders.

== See also ==
- List of Thomisidae species
