= Amaurobius pavesii =

Scientific classification
- Domain: Eukaryota
- Kingdom: Animalia
- Phylum: Arthropoda
- Subphylum: Chelicerata
- Class: Arachnida
- Order: Araneae
- Infraorder: Araneomorphae
- Family: Amaurobiidae
- Genus: Amaurobius
- Species: A. pavesii

Binomial name
- Amaurobius pavesii Pesarini, 1991

Species of spider

Amaurobius pavesii is a species of spider in the family Amaurobiidae, found in Italy.
