= Amaurobius occidentalis =

Scientific classification
- Kingdom: Animalia
- Phylum: Arthropoda
- Subphylum: Chelicerata
- Class: Arachnida
- Order: Araneae
- Infraorder: Araneomorphae
- Family: Amaurobiidae
- Genus: Amaurobius
- Species: A. occidentalis

Binomial name
- Amaurobius occidentalis Simon, 1893

Species of spider

Amaurobius occidentalis is a species of spider in the family Amaurobiidae, found in south-west Europe (Portugal, Spain and France).
