= Amaurobius obustus =

Scientific classification
- Domain: Eukaryota
- Kingdom: Animalia
- Phylum: Arthropoda
- Subphylum: Chelicerata
- Class: Arachnida
- Order: Araneae
- Infraorder: Araneomorphae
- Family: Amaurobiidae
- Genus: Amaurobius
- Species: A. obustus

Binomial name
- Amaurobius obustus L. Koch, 1868

Species of spider

Amaurobius obustus is a species of spider in the family Amaurobiidae, found in Europe.
