= Amaurobius cretaensis =

Conservation status
- Vulnerable (IUCN 3.1)

Scientific classification
- Kingdom: Animalia
- Phylum: Arthropoda
- Subphylum: Chelicerata
- Class: Arachnida
- Order: Araneae
- Infraorder: Araneomorphae
- Family: Amaurobiidae
- Genus: Amaurobius
- Species: A. cretaensis

Binomial name
- Amaurobius cretaensis Wunderlich, 1995

Species of spider

Amaurobius cretaensis is a species of spider in the family Amaurobiidae, found in Crete.
