= Trophic egg =

Egg whose function is nutrition

A trophic egg is an egg whose function is not reproduction but nutrition; In essence, the trophic egg serves as food for offspring hatched from viable eggs. In most species that produce them, a trophic egg is usually an unfertilised egg. The production of trophic eggs has been observed in a highly diverse range of species, including fish, amphibians, spiders and insects. The function is not limited to any particular level of parental care, but occurs in some sub-social species of insects, the spider A. ferox, and a few other species like the frogs Leptodactylus fallax and Oophaga, and the catfish Bagrus meridionalis. Trophic eggs have also been documented in snakeheads (family Channidae). In Channa andrao and C. gachua, females have been observed provisioning newly hatched larvae with unfertilised eggs, which are consumed by the brood. Observations of several species in the C. gachua group suggest that trophic-egg provisioning may be widespread within this lineage.

Parents of some species deliver trophic eggs directly to their offspring, whereas some other species simply produce the trophic eggs after laying the viable eggs; they then leave the trophic eggs where the viable offspring are likely to find them. The mackerel sharks present the most extreme example of proximity between reproductive eggs and trophic eggs; their viable offspring feed on trophic eggs in utero.

Despite the diversity of species and life strategies in which trophic eggs occur, all trophic egg functions are similarly derived from similar ancestral functions, which once amounted to the sacrifice of potential future offspring in order to provide food for the survival of rival (usually earlier) offspring. In more derived examples the trophic eggs are not viable, being neither fertilised, nor even fully formed in some cases, so they do not represent actual potential offspring, although they still represent parental investment corresponding to the amount of food it took to produce them.

== Morphology ==
Trophic eggs are not always morphologically distinct from normal reproductive eggs; however if there is no physical distinction there tends to be some kind of specialised behaviour in the way that trophic eggs are delivered by the parents.

In some beetles, trophic eggs are paler in colour and softer in texture than reproductive eggs, with a smoother surface on the chorion. It has also been found that trophic eggs in ants have a less pronounced reticulate pattern on the chorion.

The morphological differences may arise due to the fact that mothers invest less energy in the production of trophic eggs than viable eggs.

=== Summary of cross-species morphology and behaviour ===
	Species (family)	Trophic eggs (TE) morphologically distinct	Specialised behaviour in delivery of TEs
Vertebrates	Frogs (Dendrobatidae, Leptodactylidae, Hylidae)	No	Yes (repeated TE laying)
Vertebrates	Catfish (Bagrus meridionalis, Bagridae)	?	Yes (repeated TE laying)
Vertebrates	Coelacanth (Latimeria chalumnae, Coelacanthidae)	Yes	Yes (TEs supplied continually in oviduct)
Insects	Adomerus triguttulus (Cydnidae)	Yes	Yes (repeated TE laying)
Insects	Anurogryllus muticus (Gryllidae)	Yes	Yes (repeated TE laying)
Eusocial insects	Various ants (Formicidae); queen-produced eggs	Yes	Yes (delivery to offspring)
Eusocial insects	Various ants (Formicidae); worker-produced eggs	Yes	Yes (delivery to offspring)
Other invertebrates	Several polychaete worms (Spionidae)	Yes	?
Other invertebrates	Amaurobius ferox (Amaurobiidae)	?	Yes (laid after offspring hatch)
Other invertebrates	Coelotes terrestris (Agelenidae)	?	Yes (laid after offspring hatch)
Other invertebrates	Several prosobranch gastropods (Buccinidae, Calyptraeidae, Muricidae)	Yes	Yes

== Ecology ==
=== Adaptive plasticity ===
The behaviour of trophic egg-laying species depends highly on their environment and can be modified via adaptive plasticity in response to environmental variation. The ratio of trophic to viable eggs is determined by the availability of resources, although the absolute number of trophic eggs does not always change. The production of fewer viable eggs ensures that each hatched nymph will have a larger provision of trophic eggs; and therefore gives each individual an enhanced chance of survival when external resources are limited. Females can adaptively adjust the egg ratio in response to environmental drivers prior to oviposition.

=== Reproductive success ===
When resources are limited, the presence of trophic eggs greatly increases the maturation and survival rates of offspring. When other suitable sources of food are plentiful, feeding on trophic eggs generally has little effect on brood success. However, there are some species such as the subsocial burrower bug Canthophorus niveimarginatus (Heteroptera: Cydnidae) whose offspring cannot survive at all without the provision of trophic eggs. The nymphs starve to death because trophic eggs are the only thing they are able to feed on.

Sibling cannibalism, common in many spider species, is not affected by the proportion of trophic eggs, since viable eggs are oviposited and hatch synchronously, before trophic eggs are laid. In the spider Amaurobius ferox, trophic eggs are laid the day after spiderlings emerge from their egg sac. The mother's reproductive behaviour is modified by the behaviour of her offspring, and their presence inhibits the second generation of eggs from maturing; instead they are released as infertile trophic eggs. Converting the second generation into food for the first ultimately boosts the mother's reproductive success.

=== Evolutionary theory ===
There are no concrete explanations for the evolution of trophic eggs. The two main conflicting arguments are:

- They are an evolved maternal phenotype
- They are simply a failed generation of offspring, produced as a result of reproductive stochasticity.

If they have evolved (and are now distinct) from functionless by-products of failed reproduction, then trophic eggs should be more easily available and provide more nutrients to the offspring than their evolutionary predecessors. There seems to be clear evidence of this adaptation in many species. This can be seen in mothers making an effort to distribute trophic eggs to their offspring; or eggs which are specialised for the nutritional needs of the offspring. However, in many species, the two types of egg are indistinguishable. Various hypotheses could potentially be tested to determine whether trophic eggs are indeed an evolved phenotype.

It has been suggested that trophic egg-laying evolved as a consequence of limited egg size, since larger eggs with more nutrient supply would require the mother to have a larger body size. Thus, the production of more eggs, some of which are not intended to reach maturity. It is relatively simple for the mother to adjust the ratio of fertilised to non-fertilised eggs, in response to environmental conditions.

An alternative to trophic egg-laying is sibling cannibalism; however this requires the mother to regulate the synchrony of hatching times. However, in this case eggs which are not eaten would continue to develop. If it is difficult for the mother to achieve this synchrony, trophic eggs are a sensible alternative in ensuring that the offspring that hatch will be fed sufficiently.

== Examples ==
- Trophic egg-laying is found relatively commonly in sub-social insects, one of the most commonly studied being the bug Adomerus triguttulus (Heteroptera: Cydnidae). Nymphs are provisioned with nettle seeds, and the ratio of trophic eggs to viable ones is higher when seeds are less well-developed or in lower quantities, indicating that they are filling the deficit of the alternate food source.
- Worker bees in many eusocial stingless bee species, Paratrigona subnuda, have ovarian development and can lay trophic eggs within the brood combs that are later eaten by the queen bee and her progeny, including workers and future queen larvae.
- Many ant species produce trophic eggs, although in the case of Pachycondyla apicalis (Formicidae: Ponerinae) the trophic eggs are laid by workers and offered to the queen rather than to developing offspring. However this depends on transmission of pheromones from the queen, since workers lacking contact with the queen may instead start to lay reproductive eggs.
- Some spider species lay a batch of trophic eggs the day after the viable offspring have emerged. This precise timing is based on close interactions between the mother and her offspring, including rotating and drumming behaviour by the mother, which stimulates the spiderlings to climb onto her body at the exact time of release of the trophic eggs. Consumption of trophic eggs can more than double the body weight of the spiderlings, greatly increasing their chances of survival.
- Some species of frogs produce trophic eggs in the same location as their reproductive eggs. Species such as Oophaga (formerly included in Dendrobates) lay both types of eggs within water-filled tree holes, bromeliad reservoirs, and pitcher plants; where the trophic eggs provide nutrition for the emerging tadpoles. Another frog species, Leptodactylus fallax, shows extraordinarily high levels of parental care, with both parents remaining near the burrow, and females feeding each brood a total of 10,000–25,000 trophic eggs, their only source of nutrition.
- Intrauterine cannibalism is common in the viviparous shark order Lamniformes (commonly known as mackerel sharks). This strategy is effective in applying the mother's available resources to production of the optimal number of offspring viable in the ecological niche of a large marine predator. Such cannibalism may take the form of oophagy (eating sibling eggs) or adelphophagy (literally, eating one's brother, but in context meaning the eating of one's siblings). In either form intrauterine cannibalism certainly minimises waste of nutrient resources, such as surplus eggs in the mother's reproductive system, and it prevents the development of excessive numbers of small offspring, rather than a small number of vigorously competitive young sharks. It has been speculated to ensure the survival of only the fittest offspring. However, that speculation has no substance, simply because there is no systematic genetic difference, and hence no systematic difference in genetic fitness, between embryos produced at various times and places in the mother's reproductive system. An embryo that in genetic terms is poorly fit, but nearly mature, would have no difficulty in eating a fit egg or much younger sibling embryo, no matter how genetically fit they might be.
