= Amaurobius pallidus =

Scientific classification
- Kingdom: Animalia
- Phylum: Arthropoda
- Subphylum: Chelicerata
- Class: Arachnida
- Order: Araneae
- Infraorder: Araneomorphae
- Family: Amaurobiidae
- Genus: Amaurobius
- Species: A. pallidus

Binomial name
- Amaurobius pallidus L. Koch, 1868

Synonyms
- Ciniflo pallidus (L. Koch, 1868)

Species of spider

Amaurobius pallidus is a species of spider in the family Amaurobiidae, found in Southeastern Europe to Georgia.
