= Heathi =

Heathi may refer to:

- M. heathi
  - Mabuya heathi, Schmidt & Inger, 1951, the Brazilian mabuya, a skink species in the genus Mabuya

== Subspecies ==
- Drasteria hudsonica heathi, a subspecies in the species Drasteria hudsonica

== See also ==
- Heath, a disambiguation page
