= Australomisidia =

Scientific classification
- Domain: Eukaryota
- Kingdom: Animalia
- Phylum: Arthropoda
- Subphylum: Chelicerata
- Class: Arachnida
- Order: Araneae
- Infraorder: Araneomorphae
- Family: Thomisidae
- Genus: Australomisidia; Szymkowiak, 2014

Type species
- Australomisidia pilula

Species
- 8, see text

Genus of spiders

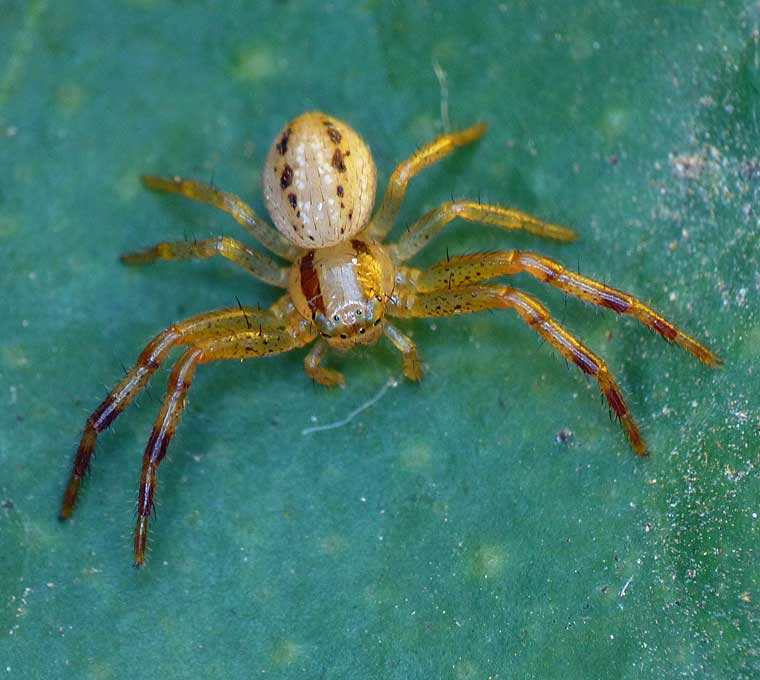

Australomisidia is a genus of spiders in the family Thomisidae. It was first described in 2014 by Szymkowiak. As of 2017, it contains 8 species, all from Australia.

== Species ==
Australomisidia comprises the following species:

- Australomisidia cruentata (L. Koch, 1874)
- Australomisidia elegans (L. Koch, 1876)
- Australomisidia ergandros (Evans, 1995)
- Australomisidia inornata (L. Koch, 1876)
- Australomisidia kangarooblaszaki (Szymkowiak, 2008)
- Australomisidia pilula (L. Koch, 1867)
- Australomisidia rosea (L. Koch, 1875)
- Australomisidia socialis (Main, 1988)
