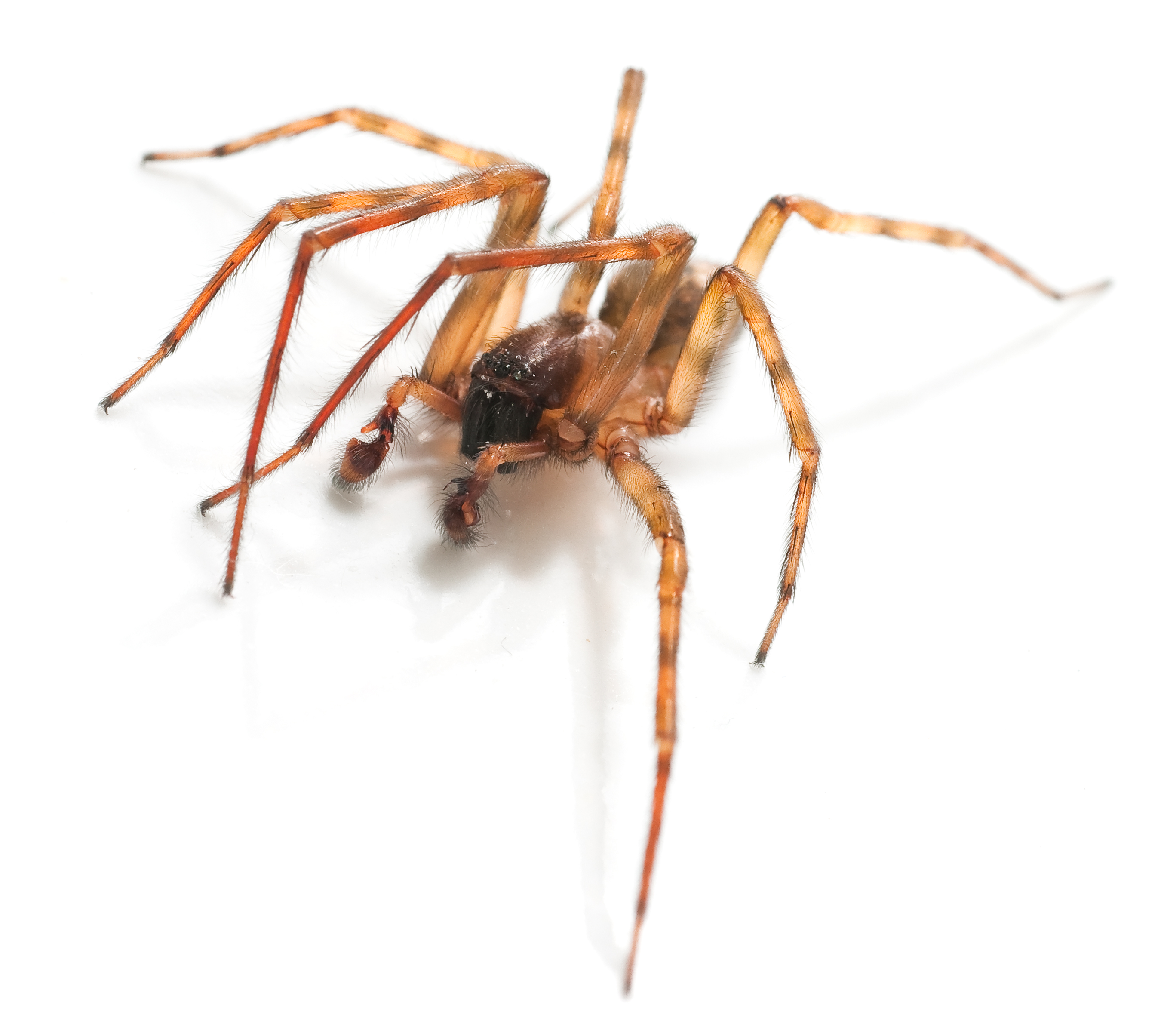
- Amaurobius similis (male)

Scientific classification
- Kingdom: Animalia
- Phylum: Arthropoda
- Subphylum: Chelicerata
- Class: Arachnida
- Order: Araneae
- Infraorder: Araneomorphae
- Family: Amaurobiidae
- Genus: Amaurobius; C. L. Koch, 1837

Type species
- Aranea atrox De Geer, 1778

Species
- 69, see text

Synonyms
- Walmus Chamberlin, 1947

= Amaurobius =

Genus of spiders

Amaurobius is a genus of tangled nest spiders that was first described by Carl Ludwig Koch in 1837.

== Species ==
As of October 2026 it contains sixty-nine species:

- A. agastus (Chamberlin, 1947) – USA
- A. annulatus (Kulczyński, 1906) – Croatia, Montenegro
- A. antipovae Marusik & Kovblyuk, 2004 – Caucasus (Russia, Georgia)
- A. ausobskyi Thaler & Knoflach, 1998 – Greece
- A. barbaricus Leech, 1972 – USA
- A. barbarus Simon, 1911 – Algeria, Spain
- A. borealis Emerton, 1909 – USA, Canada
- A. candia Thaler & Knoflach, 2002 – Greece (Crete)
- A. caucasicus Marusik, Otto & Japoshvili, 2020 – Georgia
- A. cerberus Fage, 1931 – Spain
- A. corruptus Leech, 1972 – USA
- A. crassipalpis Canestrini & Pavesi, 1870 – Germany, Switzerland, Italy
- A. cretaensis Wunderlich, 1995 – Greece (Crete)
- A. danba Lin & Li, 2024 – China
- A. deelemanae Thaler & Knoflach, 1995 – Greece, Crete
- A. diablo Leech, 1972 – USA
- A. distortus Leech, 1972 – USA
- A. dorotheae (Chamberlin, 1947) – USA
- A. drenskii Kratochvíl, 1934 – Bosnia and Herzegovina
- A. erberi (Keyserling, 1863) – Canary Is., Europe, Turkey, Caucasus
- A. fenestralis (Ström, 1768) (type) – Europe to Central Asia
- A. ferox (Walckenaer, 1830) – Europe, Turkey. Introduced to Canada, USA, Mexico
- A. festae Caporiacco, 1934 – Libya
- A. galeritus Leech, 1972 – USA
- A. geminus Thaler & Knoflach, 2002 – Greece (Crete)
- A. guangwushanensis Wang, Irfan, Zhou & Zhang, 2023 – China
- A. hagiellus (Chamberlin, 1947) – USA
- A. heathi (Chamberlin, 1947) – USA
- A. hercegovinensis Kulczyński, 1915 – Bosnia and Herzegovina, Montenegro
- A. intermedius Leech, 1972 – USA
- A. izimirensis Coşar & Danışman, 2026 – Turkey
- A. jugorum L. Koch, 1868 – Europe
- A. kratochvili Miller, 1938 – Croatia, Albania
- A. latebrosus Simon, 1874 – France (Corsica)
- A. latescens (Chamberlin, 1919) – USA
- A. leechi Brignoli, 1983 – USA
- A. lesbius Bosmans, 2011 – Greece
- A. longipes Thaler & Knoflach, 1995 – Greece
- A. mathetes (Chamberlin, 1947) – USA
- A. mephisto (Chamberlin, 1947) – USA
- A. minor Kulczyński, 1915 – Eastern Europe
- A. minorca Barrientos & Febrer, 2018 – Spain (Menorca)
- A. minutus Leech, 1972 – USA
- A. obustus L. Koch, 1868 – Europe
- A. occidentalis Simon, 1893 – Portugal, Spain, France
- A. ossa Thaler & Knoflach, 1993 – Greece
- A. pallidus L. Koch, 1868 – Southeastern Europe to Georgia
- A. palomar Leech, 1972 – USA
- A. paon Thaler & Knoflach, 1993 – Greece
- A. pavesii Pesarini, 1991 – Italy
- A. pelops Thaler & Knoflach, 1991 – Greece
- A. pesarinii Ballarin & Pantini, 2017 – Italy
- A. phaeacus Thaler & Knoflach, 1998 – Albania, Macedonia, Greece
- A. prosopidus Leech, 1972 – USA
- A. ruffoi Thaler, 1990 – Italy
- A. scopolii Thorell, 1871 – France, Italy, Slovenia
- A. similis (Blackwall, 1861) – Europe, Caucasus. Introduced to North America
- A. songi Zhang, Wang & Zhang, 2018 – China
- A. spinatus Zhang, Wang & Zhang, 2018 – China
- A. strandi Charitonov, 1937 – Greece, Bulgaria, Ukraine
- A. tamalpais Leech, 1972 – USA
- A. transversus Leech, 1972 – USA
- A. triangularis Leech, 1972 – USA
- A. tristis L. Koch, 1875 – Eritrea
- A. tulare Leech, 1972 – USA
- A. vachoni Hubert, 1965 – Spain
- A. vexans Leech, 1972 – USA
- A. wulongdongensis Wang, Irfan, Zhou & Zhang, 2023 – China
- A. yaan Lin & Li, 2024 – China
