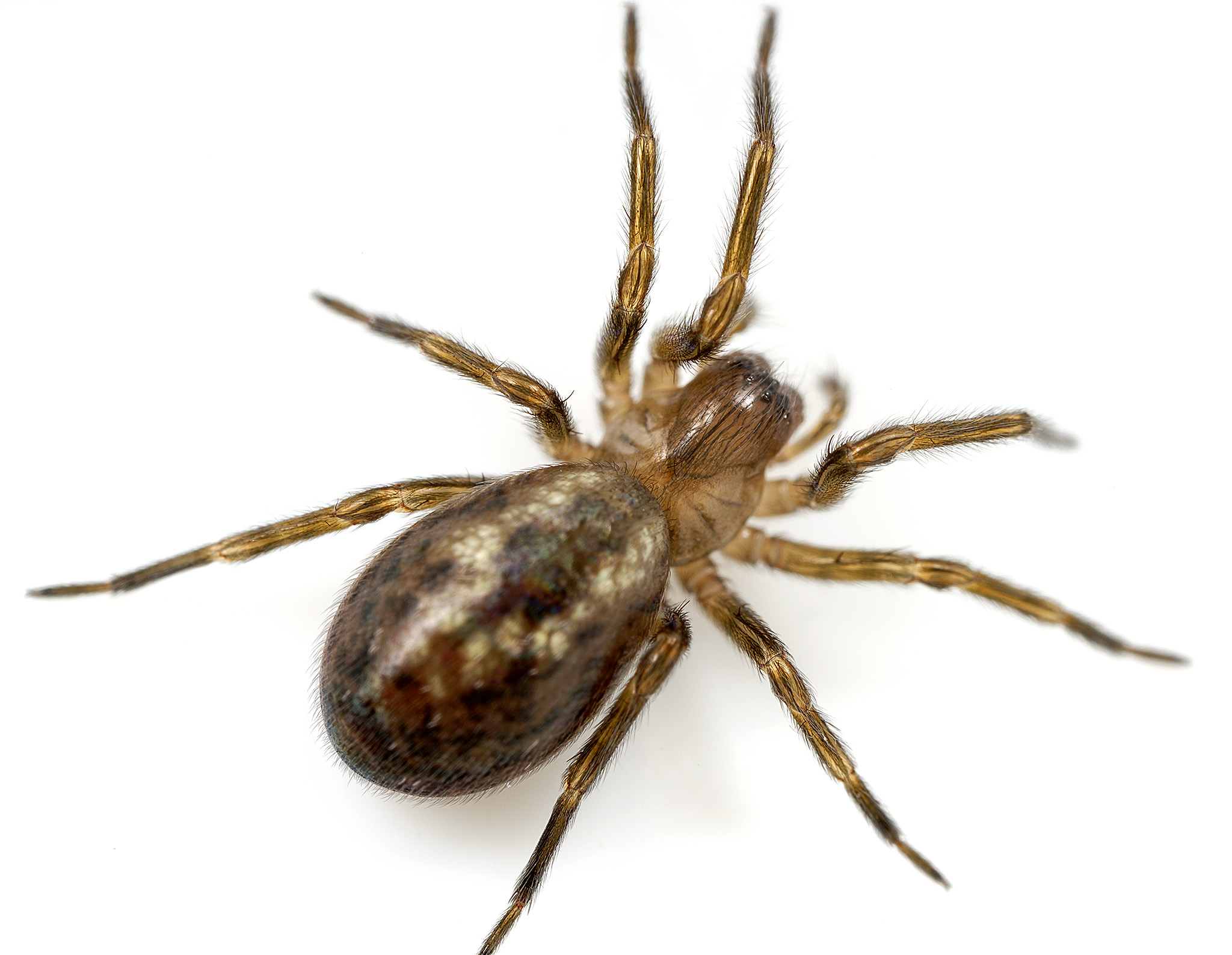
- A premolt Amaurobius similis

Scientific classification
- Domain: Eukaryota
- Kingdom: Animalia
- Phylum: Arthropoda
- Subphylum: Chelicerata
- Class: Arachnida
- Order: Araneae
- Infraorder: Araneomorphae
- Family: Amaurobiidae
- Genus: Amaurobius
- Species: A. similis

Binomial name
- Amaurobius similis (Blackwall, 1861)

Synonyms
- Ciniflo similis Blackwall, 1861; Callobius alaskanus Chamberlin, 1947; Amaurobius alaskanus (Chamberlin, 1947)

= Amaurobius similis =

Species of spider

Amaurobius similis is a species of spider in the family Amaurobiidae. It is one of at least two common spiders found in houses known as lace-webbed spiders. The specific name similis is based on its similarity to the species Amaurobius fenestralis. Both are often found near windows, hence the specific name of A. fenestralis.

== Description ==
Mature males have a body length of 6–8 mm, females 9–12 mm. The carapace is dark reddish-brown in colour, with a darker head area. The top of the abdomen has a dark wedge shaped marking, edged with yellow towards the anterior. The legs are coloured as the carapace, and bear darker annulations.

The species is very visually similar to A. fenestralis and, while A. similis tends to be larger and darker in colouration when mature, microscopic examination of the genitalia is necessary for reliable identification of the two species.

== Distribution and habitat ==
Amaurobius similis has a Holarctic distribution, and is found throughout Europe and the Caucasus. It has also been introduced to North America.

The species is found primarily in or around buildings, where it spins a web in holes in walls, fences and window frames. It is also less commonly found under bark in more natural habitats, such as woods.
