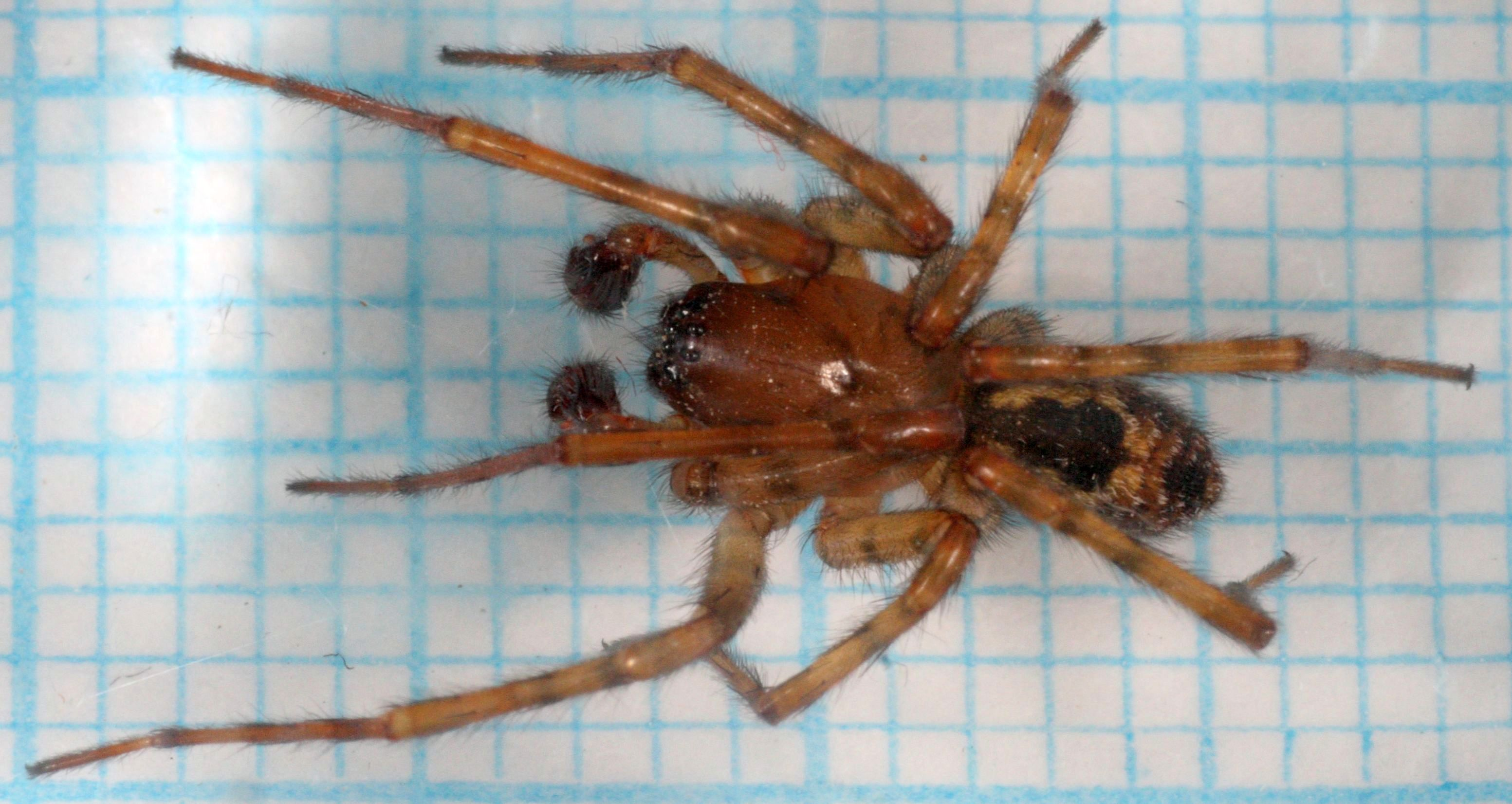
- Male

Scientific classification
- Kingdom: Animalia
- Phylum: Arthropoda
- Subphylum: Chelicerata
- Class: Arachnida
- Order: Araneae
- Infraorder: Araneomorphae
- Family: Amaurobiidae
- Genus: Amaurobius
- Species: A. fenestralis

Binomial name
- Amaurobius fenestralis (Ström, 1768)

= Amaurobius fenestralis =

Species of spider

Amaurobius fenestralis is a species of spider in the family Amaurobiidae.

It is one of at least two common spiders found in houses known as lace-webbed spider, the other being Amaurobius similis. The specific name similis is based on its similarity to A. fenestralis. Both are often found near windows, hence the specific name of A. fenestralis. The two species are difficult to distinguish: A. fenestralis tends to be smaller and lighter in colouration when an adult. Both species have V-shaped markings on their abdomens, with A. fenestralis usually having two or three, and A. similis four. Examination of the genitalia may be needed for precise identification. This spider has been seen preying on another spider, Steatoda nobilis in areas around the UK.
