= Dmitry Kharitonov =

Russian arachnologist (1896–1970)

Dmitry Evstratievich Kharitonov
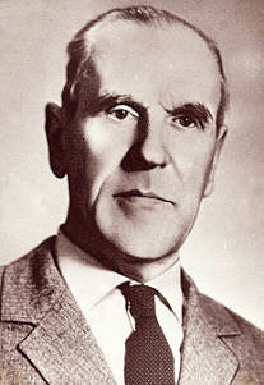
- Kharitonov in 1970
- Born: 1896
- Died: 1970 (aged 73–74)
- Citizenship: Russia
- Known for: Katalog der russischen Spinnen (1932, 1936)
- Scientific career
- Fields: Arachnology
- Workplaces: Perm State University
- Author abbrev. (zoology): Charitonov

Dmitry Evstratievich Kharitonov (Russian: Дмитрий Евстратьевич Харитонов; 1896–1970), also spelt Charitonov, was the first native Russian arachnologist. In 1916 he founded the arachnological school of Perm State University, the oldest arachnology research group in Russia. The culmination of his work was the comprehensive Katalog der russischen Spinnen (en: Catalogue of Russian spiders), published bilingually in 1932, with an addition published in 1936. He grew up under the supervision of Dmitry Mikhailovich Fedotov, an arachnologist from St. Petersburg. One of his postgraduates, T.S. Mkheidze, has been working in Georgia since the 1930s.
