= List of Liocranidae species =

This page lists all described species of the spider family Liocranidae accepted by the World Spider Catalog as of February 2021:

== A ==
=== Agraecina ===
Agraecina Simon, 1932

- A. agadirensis Lecigne, Lips, Moutaouakil & Oger, 2020 — Morocco
- A. canariensis Wunderlich, 1992 — Canary Is.
- A. cristiani (Georgescu, 1989) — Romania
- A. hodna Bosmans, 1999 — Algeria
- A. lineata (Simon, 1878) (type) — Western Mediterranean to Kazakhstan
- A. rutilia (Simon, 1897) — Sierra Leone
- A. salsicola Bosmans & Boubakri, 2020 — Tunisia
- A. scupiensis Deltshev, 2016 — North Macedonia, Greece

=== Agroeca ===
Agroeca

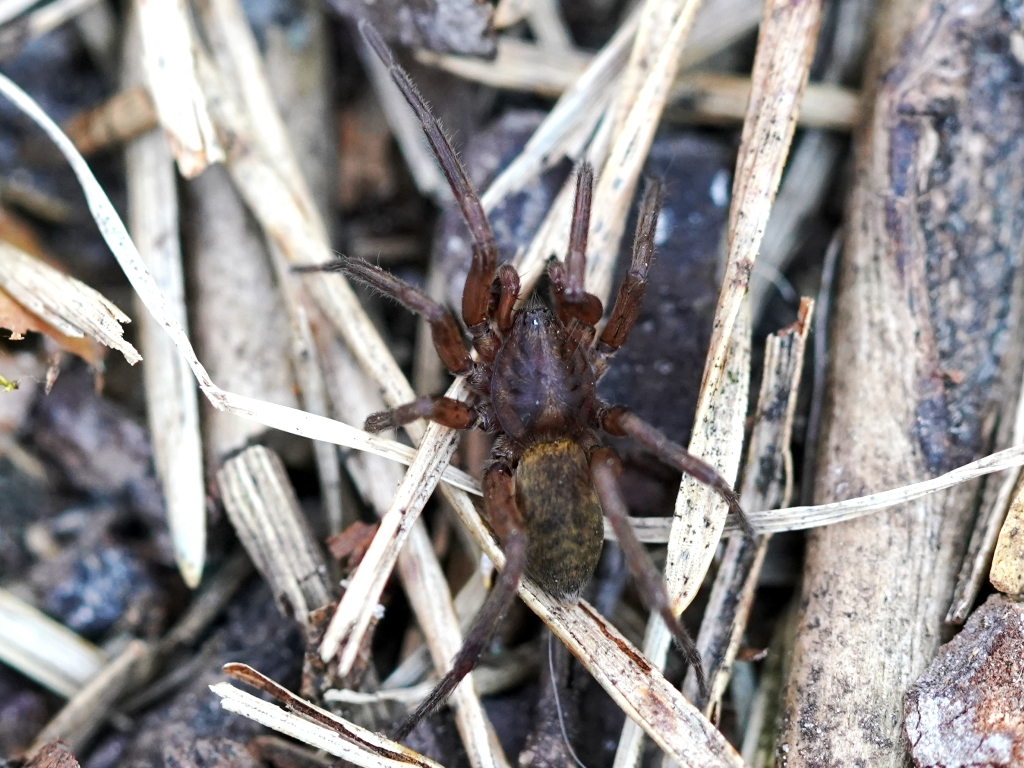
Agroeca brunnea

Agroeca Westring, 1861

- A. agrestis Ponomarev, 2007 — Kazakhstan
- A. annulipes Simon, 1878 — Spain, France (Corsica), Italy (Sardinia), Morocco, Algeria
- A. aureoplumata Keyserling, 1879 — Colombia
- A. batangensis Mu, Jin & Zhang, 2019 — China
- A. bonghwaensis Seo, 2011 — Korea
- A. brunnea (Blackwall, 1833) — Europe, Turkey, Russia (Europe to Far East), China, Japan
- A. coreana Namkung, 1989 — Russia (Far East), China, Korea, Japan
- A. cuprea Menge, 1873 — Europe, Caucasus, Russia (Europe to South Siberia), Iran, Central Asia
- A. debilis O. Pickard-Cambridge, 1885 — China (Yarkand)
- A. dentigera Kulczyński, 1913 — Europe, Turkey, China
- A. dubiosissima (Strand, 1908) — Peru
- A. flavens O. Pickard-Cambridge, 1885 — China (Yarkand)
- A. gangotrae Biswas & Roy, 2008 — India
- A. guttulata Simon, 1897 — Central Asia
- A. inopina O. Pickard-Cambridge, 1886 — Europe, Algeria
- A. istia de Biurrun & Barrientos, 2021 — Spain
- A. kamurai Hayashi, 1992 — China, Japan
- A. kastoni Chamberlin & Ivie, 1944 — USA
- A. lata Mu, Jin & Zhang, 2019 — China
- A. lusatica (L. Koch, 1875) — Europe, Russia (Europe to South Siberia), Kazakhstan, Iran
- A. maculata L. Koch, 1879 — Russia (Europe to Far East), Kazakhstan
- A. maghrebensis Bosmans, 1999 — Morocco, Algeria, Tunisia
- A. mainlingensis Mu, Jin & Zhang, 2019 — China
- A. makarovae Esyunin, 2008 — Russia (Europe)
- A. minuta Banks, 1895 — USA
- A. mongolica Schenkel, 1936 — Mongolia, China, Korea
- A. montana Hayashi, 1986 — Russia (Far East), China, Korea, Japan
- A. nigra Mu, Jin & Zhang, 2019 — China
- A. ornata Banks, 1892 — USA, Canada, Russia (Middle Siberia to Far East)
- A. parva Bosmans, 2011 — Greece, Turkey, Israel
- A. pratensis Emerton, 1890 — USA, Canada
- A. proxima (O. Pickard-Cambridge, 1871) (type) — Europe, Turkey, Russia (Europe to South Siberia)
- A. spinifera Kaston, 1938 — USA
- A. trivittata (Keyserling, 1887) — USA
- A. tumida Mu, Jin & Zhang, 2019 — China

=== Andromma ===
Andromma Simon, 1893

- A. aethiopicum Simon, 1893 (type) — Ethiopia
- A. anochetorum Simon, 1909 — Congo, East Africa
- A. bouvieri Fage, 1936 — Kenya
- A. raffrayi Simon, 1899 — South Africa
  - A. r. inhacorense Lessert, 1936 — Mozambique

=== Apostenus ===
Apostenus Westring, 1851

- A. algericus Bosmans, 1999 — Algeria
- A. annulipedes Wunderlich, 1987 — Canary Is.
- A. annulipes Caporiacco, 1935 — Karakorum
- A. californicus Ubick & Vetter, 2005 — USA
- A. crespoi Lissner, 2017 — Portugal
- A. ducati Bennett, Copley & Copley, 2013 — USA, Canada
- A. fuscus Westring, 1851 (type) — Europe
- A. gomerensis Wunderlich, 1992 — Canary Is.
- A. grancanariensis Wunderlich, 1992 — Canary Is.
- A. humilis Simon, 1932 — Portugal, Spain, France
- A. maroccanus Bosmans, 1999 — Morocco
- A. ochraceus Hadjissarantos, 1940 — Greece
- A. palmensis Wunderlich, 1992 — Canary Is.
- † A. arnoldorum Wunderlich, 2004
- † A. bigibber Wunderlich, 2004
- † A. spinimanus Koch and Berendt, 1854

=== Arabelia ===
Arabelia Bosselaers, 2009

- A. pheidoleicomes Bosselaers, 2009 (type) — Greece, Turkey

=== Argistes ===
Argistes Simon, 1897

- A. seriatus (Karsch, 1892) — Sri Lanka
- A. velox Simon, 1897 (type) — Sri Lanka

== C ==
=== Coryssiphus ===
Coryssiphus Simon, 1903

- C. cinerascens Simon, 1903 — South Africa
- C. praeustus Simon, 1903 (type) — South Africa
- C. unicolor Simon, 1903 — South Africa

=== Cteniogaster ===
Cteniogaster Bosselaers & Jocqué, 2013

- C. conviva Bosselaers & Jocqué, 2013 — Tanzania
- C. hexomma Bosselaers & Jocqué, 2013 — Kenya
- C. lampropus Bosselaers & Jocqué, 2013 — Tanzania
- C. nana Bosselaers & Jocqué, 2013 — Tanzania
- C. sangarawe Bosselaers & Jocqué, 2013 — Tanzania
- C. taxorchis Bosselaers & Jocqué, 2013 — Tanzania
- C. toxarchus Bosselaers & Jocqué, 2013 (type) — Tanzania

=== Cybaeodes ===
Cybaeodes Simon, 1878

- C. alicatai Platnick & Di Franco, 1992 — Tunisia
- C. avolensis Platnick & Di Franco, 1992 — Italy (Sicily)
- C. carusoi Platnick & Di Franco, 1992 — Algeria
- C. dosaguas Ribera & De Mas, 2015 — Spain
- C. indalo Ribera & De Mas, 2015 — Spain
- C. liocraninus (Simon, 1913) — Algeria
- C. madidus Simon, 1914 — France
- C. magnus Ribera & De Mas, 2015 — Spain
- C. mallorcensis Wunderlich, 2008 — Spain (Majorca)
- C. marinae Di Franco, 1989 — Italy
- C. molara (Roewer, 1960) — Italy (Sicily)
- C. sardus Platnick & Di Franco, 1992 — Italy (Sardinia)
- C. testaceus Simon, 1878 (type) — France, Corsica

== D ==
=== Donuea ===
Donuea Strand, 1932

- D. collustrata Bosselaers & Dierick, 2010 — Madagascar
- D. decorsei (Simon, 1903) (type) — Madagascar

=== Drapeta ===
Drapeta Menge, 1875

- Drapeta caucasicus Seropian, Bulbulashvili & Krammer, 2024 – Caucasus (Russia, Georgia)
- Drapeta concolor (Simon, 1878) – France (Corsica)
- Drapeta rutilans (Thorell, 1875) (type) — Europe

== H ==
=== Hesperocranum ===
Hesperocranum Ubick & Platnick, 1991

- H. rothi Ubick & Platnick, 1991 (type) — USA

== J ==
=== Jacaena ===
Jacaena Thorell, 1897

- J. angoonae Dankittipakul, Tavano & Singtripop, 2013 — Thailand
- J. aspera Mu & Zhang, 2020 — China
- J. bannaensis Mu & Zhang, 2020 — China (incl. Hainan)
- J. distincta Thorell, 1897 (type) — Myanmar
- J. erawan (Deeleman-Reinhold, 2001) — Thailand
- J. jinxini Liu & Xu, 2020 — China
- J. lunulata Dankittipakul, Tavano & Singtripop, 2013 — Thailand
- J. luteola Mu & Zhang, 2020 — China
- J. menglaensis Mu & Zhang, 2020 — China
- J. mihun Deeleman-Reinhold, 2001 — Thailand
- J. peculiaris Dankittipakul, Tavano & Singtripop, 2013 — Thailand
- J. punctata Dankittipakul, Tavano & Singtripop, 2013 — Thailand
- J. schwendingeri (Deeleman-Reinhold, 2001) — Thailand
- J. tengchongensis Zhao & Peng, 2013 — China
- J. thakek (Jäger, 2007) — Laos
- J. zhui (Zhang & Fu, 2011) — China, Thailand

== K ==
=== Koppe ===
Koppe Deeleman-Reinhold, 2001

- K. armata (Simon, 1896) — Sri Lanka
- K. baerti Deeleman-Reinhold, 2001 — Indonesia (Sulawesi)
- K. calciphila Deeleman-Reinhold, 2001 — Indonesia (Sulawesi)
- K. doleschalli Deeleman-Reinhold, 2001 — Indonesia (Moluccas)
- K. kinabalensis Deeleman-Reinhold, 2001 — Borneo
- K. kuntneri Deeleman-Reinhold, 2001 — Indonesia (Moluccas)
- K. minuta Deeleman-Reinhold, 2001 — Indonesia (Java, Sumatra)
- K. montana Deeleman-Reinhold, 2001 (type) — Indonesia (Java)
- K. no Deeleman-Reinhold, 2001 — Indonesia (Sulawesi)
- K. princeps Deeleman-Reinhold, 2001 — Indonesia (Sulawesi)
- K. radiata (Thorell, 1881) — New Guinea
- K. sumba Deeleman-Reinhold, 2001 — Indonesia (Lesser Sunda Is.)
- K. tinikitkita (Barrion & Litsinger, 1995) — Philippines

== L ==
=== Laudetia ===
Laudetia Gertsch, 1941

- L. dominicana Gertsch, 1941 (type) — Dominica
- L. insularis (Petrunkevitch, 1930) — Puerto Rico
- L. portoricensis (Petrunkevitch, 1930) — Puerto Rico

=== Liocranoeca ===
Liocranoeca Wunderlich, 1999

- L. emertoni (Kaston, 1938) — USA
- L. spasskyi Ponomarev, 2007 — Ukraine, Russia (Europe)
- L. striata (Kulczyński, 1882) (type) — Europe, Russia (Europe to South Siberia)
- L. vjosensis Komnenov, 2018 — Albania

=== Liocranum ===
Liocranum

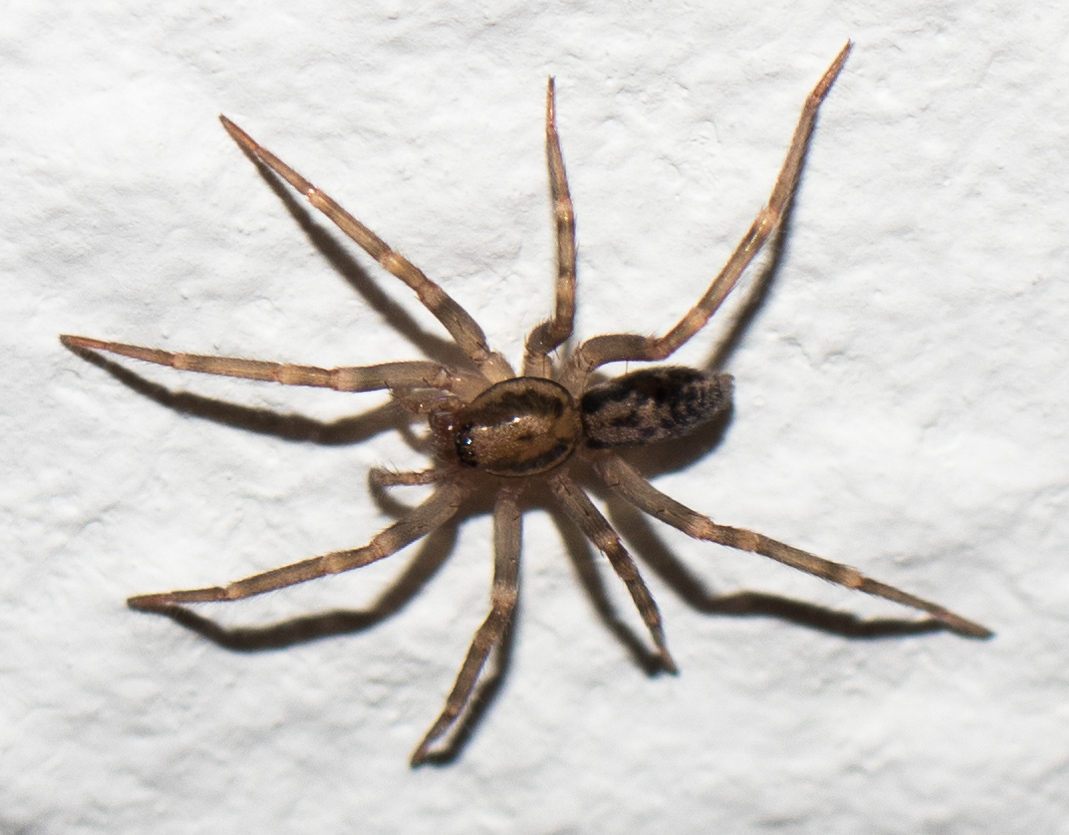
Liocranum rupicola, male

Liocranum L. Koch, 1866

- L. apertum Denis, 1960 — Spain, France
- L. concolor Simon, 1878 — France (Corsica)
- L. erythrinum (Pavesi, 1883) — Ethiopia
- L. freibergi Charitonov, 1946 — Uzbekistan
- L. giersbergi Kraus, 1955 — Italy (Sardinia)
- L. inornatum (L. Koch, 1882) — Spain (Majorca)
- L. kochi Herman, 1879 — Slovakia
- L. majus Simon, 1878 — Spain
- L. nigritarse L. Koch, 1875 — Ethiopia
- L. perarmatum Kulczyński, 1897 — Slovenia, Croatia
- L. pulchrum Thorell, 1881 — New Guinea
- L. remotum Bryant, 1940 — Cuba
- L. rupicola (Walckenaer, 1830) (type) — Europe, Turkey, Armenia, Russia (Europe to West Siberia)
- L. segmentatum Simon, 1878 — France

=== Liparochrysis ===
Liparochrysis Simon, 1909

- L. resplendens Simon, 1909 (type) — Australia (Western Australia)

== M ==
=== Mesiotelus ===
Mesiotelus Simon, 1897

- M. annulipes (Kulczyński, 1897) — Slovakia, Hungary, Croatia, Serbia, Bulgaria, Turkey, Ukraine
- M. cyprius Kulczyński, 1908 — Cyprus
- M. deltshevi Naumova, 2020 — Albania
- M. grancanariensis Wunderlich, 1992 — Portugal, Canary Is., Madeira
- M. kulczynskii Charitonov, 1946 — Central Asia
- M. libanicus (Simon, 1878) — Lebanon
- M. lubricus (Simon, 1880) — China
- M. maderianus Kulczyński, 1899 — Madeira
- M. mauritanicus Simon, 1909 — Mediterranean
- M. pococki Caporiacco, 1949 — Kenya
- M. scopensis Drensky, 1935 — North Macedonia, Bulgaria, Greece, Turkey, Iran
- M. tenellus (Thorell, 1875) — Italy
- M. tenuissimus (L. Koch, 1866) (type) — Europe, North Africa, Turkmenistan
- M. viridis (L. Koch, 1867) — Greece (incl. Crete)
- M. zonsteini Mikhailov, 1986 — Central Asia

=== Mesobria ===
Mesobria Simon, 1898

- M. guttata Simon, 1898 (type) — St. Vincent

== N ==
=== Neoanagraphis ===
Neoanagraphis Gertsch & Mulaik, 1936

- N. chamberlini Gertsch & Mulaik, 1936 (type) — USA, Mexico
- N. pearcei Gertsch, 1941 — USA

== O ==
=== Oedignatha ===
Oedignatha Thorell, 1881

- O. adhartali (Gajbe, 2003) — India
- O. affinis Simon, 1897 — Sri Lanka
- O. albofasciata Strand, 1907 — India
- O. aleipata (Marples, 1955) — Samoa
- O. andamanensis (Tikader, 1977) — India (Andaman Is.)
- O. barbata Deeleman-Reinhold, 2001 — Thailand
- O. bicolor Simon, 1896 — Sri Lanka
- O. binoyii Reddy & Patel, 1993 — India
- O. bucculenta Thorell, 1897 — Myanmar
- O. canaca Berland, 1938 — Vanuatu
- O. carli Reimoser, 1934 — India
- O. coriacea Simon, 1897 — Sri Lanka
- O. dentifera Reimoser, 1934 — India
- O. escheri Reimoser, 1934 — India
- O. ferox (Thorell, 1897) — Myanmar
- O. flavipes Simon, 1897 — Sri Lanka
- O. gulosa Simon, 1897 — Sri Lanka
- O. indica (Tikader, 1981) — India
- O. indica Reddy & Patel, 1993 — India
- O. jocquei Deeleman-Reinhold, 2001 — Thailand
- O. lesserti Reimoser, 1934 — India
- O. major Simon, 1896 — Sri Lanka
- O. microscutata Reimoser, 1934 — India
- O. mogamoga Marples, 1955 — Malaysia, Indonesia (Borneo). Introduced to Seychelles, Samoa
- O. montigena Simon, 1897 — Sri Lanka
- O. platnicki Song & Zhu, 1998 — China (Hong Kong), Taiwan
- O. poonaensis Majumder & Tikader, 1991 — India
- O. proboscidea (Strand, 1913) — Sri Lanka
- O. procerula Simon, 1897 — India
- O. raigadensis Bastawade, 2006 — India
- O. retusa Simon, 1897 — Sri Lanka
- O. rugulosa Thorell, 1897 — Myanmar
- O. scrobiculata Thorell, 1881 (type) — India, Thailand, Malaysia, Philippines, Indonesia, Taiwan. Introduced to Madagascar, Seychelles, Reunion, Germany
- O. shillongensis Biswas & Majumder, 1995 — India
- O. sima Simon, 1886 — Thailand
- O. spadix Deeleman-Reinhold, 2001 — Indonesia (Sulawesi, Lesser Sunda Is.)
- O. striata Simon, 1897 — Sri Lanka
- O. tricuspidata Reimoser, 1934 — India
- O. uncata Reimoser, 1934 — India

== P ==
=== † Palaeospinisoma ===
† Palaeospinisoma Wunderlich, 2004

- † P. femoralis Wunderlich, 2004

=== Paratus ===
Paratus Simon, 1898

- P. halabala Zapata & Ramírez, 2010 — Thailand
- P. hamatus Mu & Zhang, 2018 — China
- P. indicus Marusik, Zheng & Li, 2008 — India
- P. kentingensis Mu & Zhang, 2018 — Taiwan
- P. longlingensis Zhao & Peng, 2013 — China
- P. perus Sankaran, Malamel, Joseph & Sebastian, 2017 — India
- P. reticulatus Simon, 1898 (type) — Sri Lanka
- P. sinensis Marusik, Zheng & Li, 2008 — China

=== Platnick ===
Platnick Marusik & Fomichev, 2020

- P. astana Marusik & Fomichev, 2020 — Tajikistan
- P. sanglok Marusik & Fomichev, 2020 — Tajikistan
- P. shablyai Marusik & Fomichev, 2020 (type) — Tajikistan

== R ==
=== Rhaeboctesis ===
Rhaeboctesis Simon, 1897

- Rhaeboctesis denotata Lawrence, 1928 - Angola, Namibia
- Rhaeboctesis equestris Simon, 1897 - South Africa
- Rhaeboctesis exilis Tucker, 1920 - South Africa
- Rhaeboctesis matroosbergensis Tucker, 1920 - South Africa
- Rhaeboctesis secunda Tucker, 1920 - South Africa
- Rhaeboctesis transvaalensis Tucker, 1920 - South Africa
- Rhaeboctesis trinotata Tucker, 1920 - South Africa
- Rhaeboctesis xizangensis Hu, 2001 - China

== S ==
=== Scotina ===
Scotina Menge, 1873

- S. celans (Blackwall, 1841) — Europe, Algeria
- S. gracilipes (Blackwall, 1859) (type) — Europe
- S. occulta Kritscher, 1996 — Malta
- S. palliardii (L. Koch, 1881) — Europe, Turkey, Korea

=== Sesieutes ===
Sesieutes Simon, 1897

- S. aberrans Dankittipakul & Deeleman-Reinhold, 2013 — Thailand
- S. abruptus Dankittipakul & Deeleman-Reinhold, 2013 — Malaysia
- S. apiculatus Dankittipakul & Deeleman-Reinhold, 2013 — Indonesia
- S. bifidus Dankittipakul & Deeleman-Reinhold, 2013 — Malaysia
- S. borneensis Deeleman-Reinhold, 2001 — Borneo, Sulawesi, Philippines
- S. bulbosus Deeleman-Reinhold, 2001 — Borneo
- S. emancipatus Deeleman-Reinhold, 2001 — Malaysia
- S. longyangensis Zhao & Peng, 2013 — China
- S. lucens Simon, 1897 (type) — Malaysia, Singapore
- S. minor Deeleman-Reinhold, 2001 — Borneo
- S. minuatus Dankittipakul & Deeleman-Reinhold, 2013 — Thailand
- S. nitens Deeleman-Reinhold, 2001 — Indonesia (Java, Sumatra)
- S. scrobiculatus Deeleman-Reinhold, 2001 — Indonesia (Sumatra)

=== Sphingius ===
Sphingius Thorell, 1890

- S. barkudensis Gravely, 1931 — India, Bangladesh
- S. bifurcatus Dankittipakul, Tavano & Singtripop, 2011 — Thailand, Malaysia
- S. bilineatus Simon, 1906 — India
- S. caniceps Simon, 1906 — India
- S. deelemanae Zhang & Fu, 2010 — China
- S. elongatus Dankittipakul, Tavano & Singtripop, 2011 — Thailand
- S. gothicus Deeleman-Reinhold, 2001 — Thailand
- S. gracilis (Thorell, 1895) — China, Myanmar
- S. hainan Zhang, Fu & Zhu, 2009 — China
- S. nilgiriensis Gravely, 1931 — India
- S. octomaculatus Deeleman-Reinhold, 2001 — Thailand
- S. paltaensis Biswas & Biswas, 1992 — India
- S. penicillus Deeleman-Reinhold, 2001 — Thailand
- S. prolixus Dankittipakul, Tavano & Singtripop, 2011 — Thailand
- S. punctatus Deeleman-Reinhold, 2001 — Thailand to Indonesia (Lesser Sunda Is.)
- S. rama Dankittipakul, Tavano & Singtripop, 2011 — Thailand
- S. scrobiculatus Thorell, 1897 — China, Taiwan, Myanmar, Thailand
- S. scutatus Simon, 1897 — Sri Lanka
- S. songi Deeleman-Reinhold, 2001 — Thailand
- S. spinosus Dankittipakul, Tavano & Singtripop, 2011 — Thailand, Malaysia, Indonesia (Sumatra)
- S. superbus Dankittipakul, Tavano & Singtripop, 2011 — Thailand, Malaysia
- S. thecatus Thorell, 1890 (type) — Malaysia
- S. tristiculus Simon, 1903 — Vietnam
- S. vivax (Thorell, 1897) — Myanmar, Thailand, Vietnam, Malaysia, Philippines
- S. zhangi Zhang, Fu & Zhu, 2009 — China

=== Sudharmia ===
Sudharmia Deeleman-Reinhold, 2001

- S. beroni Deeleman-Reinhold, 2001 — Indonesia (Sumatra)
- S. pongorum Deeleman-Reinhold, 2001 (type) — Indonesia (Sumatra)
- S. tridenticula Dankittipakul & Deeleman-Reinhold, 2012 — Indonesia (Sumatra)

== T ==
=== Teutamus ===
Teutamus Thorell, 1890

- T. andrewdavisi Deeleman-Reinhold, 2001 — Borneo
- T. apiculatus Dankittipakul, Tavano & Singtripop, 2012 — Malaysia
- T. brachiatus Dankittipakul, Tavano & Singtripop, 2012 — Thailand, Malaysia
- T. calceolatus Dankittipakul, Tavano & Singtripop, 2012 — Malaysia
- T. christae Ono, 2009 — Vietnam
- T. deelemanae Dankittipakul, Tavano & Singtripop, 2012 — Malaysia
- T. fertilis Deeleman-Reinhold, 2001 — Indonesia (Sumatra)
- T. globularis Dankittipakul, Tavano & Singtripop, 2012 — Malaysia
- T. hirtellus Dankittipakul, Tavano & Singtripop, 2012 — Philippines
- T. jambiensis Deeleman-Reinhold, 2001 — Indonesia (Sumatra)
- T. leptothecus Dankittipakul, Tavano & Singtripop, 2012 — Malaysia
- T. lioneli Dankittipakul, Tavano & Singtripop, 2012 — Malaysia
- T. orthogonus Dankittipakul, Tavano & Singtripop, 2012 — Indonesia (Sumatra)
- T. poggii Dankittipakul, Tavano & Singtripop, 2012 — Indonesia (Sumatra)
- T. politus Thorell, 1890 (type) — Thailand, Malaysia
- T. rama Dankittipakul, Tavano & Singtripop, 2012 — Thailand, Malaysia
- T. rhino Deeleman-Reinhold, 2001 — Indonesia (Java)
- T. rollardae Dankittipakul, Tavano & Singtripop, 2012 — Indonesia (Sumatra)
- T. rothorum Deeleman-Reinhold, 2001 — Indonesia (Java)
- T. seculatus Dankittipakul, Tavano & Singtripop, 2012 — Malaysia, Indonesia
- T. serrulatus Dankittipakul, Tavano & Singtripop, 2012 — Malaysia
- T. spiralis Dankittipakul, Tavano & Singtripop, 2012 — Borneo
- T. sumatranus Dankittipakul, Tavano & Singtripop, 2012 — Indonesia (Sumatra)
- T. tortuosus Dankittipakul, Tavano & Singtripop, 2012 — Indonesia (Sumatra)
- T. vittatus Deeleman-Reinhold, 2001 — Borneo

=== Toxoniella ===
Toxoniella Warui & Jocqué, 2002

- T. nyeri Oketch & Li, 2021 — Kenya
- T. rogoae Warui & Jocqué, 2002 — Kenya
- T. taitensis Warui & Jocqué, 2002 (type) — Kenya
- T. tharaka Oketch & Li, 2021 — Kenya
- T. waruii Oketch & Li, 2021 — Kenya

== V ==
=== Vankeeria ===
Vankeeria Bosselaers, 2012

- V. catoptronifera Bosselaers, 2012 (type) — Greece

== X ==
=== Xenoplectus ===
Xenoplectus Schiapelli & Gerschman, 1958

- X. armatus Schiapelli & Gerschman, 1958 (type) — Argentina
