= Turkocranum =

Scientific classification
- Kingdom: Animalia
- Phylum: Arthropoda
- Subphylum: Chelicerata
- Class: Arachnida
- Order: Araneae
- Infraorder: Araneomorphae
- Family: Liocranidae
- Genus: Turkocranum; Danışman & Coşar, 2022
- Species: T. bosselaersi

Binomial name
- Turkocranum bosselaersi Danışman & Coşar, 2022

Species of spider

Turkocranum is a monotypic genus of spiders in the family Liocranidae containing the single species, Turkocranum bosselaersi.

== Distribution ==
Turkocranum bosselaersi has only been recorded from Turkey.

== Description ==
This species resembles resembles Liocranum L. Koch, 1866 and Mesiotelus Simon, 1897. Body length is about 4 mm. The carapace is yellowish brown.

== Etymology ==
The genus name is a combination of "Turkey" and genus Liocranum. The species is named in honor of Belgian arachnologist Jan Bosselaers.
