= Sestakovaia =

Scientific classification
- Kingdom: Animalia
- Phylum: Arthropoda
- Subphylum: Chelicerata
- Class: Arachnida
- Order: Araneae
- Infraorder: Araneomorphae
- Family: Liocranidae
- Genus: Sestakovaia; Zamani & Marusik, 2021

Type species
- S. hyrcania Zamani & Marusik, 2021

Species
- Sestakovaia annulipes (Kulczyński, 1897); Sestakovaia hyrcania Zamani & Marusik, 2021

Genus of spiders

Sestakovaia is a small genus of liocranid sac spiders first described by Alireza Zamani and Yuri M. Marusik in 2021. As of December 2021 it contains only two species: S. annulipes and S. hyrcania. This genus is named after the Slovakian arachnologist Anna Šestáková.

== See also ==
- Mesiotelus
- Liocranum
