= Drapeta rutilans =

Scientific classification
- Kingdom: Animalia
- Phylum: Arthropoda
- Subphylum: Chelicerata
- Class: Arachnida
- Order: Araneae
- Infraorder: Araneomorphae
- Family: Liocranidae
- Genus: Drapeta
- Species: D. rutilans

Binomial name
- Drapeta rutilans (Thorell, 1875)

Synonyms
- Drapeta aeneus Menge, 1875; Liocranum metallicum L. Koch, 1877; Liocranum rutilans (Thorell, 1875); Liocranum squamosum L. Koch, 1876; Sagana rutilans Thorell, 1875

Species of spider

Drapeta rutilans, synonym Liocranum rutilans, is a species of spider in the family Liocranidae. It was for a long time known incorrectly as Sagana rutilans; the genus name Sagana Thorell, 1875 is a junior homonym of the moth genus Sagana Walker, 1855 (now treated as a synonym of Copaxa), so the combination Sagana rutilans is unavailable.

== Distribution ==
Drapeta rutilans is native to Europe. It has been recorded from Georgia, but in 2024 Seropian et al. considered that such records probably referred to their newly described species D. caucasica.
