= Sinocranum =

Scientific classification
- Kingdom: Animalia
- Phylum: Arthropoda
- Subphylum: Chelicerata
- Class: Arachnida
- Order: Araneae
- Infraorder: Araneomorphae
- Family: Liocranidae
- Genus: Sinocranum; Chu & Li, 2023
- Species: S. menghai

Binomial name
- Sinocranum menghai Chu & Li, 2023

Species of spider

Sinocranum is a monotypic genus of spiders in the family Liocranidae containing the single species, Sinocranum menghai.

== Distribution ==
Sinocranum menghai has been recorded from Menghai County, Xishuangbanna, Yunnan, China, where one male and two females were caught in leaf litter by hand.

== Description ==
Body length is between 8-11 mm. The eight eyes are in two rows. The species resembles the genus Agroeca.

== Etymology ==
The genus name is a combination of "sino" ("China") and related genus Liocranum. The species is named after the type locality.
