= Platnick (spider) =

Scientific classification
- Kingdom: Animalia
- Phylum: Arthropoda
- Subphylum: Chelicerata
- Class: Arachnida
- Order: Araneae
- Infraorder: Araneomorphae
- Family: Liocranidae
- Genus: Platnick; Marusik & Fomichev, 2020

Type species
- P. shablyai Marusik & Fomichev, 2020

Species
- Platnick astana Marusik & Fomichev, 2020; Platnick sanglok Marusik & Fomichev, 2020; Platnick shablyai Marusik & Fomichev, 2020

Genus of spiders

Platnick is a genus of central Asian liocranid sac spiders. It was first described by Yuri M. Marusik and A. A. Fomichev in 2020, and it has only been found in Tajikistan. As of December 2021 it contains only three species: P. astana, P. sanglok, and P. shablyai.
