= Koppe armata =

Scientific classification
- Kingdom: Animalia
- Phylum: Arthropoda
- Subphylum: Chelicerata
- Class: Arachnida
- Order: Araneae
- Infraorder: Araneomorphae
- Family: Liocranidae
- Genus: Koppe
- Species: K. armata

Binomial name
- Koppe armata (Simon, 1896)

Species of spider

Koppe armata is a species of spider of the genus Koppe. It is endemic to Sri Lanka.
