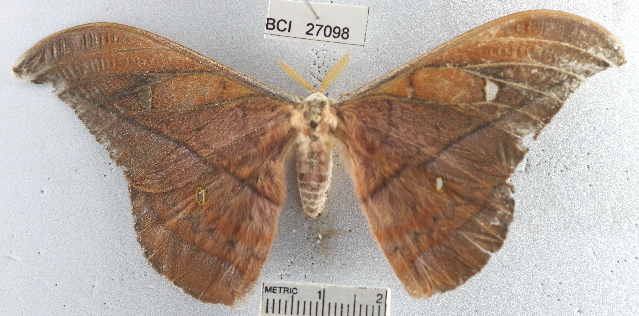

Scientific classification
- Kingdom: Animalia
- Phylum: Arthropoda
- Class: Insecta
- Order: Lepidoptera
- Family: Saturniidae
- Genus: Copaxa
- Species: C. decrescens

Binomial name
- Copaxa decrescens Walker, 1855

= Copaxa decrescens =

Species of moth

Copaxa decrescens is a species of moth in the family Saturniidae first described by Francis Walker in 1855. It is widespread in Central and South America at low to medium altitudes.

The wingspan is 90–120 mm for males and 105–125 mm for females.

The larvae feed on Persea, Salix and Quercus species, including Quercus ilex.
