= Paratus reticulatus =

Scientific classification
- Kingdom: Animalia
- Phylum: Arthropoda
- Subphylum: Chelicerata
- Class: Arachnida
- Order: Araneae
- Infraorder: Araneomorphae
- Family: Liocranidae
- Genus: Paratus
- Species: P. reticulatus

Binomial name
- Paratus reticulatus Simon, 1898

Species of spider

Paratus reticulatus, is a species of spider of the genus Paratus. It is endemic to Sri Lanka.
