= Coryssiphus =

Scientific classification
- Kingdom: Animalia
- Phylum: Arthropoda
- Subphylum: Chelicerata
- Class: Arachnida
- Order: Araneae
- Infraorder: Araneomorphae
- Family: Miturgidae
- Genus: Coryssiphus; Simon

Species
- 2, see text

Genus of spiders

Coryssiphus is a genus of spiders in the family Miturgidae (Liocranidae before 2024), with two recognized species. It was first described in 1903 by Simon. Both species are endemic to South Africa.

== Species ==
As of October 2025, this genus includes two species:

- Coryssiphus cinerascens Simon, 1903 – South Africa
- Coryssiphus praeustus Simon, 1903 – South Africa (type species)
