= Argistes seriatus =

Scientific classification
- Kingdom: Animalia
- Phylum: Arthropoda
- Subphylum: Chelicerata
- Class: Arachnida
- Order: Araneae
- Infraorder: Araneomorphae
- Family: Liocranidae
- Genus: Argistes
- Species: A. seriatus

Binomial name
- Argistes seriatus (Karsch, 1892)

Species of spider

Argistes seriatus, is a species of spider of the genus Argistes. It is endemic to Sri Lanka.
