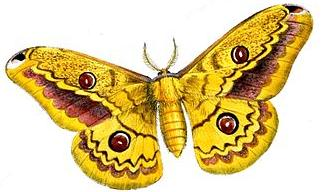

Scientific classification
- Kingdom: Animalia
- Phylum: Arthropoda
- Clade: Pancrustacea
- Class: Insecta
- Order: Lepidoptera
- Family: Saturniidae
- Genus: Copaxa
- Species: C. lavendera

Binomial name
- Copaxa lavendera (Westwood, 1853)

Synonyms
- Saturnia lavendera Westwood, 1853; Copaxa plenkeri C. & R. Felder, 1860

= Copaxa lavendera =

Species of moth

Copaxa lavendera is a species of moth in the family Saturniidae. It was first described by John O. Westwood in 1854. It is found in central-western Mexico south to Guatemala, possibly to Honduras. It has been spotted in the Netherlands on multiple occasions, probably imported on plants.

== Description ==
The forewing length is about 60 mm (2.4 in) in males. Females are slightly larger. Wings are yellow in females but brownish in males.

== Ecology ==
Copaxa lavendera is associated with highland habitats, both semiarid and humids ones. In Mexico, it occurs at elevations of 1,500–2,350 m (4,920–7,710 ft). Adalts are most active during the rainy season.
