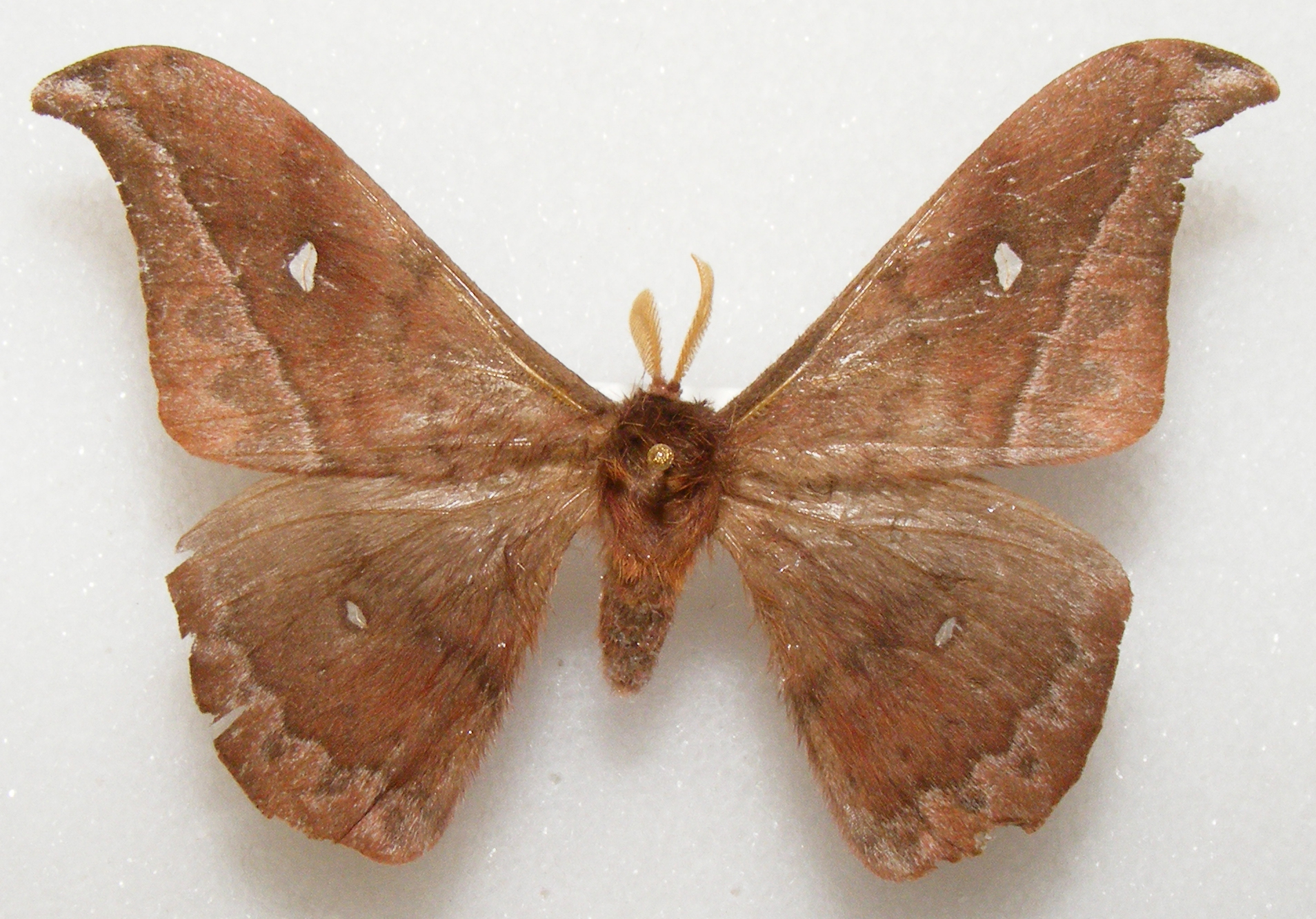

Scientific classification
- Domain: Eukaryota
- Kingdom: Animalia
- Phylum: Arthropoda
- Class: Insecta
- Order: Lepidoptera
- Family: Saturniidae
- Genus: Copaxa
- Species: C. cydippe

Binomial name
- Copaxa cydippe (H. Druce, 1894)

Synonyms
- Attacus cydippe H. Druce, 1894

= Copaxa cydippe =

Species of moth

Copaxa cydippe is a species of moth in the family Saturniidae first described by Herbert Druce in 1894. It is found in Central America, including Mexico and Guatemala.

The larvae feed on Pinus species.
