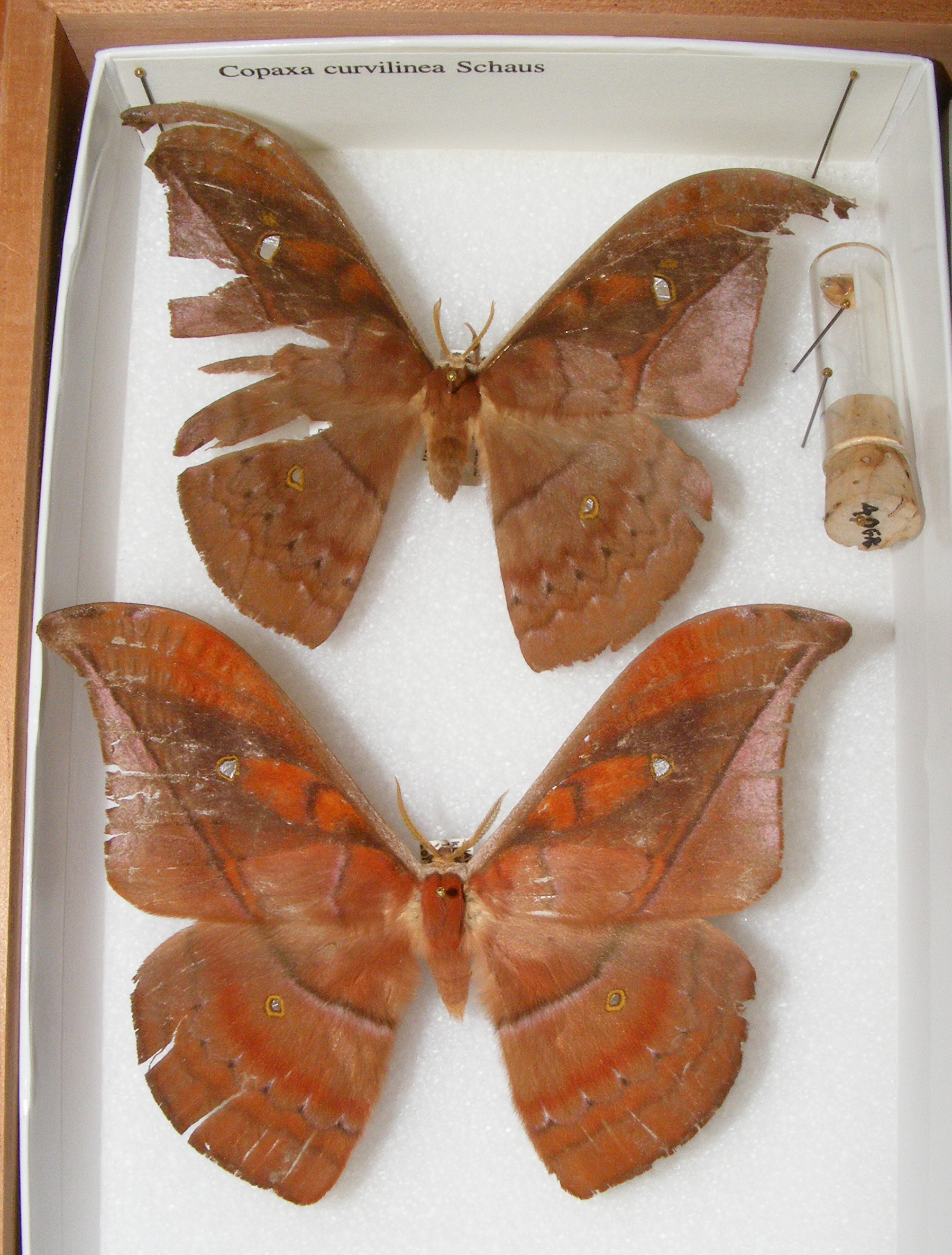

Scientific classification
- Domain: Eukaryota
- Kingdom: Animalia
- Phylum: Arthropoda
- Class: Insecta
- Order: Lepidoptera
- Family: Saturniidae
- Genus: Copaxa
- Species: C. curvilinea

Binomial name
- Copaxa curvilinea Schaus, 1912

= Copaxa curvilinea =

Species of moth

Copaxa curvilinea is a species of moth in the family Saturniidae first described by William Schaus in 1912. It is found in Central America, including Nicaragua and Costa Rica.

The larvae feed on Nectandra membranacea.
