= Sphingius scutatus =

Scientific classification
- Kingdom: Animalia
- Phylum: Arthropoda
- Subphylum: Chelicerata
- Class: Arachnida
- Order: Araneae
- Infraorder: Araneomorphae
- Family: Liocranidae
- Genus: Sphingius
- Species: S. scutatus

Binomial name
- Sphingius scutatus Simon, 1897

Species of spider

Sphingius scutatus, is a species of spiders of the genus Sphingius. It is endemic to Sri Lanka.
