= Platnick =

Platnick is a surname. Notable people with the surname include:

- Brian Platnick, American bridge player
- Norman I. Platnick (1951–2020), American biological systematist and arachnologist
- Ray Platnick (1917–1986), American photojournalist and newspaper photographer

== See also ==
- Platnick (spider)
- Plotnick
