= Argistes velox =

Scientific classification
- Kingdom: Animalia
- Phylum: Arthropoda
- Subphylum: Chelicerata
- Class: Arachnida
- Order: Araneae
- Infraorder: Araneomorphae
- Family: Liocranidae
- Genus: Argistes
- Species: A. velox

Binomial name
- Argistes velox Simon, 1897

Species of spider

Argistes velox, is a species of spider of the genus Argistes. It is endemic to Sri Lanka.
