= Andromma raffrayi =

Scientific classification
- Kingdom: Animalia
- Phylum: Arthropoda
- Subphylum: Chelicerata
- Class: Arachnida
- Order: Araneae
- Infraorder: Araneomorphae
- Family: Liocranidae
- Genus: Andromma
- Species: A. raffrayi

Binomial name
- Andromma raffrayi Simon, 1899

Synonyms
- Andromma raffrayi inhacorense Lessert, 1936

Species of spider

Andromma raffrayi is a species of spider in the family Liocranidae. It is endemic to South Africa.

== Distribution ==
Andromma raffrayi is found in South Africa, with records from the Eastern Cape and Western Cape provinces. Notable locations include Cape Town, the slopes of Devil's Peak in Table Mountain National Park, Stellenbosch, and Willowmore.

== Habitat and ecology ==
The species inhabits Fynbos and Thicket biomes at altitudes ranging from 5 to 861 m above sea level. These free-living ground-dwelling spiders have been found in association with ant colonies, with Tucker (1923) collecting males and females from nests of Plagiolepis custodiens ants in the Western Cape Province.

== Description ==
Andromma raffrayi is known from both sexes.

== Conservation ==
Andromma raffrayi is listed as Data Deficient due to limited knowledge of its distribution range. The species has been recorded from only a few specimens across two provinces, and more sampling is needed to determine its true range and conservation status. It is currently protected within Table Mountain National Park.

== Taxonomy ==
The species was originally described by Eugène Simon in 1899, with the type locality given only as "Bonae Spei" (Cape of Good Hope) without exact coordinates. The subspecies Andromma raffrayi inhacorense was described by Lessert in 1936 from Inhacoro, Mozambique, but was later synonymized with the nominate form by Bosselaers & Jocqué in 2022.
