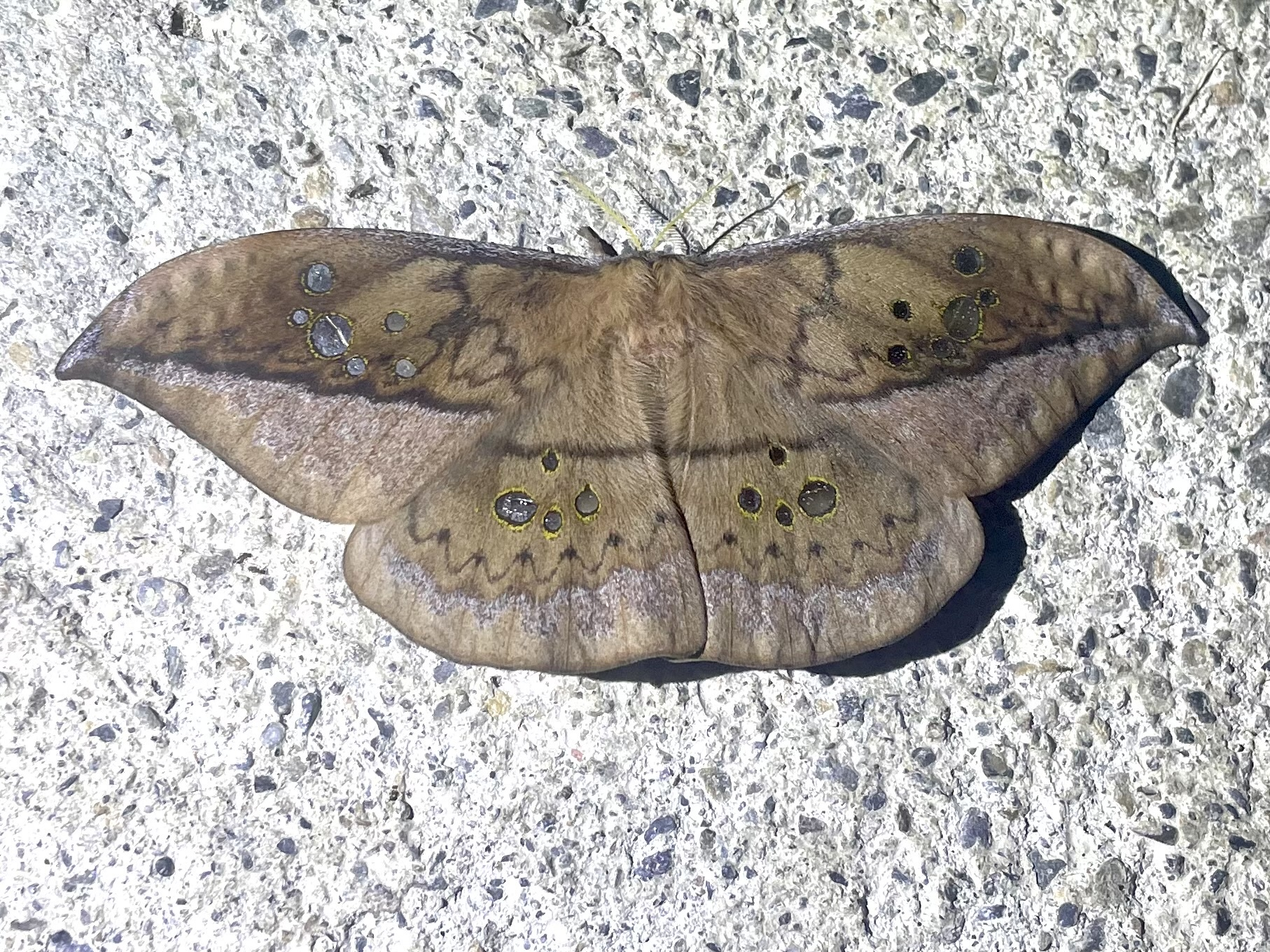

Scientific classification
- Domain: Eukaryota
- Kingdom: Animalia
- Phylum: Arthropoda
- Class: Insecta
- Order: Lepidoptera
- Family: Saturniidae
- Genus: Copaxa
- Species: C. denhezi

Binomial name
- Copaxa denhezi Lemaire, 1971

= Copaxa denhezi =

Species of moths

Copaxa denhezi is a species of moth in the Saturniidae family. It was first described in 1971 by Claude Lemaire and is found in Colombia.
