= Teutamus (spider) =

Scientific classification
- Domain: Eukaryota
- Kingdom: Animalia
- Phylum: Arthropoda
- Subphylum: Chelicerata
- Class: Arachnida
- Order: Araneae
- Infraorder: Araneomorphae
- Family: Liocranidae
- Genus: Teutamus; Thorell, 1890

Type species
- T. politus Thorell, 1890

Species
- 25, see text

Genus of spiders

Teutamus is a genus of Southeast Asian liocranid sac spiders first described by Tamerlan Thorell in 1890.

== Species ==
As of April 2019 it contains twenty-five species:

- Teutamus andrewdavisi Deeleman-Reinhold, 2001 – Borneo
- Teutamus apiculatus Dankittipakul, Tavano & Singtripop, 2012 – Malaysia
- Teutamus brachiatus Dankittipakul, Tavano & Singtripop, 2012 – Thailand, Malaysia
- Teutamus calceolatus Dankittipakul, Tavano & Singtripop, 2012 – Malaysia
- Teutamus christae Ono, 2009 – Vietnam
- Teutamus deelemanae Dankittipakul, Tavano & Singtripop, 2012 – Malaysia
- Teutamus fertilis Deeleman-Reinhold, 2001 – Indonesia (Sumatra)
- Teutamus globularis Dankittipakul, Tavano & Singtripop, 2012 – Malaysia
- Teutamus hirtellus Dankittipakul, Tavano & Singtripop, 2012 – Philippines
- Teutamus jambiensis Deeleman-Reinhold, 2001 – Indonesia (Sumatra)
- Teutamus leptothecus Dankittipakul, Tavano & Singtripop, 2012 – Malaysia
- Teutamus lioneli Dankittipakul, Tavano & Singtripop, 2012 – Malaysia
- Teutamus orthogonus Dankittipakul, Tavano & Singtripop, 2012 – Indonesia (Sumatra)
- Teutamus poggii Dankittipakul, Tavano & Singtripop, 2012 – Indonesia (Sumatra)
- Teutamus politus Thorell, 1890 (type) – Thailand, Malaysia
- Teutamus rama Dankittipakul, Tavano & Singtripop, 2012 – Thailand, Malaysia
- Teutamus rhino Deeleman-Reinhold, 2001 – Indonesia (Java)
- Teutamus rollardae Dankittipakul, Tavano & Singtripop, 2012 – Indonesia (Sumatra)
- Teutamus rothorum Deeleman-Reinhold, 2001 – Indonesia (Java)
- Teutamus seculatus Dankittipakul, Tavano & Singtripop, 2012 – Malaysia, Indonesia
- Teutamus serrulatus Dankittipakul, Tavano & Singtripop, 2012 – Malaysia
- Teutamus spiralis Dankittipakul, Tavano & Singtripop, 2012 – Borneo
- Teutamus sumatranus Dankittipakul, Tavano & Singtripop, 2012 – Indonesia (Sumatra)
- Teutamus tortuosus Dankittipakul, Tavano & Singtripop, 2012 – Indonesia (Sumatra)
- Teutamus vittatus Deeleman-Reinhold, 2001 – Borneo
