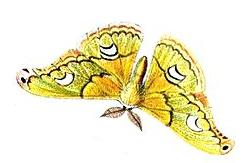

Scientific classification
- Kingdom: Animalia
- Phylum: Arthropoda
- Class: Insecta
- Order: Lepidoptera
- Family: Saturniidae
- Genus: Copaxa
- Species: C. sapatoza

Binomial name
- Copaxa sapatoza (Westwood, 1854)

Synonyms
- Saturnia sapatoza Westwood, 1854; Sagana sapatoza (Westwood, 1854)

= Copaxa sapatoza =

Species of moth

Copaxa sapatoza is a species of moth in the family Saturniidae first described by John O. Westwood in 1854 as Saturnia sapatoza. It is found in the north-east of the Andean Cordillera in Colombia at high elevations.

The larvae feed on Alnus rhombifolia and Persea americana.
