= Toxoniella =

Scientific classification
- Kingdom: Animalia
- Phylum: Arthropoda
- Subphylum: Chelicerata
- Class: Arachnida
- Order: Araneae
- Infraorder: Araneomorphae
- Family: Liocranidae
- Genus: Toxoniella; Jocqué

Species
- Toxoniella nyeri Oketch & Li, 2021; Toxoniella rogoae Warui & Jocqué, 2002; Toxoniella taitensis Warui & Jocqué, 2002; Toxoniella tharaka Oketch & Li, 2021; Toxoniella waruii Oketch & Li, 2021

Genus of spiders

Toxoniella is a genus of spiders in the family Liocranidae. It was first described in 2002 by Warui & Jocqué. As of 2021, it contains five species, all from Kenya.
