= Laudetia =

Scientific classification
- Domain: Eukaryota
- Kingdom: Animalia
- Phylum: Arthropoda
- Subphylum: Chelicerata
- Class: Arachnida
- Order: Araneae
- Infraorder: Araneomorphae
- Family: Liocranidae
- Genus: Laudetia; Gertsch

Species
- Laudetia dominicana Gertsch, 1941; Laudetia insularis (Petrunkevitch, 1930); Laudetia portoricensis (Petrunkevitch, 1930)

Genus of spiders

Laudetia is a genus of spiders in the family Liocranidae. It was first described in 1941 by Gertsch. As of 2016, it contains 3 species from the Caribbean.
