= Agraecina =

Scientific classification
- Kingdom: Animalia
- Phylum: Arthropoda
- Subphylum: Chelicerata
- Class: Arachnida
- Order: Araneae
- Infraorder: Araneomorphae
- Family: Liocranidae
- Genus: Agraecina; Simon, 1932

Type species
- A. lineata (Simon, 1878)

Species
- 6, see text

Synonyms
- Lascona Georgescu, 1989

Genus of spiders

Agraecina is a genus of liocranid sac spiders that was first described by Eugène Louis Simon in 1932. Most species in the genus have a restricted habitat and narrow distribution, with exception of type species Agraecina lineata, which is known from a wider range of habitats over a larger area.

== Species ==
As of November 2024, the World Spider Catalog recognizes eight species, found in Africa, Europe and Asia:

- Agraecina agadirensis Lecigne, Lips, Moutaouakil & Oger, 2020 - Morocco
- Agraecina canariensis Wunderlich, 1992 – Canary Is.
- Agraecina cristiani (Georgescu, 1989) – Romania, Slovakia
- Agraecina hodna Bosmans, 1999 – Algeria
- Agraecina lineata (Simon, 1878) (type) – Western Mediterranean to Kazakhstan
- Agraecina rutilia (Simon, 1897) – Sierra Leone
- Agraecina salsicola Bosmans & Boubakri, 2020 - Tunisia
- Agraecina scupiensis Deltshev, 2016 – North Macedonia, Greece

== Former species and subspecies ==
Per the World Spider Catalog:

- Agraecina albicans (Bösenberg, 1902) (synonym of Agraecina lineata (Simon, 1878))
- Agraecina striata (Kulczyński, 1882) (now Liocranoeca striata)
  - Agraecina striata gracilior (Kulczyński, 1898) (synonym of Liocranoeca striata)
