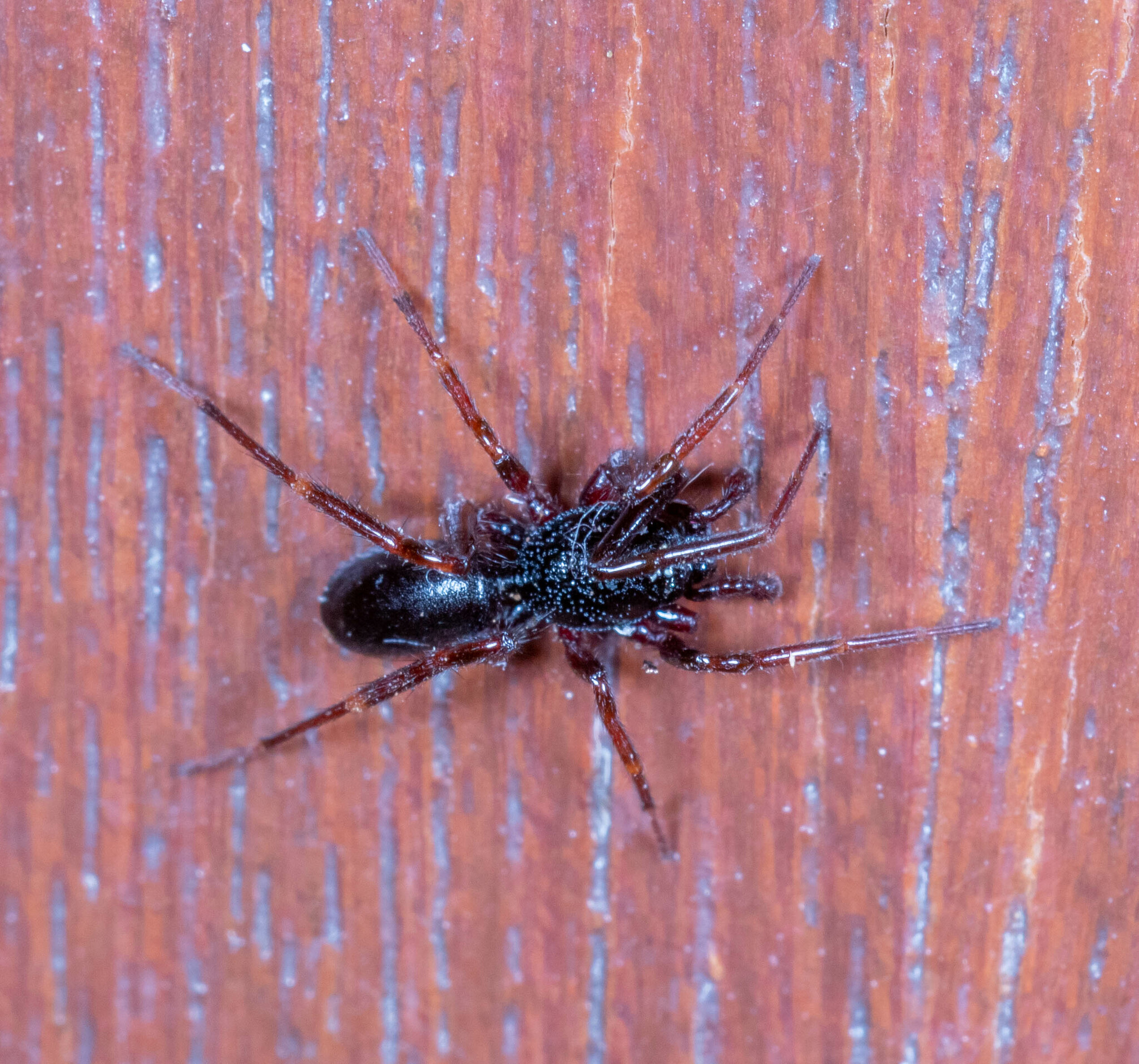
- Sphingius species from Thailand

Scientific classification
- Kingdom: Animalia
- Phylum: Arthropoda
- Subphylum: Chelicerata
- Class: Arachnida
- Order: Araneae
- Infraorder: Araneomorphae
- Family: Liocranidae
- Genus: Sphingius; Thorell, 1890

Type species
- Sphingius thecatus Thorell, 1890

Species
- See text

Diversity
- 27 species

= Sphingius =

Genus of spiders

Sphingius is a genus of araneomorph spiders in the family Liocranidae, containing 27 species restricted to South Asia and Southeast Asia.

== Species ==
- Sphingius barkudensis Gravely, 1931 – Bangladesh, India
- Sphingius bifurcatus Dankittipakul, Tavano & Singtripop, 2011 – Thailand, Malaysia
- Sphingius bilineatus Simon, 1906 – India
- Sphingius caniceps Simon, 1906 – India
- Sphingius deelemanae Zhang & Fu, 2010 – China
- Sphingius elongatus Dankittipakul, Tavano & Singtripop, 2011 – Thailand
- Sphingius gothicus Deeleman-Reinhold, 2001 – Thailand
- Sphingius gracilis (Thorell, 1895) – China, Myanmar
- Sphingius hainan Zhang, Fu & Zhu, 2009 – China
- Sphingius kambakamensis Gravely, 1931 – India
- Sphingius longipes Gravely, 1931 – India
- Sphingius nilgiriensis Gravely, 1931 – India
- Sphingius octomaculatus Deeleman-Reinhold, 2001 – Thailand
- Sphingius paltaensis Biswas & Biswas, 1992 – India
- Sphingius penicillus Deeleman-Reinhold, 2001 – Thailand
- Sphingius prolixus Dankittipakul, Tavano & Singtripop, 2011 – Thailand
- Sphingius punctatus Deeleman-Reinhold, 2001 – Thailand to Lesser Sunda Is.
- Sphingius rama Dankittipakul, Tavano & Singtripop, 2011 – Thailand
- Sphingius scrobiculatus Thorell, 1897 – China, Taiwan, Myanmar, Thailand
- Sphingius scutatus Simon, 1897 – Sri Lanka
- Sphingius songi Deeleman-Reinhold, 2001 – Thailand
- Sphingius spinosus Dankittipakul, Tavano & Singtripop, 2011 – Thailand, Malaysia, Sumatra
- Sphingius superbus Dankittipakul, Tavano & Singtripop, 2011 – Thailand, Malaysia
- Sphingius thecatus Thorell, 1890^{T} – Malaysia
- Sphingius tristiculus Simon, 1903 – Vietnam
- Sphingius vivax (Thorell, 1897) – Myanmar, Thailand, Vietnam, Malaysia, Philippines
- Sphingius zhangi Zhang, Fu & Zhu, 2009 – China
