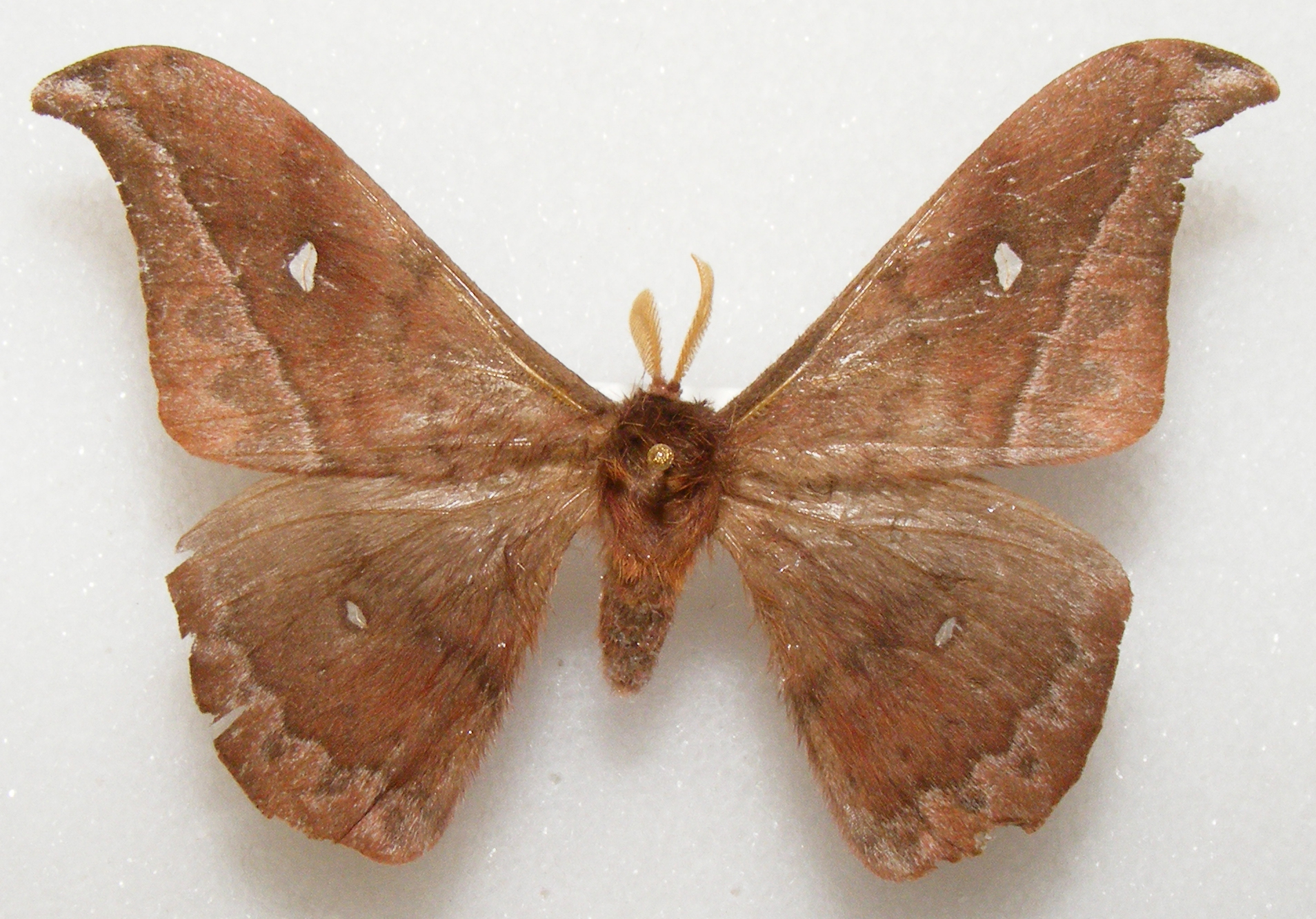
- Copaxa cydippe

Scientific classification
- Domain: Eukaryota
- Kingdom: Animalia
- Phylum: Arthropoda
- Class: Insecta
- Order: Lepidoptera
- Family: Saturniidae
- Tribe: Saturniini
- Genus: Copaxa; Walker, 1855

Synonyms
- Sagana Walker, 1855; Saturniodes Jordan, 1911

= Copaxa =

Genus of moths

Copaxa is a genus of moths in the family Saturniidae first described by Francis Walker in 1855.

== Species ==
The following species are recognised in the genus :

- Copaxa amazpandens
- Copaxa andensis Lemaire, 1971
- Copaxa andescens
- Copaxa andorientalis
- Copaxa anikae Brechlin & Meister, 2010
- Copaxa antiollita
- Copaxa apollinairei Lemaire, 1978
- Copaxa apollonairei Lemaire, 1978
- Copaxa arianae
- Copaxa australoescalantei Brechlin & Meister, 2010
- Copaxa bachuea Wolfe, 2005
- Copaxa bella Naumann, Brosch, Wenczel & Nässig, 2005
- Copaxa belloidea
- Copaxa birena Bénéluz, 2008
- Copaxa brunneocaeca
- Copaxa cabrera
- Copaxa canella Walker, 1855
- Copaxa carolinae Brechlin, Käch & Meister, 2011
- Copaxa chimaltenangensis
- Copaxa chrisbrechlinae
- Copaxa chrisbrechlini Brechlin & Meister, 2010
- Copaxa cineracea Rothschild, 1895
- Copaxa conlani Brechlin & Meister, 2010
- Copaxa copaxoides Dyar, 1912
- Copaxa corralesi
- Copaxa curvilinea Schaus, 1912
- Copaxa cuscoandensis Brechlin & Meister, 2010
- Copaxa cuscoexpandens Brechlin & Meister, 2010
- Copaxa cydiphondurensis
- Copaxa cydippe Druce, 1894
- Copaxa cydippueblensis
- Copaxa dagmarae
- Copaxa decrescens Walker, 1855
- Copaxa denda Druce, 1894
- Copaxa dendoidea
- Copaxa denhezi Lemaire, 1971
- Copaxa escalantei Lemaire, 1971
- Copaxa evelynae Wolfe & Lemaire, 1993
- Copaxa expandens Walker, 1855
- Copaxa flavina Draudt, 1929
- Copaxa flavobrunnea Bouvier, 1930
- Copaxa gachala
- Copaxa garciorum Brechlin & Meister, 2010
- Copaxa graveroni
- Copaxa guamaniana
- Copaxa haxairei Herbin, 2009
- Copaxa herbuloti Lemaire, 1971
- Copaxa hondfenestrata
- Copaxa ignescens Lemaire, 1978
- Copaxa intermediata Wolfe, 2005
- Copaxa intii
- Copaxa joinvillea Schaus, 1921
- Copaxa kaechi
- Copaxa kitchingi Brechlin & Meister, 2010
- Copaxa knorkei
- Copaxa koenigi Lemaire, 1974
- Copaxa lavendera Westwood, 1853
- Copaxa lavenderoguatemalensis Brechlin & Meister, 2010
- Copaxa lavenderohidalgensis Brechlin & Meister, 2010
- Copaxa lavenderohondurensis
- Copaxa lavenderojaliscensis Brechlin & Meister, 2010
- Copaxa litensis Wolfe & Conlan, 2002
- Copaxa luedtkei
- Copaxa lunula Wolfe & Conlan, 2003
- Copaxa machadoi
- Copaxa madrediosiana Brechlin & Meister, 2010
- Copaxa mannana Dyar, 1914
- Copaxa marona Schaus, 1906
- Copaxa marquezae
- Copaxa mazaorum Lemaire, 1982
- Copaxa medea Maassen, 1890
- Copaxa metescens
- Copaxa mexcentralis
- Copaxa mielkeorum Brechlin & Meister, 2010
- Copaxa miranda Lemaire, 1971
- Copaxa moinieri Lemaire, 1974
- Copaxa mornieri Lemaire, 1974
- Copaxa muellerana Dyar, 1920
- Copaxa multifenestrata Herrich-Schäffer, 1858
- Copaxa nadari Bouvier, 1929
- Copaxa novocineracea Brechlin & Meister, 2009
- Copaxa ockendeni Druce, 1906
- Copaxa orientalis Lemaire, 1975
- Copaxa pararufinans Brechlin & Meister, 2010
- Copaxa parexpandens
- Copaxa parvohidalgensis Brechlin & Meister, 2010
- Copaxa pascoandensis Brechlin & Meister, 2010
- Copaxa peggyae Brechlin & Meister, 2013
- Copaxa purulhensis
- Copaxa rudloffi Brechlin & Meister, 2010
- Copaxa rufa Draudt, 1929
- Copaxa rufijaliscensis Brechlin & Meister, 2010
- Copaxa rufimichoacanensis Brechlin & Meister, 2010
- Copaxa rufinans Schaus, 1906
- Copaxa rufotincta Rothschild, 1895
- Copaxa rufstralica
- Copaxa sanmarcosiana
- Copaxa sapatoza Westwood, 1854
- Copaxa satellita
- Copaxa satellitia Walker, 1865
- Copaxa satellitoidea
- Copaxa satipoexpandens Brechlin & Meister, 2010
- Copaxa schmiti Brechlin & Meister, 2010
- Copaxa semioculata C.Felder & R.Felder, 1874
- Copaxa simoni Brechlin, Käch & Meister, 2011
- Copaxa simson Maassen & Weymer, 1881
- Copaxa sinjaevi Brechlin & Meister, 2010
- Copaxa siriae
- Copaxa sophronia Schaus, 1921
- Copaxa svetlanae
- Copaxa syntheratoides Rothschild, 1895
- Copaxa troetschi Druce, 1886
- Copaxa trottierorum Bénéluz, 1986
- Copaxa vanschaycki Brechlin & Meister, 2010
- Copaxa virgensis
- Copaxa wernermeisteri Brechlin & Meister, 2010
- Copaxa winbrechlini Brechlin, Käch & Meister, 2010
- Copaxa winbrechliniani
- Copaxa witti
- Copaxa wittiana
- Copaxa wolfei Meister, Naumann, Brosch & Wenczel, 2005
- Copaxa yarumala
- Copaxa yungallita
- Copaxa yungaskoenigoides Brechlin & Meister, 2010
- Copaxa yungaspandens Brechlin & Meister, 2010
- Copaxa yungescens Brechlin & Meister, 2010
- BOLD:AAA2516 (Copaxa sp.)
- BOLD:AAA6787 (Copaxa sp.)
- BOLD:AAB5784 (Copaxa sp.)
- BOLD:AAB6228 (Copaxa sp.)
- BOLD:AAB6260 (Copaxa sp.)
- BOLD:AAB7902 (Copaxa sp.)
- BOLD:ACE2986 (Copaxa sp.)
- BOLD:ACE3736 (Copaxa sp.)
- BOLD:ACF5336 (Copaxa sp.)
