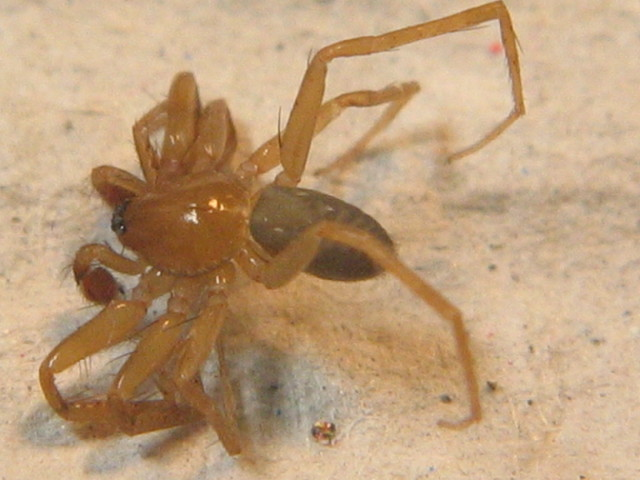
- A. fuscus, adult male

Scientific classification
- Kingdom: Animalia
- Phylum: Arthropoda
- Subphylum: Chelicerata
- Class: Arachnida
- Order: Araneae
- Infraorder: Araneomorphae
- Family: Liocranidae
- Genus: Apostenus; Westring, 1851

Type species
- A. fuscus Westring, 1851

Species
- 13, see text

= Apostenus =

Apostenus Temporal range: Palaeogene– Present

Genus of spiders

Apostenus is a genus of liocranid sac spiders that was first described by Niklas Westring in 1851.

== Species ==
As of September 2019 it contains thirteen species, found in Europe, Africa, Canada, the United States, and Karakorum:

- Apostenus algericus Bosmans, 1999 – Algeria
- Apostenus annulipedes Wunderlich, 1987 – Canary Is.
- Apostenus annulipes Caporiacco, 1935 – Karakorum
- Apostenus californicus Ubick & Vetter, 2005 – USA
- Apostenus crespoi Lissner, 2017 – Portugal
- Apostenus ducati Bennett, Copley & Copley, 2013 – USA, Canada
- Apostenus fuscus Westring, 1851 (type) – Europe
- Apostenus gomerensis Wunderlich, 1992 – Canary Is.
- Apostenus grancanariensis Wunderlich, 1992 – Canary Is.
- Apostenus humilis Simon, 1932 – Portugal, Spain, France
- Apostenus maroccanus Bosmans, 1999 – Morocco
- Apostenus ochraceus Hadjissarantos, 1940 – Greece
- Apostenus palmensis Wunderlich, 1992 – Canary Is.
