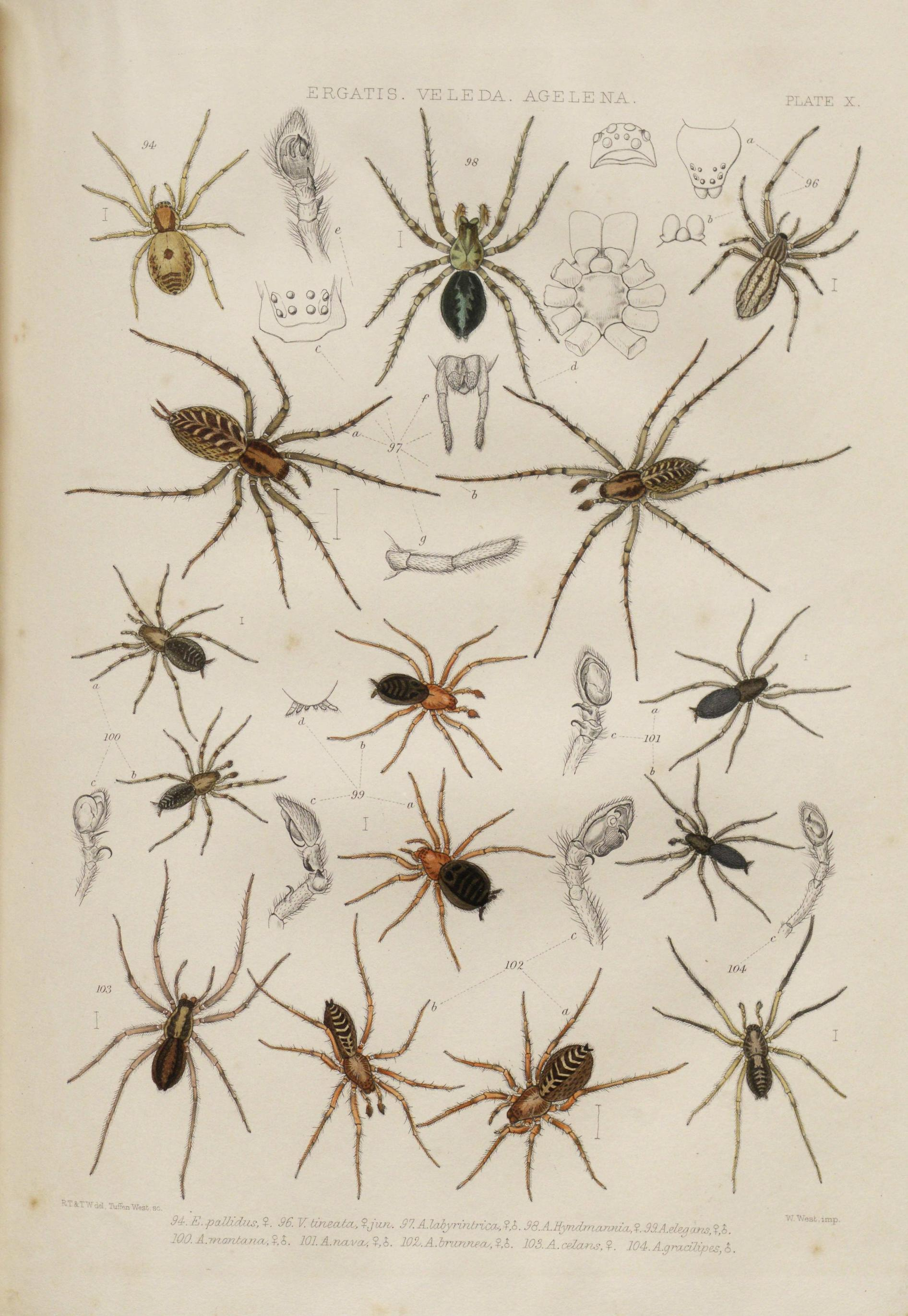
- Scotina celans figure 103, Scotina gracilipes figure 104.

Scientific classification
- Kingdom: Animalia
- Phylum: Arthropoda
- Subphylum: Chelicerata
- Class: Arachnida
- Order: Araneae
- Infraorder: Araneomorphae
- Family: Liocranidae
- Genus: Scotina; Menge, 1873

Type species
- Scotina gracilipes (Blackwall, 1859)

= Scotina =

Genus of spiders

Scotina is a genus of sac spiders of the family Liocranidae which was named by the German zoologist Franz Anton Menge in 1873 with Scotina gracilipes as the type species. Scotina was thought to be a mainly Western Palearctic genus but one species, Scotina palliardi, was found in Korea in 2011. The species in the genus Scotina are small spiders which have six to ten pairs of ventral spines which can be seen using a lens. They have a darker and shinier cephalothorax than in other genera within the Liocranidae. They also have light brown femora with the more distal segments of the legs being darker, especially on the first pairs. They are terrestrial spiders which are mainly found among moss and litter on the ground.

== Species ==
Four species are currently listed as valid in the World Spider Catalog.

- Scotina celans (Blackwall, 1841) – Europe, Algeria, Russia
- Scotina gracilipes (Blackwall, 1859) – Europe
- Scotina occulta Kritscher, 1996 – Malta
- Scotina palliardii (L. Koch, 1881) – Europe, Russia, Korea
