= Andromma =

Scientific classification
- Kingdom: Animalia
- Phylum: Arthropoda
- Subphylum: Chelicerata
- Class: Arachnida
- Order: Araneae
- Infraorder: Araneomorphae
- Family: Liocranidae
- Genus: Andromma; Simon, 1893

Type species
- Andromma aethiopicum Simon, 1893

Species
- 23, see text

Genus of spiders

Andromma is a genus of spiders in the family Liocranidae. It was first described in 1893 by Eugène Simon.

== Species ==
As of October 2025, this genus includes 23 species:

- Andromma aethiopicum Simon, 1893 – Ethiopia (type species)
- Andromma albinovani Bosselaers & Jocqué, 2022 – Ivory Coast
- Andromma alvoculatum Bosselaers & Jocqué, 2022 – DR Congo
- Andromma anacardium Bosselaers & Jocqué, 2022 – Ethiopia
- Andromma anochetorum Simon, 1909 – Gabon
- Andromma bouvieri Fage, 1936 – Kenya
- Andromma cyamos Bosselaers & Jocqué, 2022 – DR Congo
- Andromma cycnotrachelos Bosselaers & Jocqué, 2022 – DR Congo
- Andromma delphiurum Bosselaers & Jocqué, 2022 – Nigeria
- Andromma deogratias Bosselaers & Jocqué, 2022 – Burundi
- Andromma dicranobelos Bosselaers & Jocqué, 2022 – DR Congo
- Andromma didrepanum Bosselaers & Jocqué, 2022 – DR Congo
- Andromma divinagraciae Bosselaers & Jocqué, 2022 – Burundi
- Andromma elephantactes Bosselaers & Jocqué, 2022 – Ivory Coast
- Andromma ghesquierei Bosselaers & Jocqué, 2022 – DR Congo
- Andromma heligmos Bosselaers & Jocqué, 2022 – DR Congo
- Andromma helix Bosselaers & Jocqué, 2022 – Ivory Coast
- Andromma juakalyi Bosselaers & Jocqué, 2022 – DR Congo
- Andromma katangense Bosselaers & Jocqué, 2022 – DR Congo
- Andromma ophiophagum Bosselaers & Jocqué, 2022 – DR Congo, Burundi
- Andromma prosopion Bosselaers & Jocqué, 2022 – Cameroon
- Andromma raffrayi Simon, 1899 – Namibia, Mozambique, South Africa
- Andromma velum Bosselaers & Jocqué, 2022 – Malawi
