= Drapeta =

Scientific classification
- Domain: Eukaryota
- Kingdom: Animalia
- Phylum: Arthropoda
- Subphylum: Chelicerata
- Class: Arachnida
- Order: Araneae
- Infraorder: Araneomorphae
- Family: Liocranidae
- Genus: Drapeta; Menge, 1875

Type species
- Drapeta rutilans (Thorell, 1875) ≡ Sagana rutilans Thorell, 1875

Species
- See text.

Synonyms
- Sagana Thorell, 1875, junior homonym, not Sagana Walker, 1855

Genus of spiders

Drapeta is a genus of spiders in the family Liocranidae, found from Europe to the Caucasus. It was for a long time incorrectly known by the name Sagana Thorell, 1875, a junior homonym of Sagana Walker, 1855, a moth genus.

== Taxonomy ==
The taxonomic history of the genus Drapeta is somewhat complicated. In a publication dated 1874, but considered to have been published in 1875, Anton Menge erected the genus Drapeta with the sole species Drapeta aeneus. Also in 1875, Tamerlan Thorell erected the genus Sagana with the sole species Sagana rutilans. However, the genus name Sagana was not available because of the previously published moth genus Sagana Walker, 1855, although this appears not to have been noticed until very much later. In 1878, Simon transferred Thorell's Sagana rutilans to Liocranum rutilans. (This placement was almost always used until 2008, when Jörg Wunderlich again separated this species from Liocranum.) In 1880, Philipp Bertkau synonymized Thorell's Sagana rutilans and Menge's Drapeta aeneus. He noted that he was unable to determine the order in which the two names were published (i.e. their priority), but chose to use Thorell's name because of the possible confusion of Drapeta with Drapetis and Drapetes (genera of insects). In 2024, realizing that Sagana was not available, and accepting that Sagana rutilans and Drapeta aeneus were synonyms, Seropian et al. resurrected Drapeta, with the type species given as Drapeta rutilans (Thorell, 1875), a synonym of Drapeta aeneus Menge, 1875.

=== Species ===
As of January 2025, the World Spider Catalog accepted the following extant species:

- Drapeta caucasicus Seropian, Bulbulashvili & Krammer, 2024 – Caucasus (Russia, Georgia)
- Drapeta concolor (Simon, 1878) – France (Corsica)
- Drapeta rutilans (Thorell, 1875) – Europe (type species)
