= Arabelia =

Scientific classification
- Kingdom: Animalia
- Phylum: Arthropoda
- Subphylum: Chelicerata
- Class: Arachnida
- Order: Araneae
- Infraorder: Araneomorphae
- Family: Liocranidae
- Genus: Arabelia
- Species: A. pheidoleicomes

Binomial name
- Arabelia pheidoleicomes Bosselaers, 2009

Genus of spiders

Arabelia is a genus of spiders in the family Liocranidae. It was first described in 2009 by Bosselaers. As of 2017, it contains only one species, Arabelia pheidoleicomes, found in Greece and Turkey.
