= Cteniogaster =

Scientific classification
- Kingdom: Animalia
- Phylum: Arthropoda
- Subphylum: Chelicerata
- Class: Arachnida
- Order: Araneae
- Infraorder: Araneomorphae
- Family: Liocranidae
- Genus: Cteniogaster; Jocqué

Type species
- Cteniogaster toxarchus

Species
- 7, see text

Genus of spiders

Cteniogaster is a genus of spiders in the family Liocranidae. It was first described in 2013 by Bosselaers & Jocqué. As of 2017, it contains 7 African species.

== Species ==
Cteniogaster comprises the following species:

- Cteniogaster conviva Bosselaers & Jocqué, 2013
- Cteniogaster hexomma Bosselaers & Jocqué, 2013
- Cteniogaster lampropus Bosselaers & Jocqué, 2013
- Cteniogaster nana Bosselaers & Jocqué, 2013
- Cteniogaster sangarawe Bosselaers & Jocqué, 2013
- Cteniogaster taxorchis Bosselaers & Jocqué, 2013
- Cteniogaster toxarchus Bosselaers & Jocqué, 2013
