= Vankeeria =

Scientific classification
- Kingdom: Animalia
- Phylum: Arthropoda
- Subphylum: Chelicerata
- Class: Arachnida
- Order: Araneae
- Infraorder: Araneomorphae
- Family: Liocranidae
- Genus: Vankeeria
- Species: V. catoptronifera

Binomial name
- Vankeeria catoptronifera Bosselaers, 2012

Genus of spiders

Vankeeria is a genus of spiders in the family Liocranidae. First described in 2012 by Bosselaers, it contains only one species As of 2017, Vankeeria catoptronifera, found in Greece.
