= Paratus =

Scientific classification
- Kingdom: Animalia
- Phylum: Arthropoda
- Subphylum: Chelicerata
- Class: Arachnida
- Order: Araneae
- Infraorder: Araneomorphae
- Family: Liocranidae
- Genus: Paratus; Simon, 1898

Type species
- Paratus reticulatus Simon, 1898

Species
- See text

Diversity
- 5 species

Genus of spiders

Paratus is a genus of araneomorph spiders in the family Liocranidae, containing five species restricted to India, Sri Lanka and China.

== Species ==
- Paratus halabala Zapata & Ramírez, 2010 – Thailand
- Paratus hamatus Mu & Zhang, 2018 – China
- Paratus indicus Marusik, Zheng & Li, 2008 – India
- Paratus kentingensis Mu & Zhang, 2018 – Taiwan
- Paratus longlingensis Zhao & Peng, 2013 – China
- Paratus perus Sankaran, Malamel, Joseph & Sebastian, 2017 – India
- Paratus reticulatus Simon, 1898^{T} – Sri Lanka
- Paratus sinensis Marusik, Zheng & Li, 2008 – China
