= Mesobria =

Scientific classification
- Kingdom: Animalia
- Phylum: Arthropoda
- Subphylum: Chelicerata
- Class: Arachnida
- Order: Araneae
- Infraorder: Araneomorphae
- Family: Liocranidae
- Genus: Mesobria
- Species: M. guttata

Binomial name
- Mesobria guttata Simon, 1898

Genus of spiders

Mesobria is a genus of spiders in the family Liocranidae. It was first described in 1898 by Simon. As of 2017, it contains only one species, Mesobria guttata, found on St. Vincent.
