= Xenoplectus =

Scientific classification
- Kingdom: Animalia
- Phylum: Arthropoda
- Subphylum: Chelicerata
- Class: Arachnida
- Order: Araneae
- Infraorder: Araneomorphae
- Family: Liocranidae
- Genus: Xenoplectus; Schiapelli & Gerschman, 1958
- Species: X. armatus

Binomial name
- Xenoplectus armatus Schiapelli & Gerschman, 1958

Genus of spiders

Xenoplectus is a monotypic genus of South American liocranid sac spiders containing the single species, Xenoplectus armatus. It was first described by R. D. Schiapelli & B. S. Gerschman de P. in 1958, and has only been found in Argentina.
