= Argistes =

Scientific classification
- Kingdom: Animalia
- Phylum: Arthropoda
- Subphylum: Chelicerata
- Class: Arachnida
- Order: Araneae
- Infraorder: Araneomorphae
- Family: Liocranidae
- Genus: Argistes; Thorell, 1878

Type species
- Argistes velox Simon, 1897

Species
- See text

Genus of spiders

Argistes is a genus of araneomorph spiders in the family Liocranidae, containing three species restricted to Sri Lanka and Namibia.

== Species ==
- Argistes africanus Simon, 1910 — Namibia
- Argistes seriatus (Karsch, 1892) — Sri Lanka
- Argistes velox Simon, 1897 — Sri Lanka
