= Koppe =

Scientific classification
- Domain: Eukaryota
- Kingdom: Animalia
- Phylum: Arthropoda
- Subphylum: Chelicerata
- Class: Arachnida
- Order: Araneae
- Infraorder: Araneomorphae
- Family: Liocranidae
- Genus: Koppe; Deeleman-Reinhold, 2001

Type species
- K. montana Deeleman-Reinhold, 2001

Species
- 13, see text

Genus of spiders

Koppe is a genus of liocranid sac spiders first described by Christa L. Deeleman-Reinhold in 2001.

== Species ==
As of April 2019 it contains thirteen species throughout Southeast Asia:

- Koppe armata (Simon, 1896) – Sri Lanka
- Koppe baerti Deeleman-Reinhold, 2001 – Indonesia (Sulawesi)
- Koppe calciphila Deeleman-Reinhold, 2001 – Indonesia (Sulawesi)
- Koppe doleschalli Deeleman-Reinhold, 2001 – Indonesia (Moluccas)
- Koppe kinabalensis Deeleman-Reinhold, 2001 – Borneo
- Koppe kuntneri Deeleman-Reinhold, 2001 – Indonesia (Moluccas)
- Koppe minuta Deeleman-Reinhold, 2001 – Indonesia (Java, Sumatra)
- Koppe montana Deeleman-Reinhold, 2001 (type) – Indonesia (Java)
- Koppe no Deeleman-Reinhold, 2001 – Indonesia (Sulawesi)
- Koppe princeps Deeleman-Reinhold, 2001 – Indonesia (Sulawesi)
- Koppe radiata (Thorell, 1881) – New Guinea
- Koppe sumba Deeleman-Reinhold, 2001 – Indonesia (Lesser Sunda Is.)
- Koppe tinikitkita (Barrion & Litsinger, 1995) – Philippines
