= Plotnick =

Plotnick and Plotnik are Russian-language occupational surnames literally meaning "carpenter" in Russian. The surname may refer to:

== Plotnick ==
- Jack Plotnick, American film and television actor, writer, and producer
- Danny Plotnick, American independent filmmaker

== Plotnik ==
- Joel Plotnik, drummer with the American indie electro-pop band Monarch
- Ravid Plotnik, Israeli singer and rapper
- Robert Plotnik, American record-shop owner
