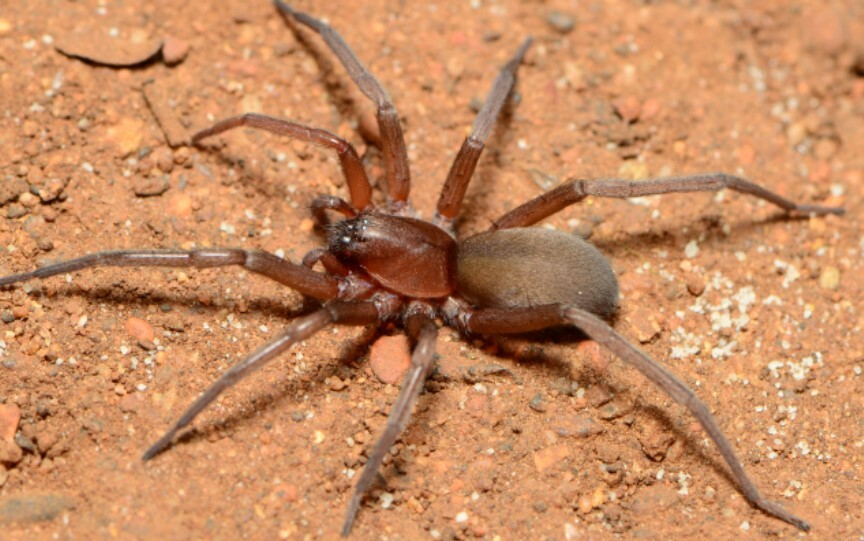
- Female
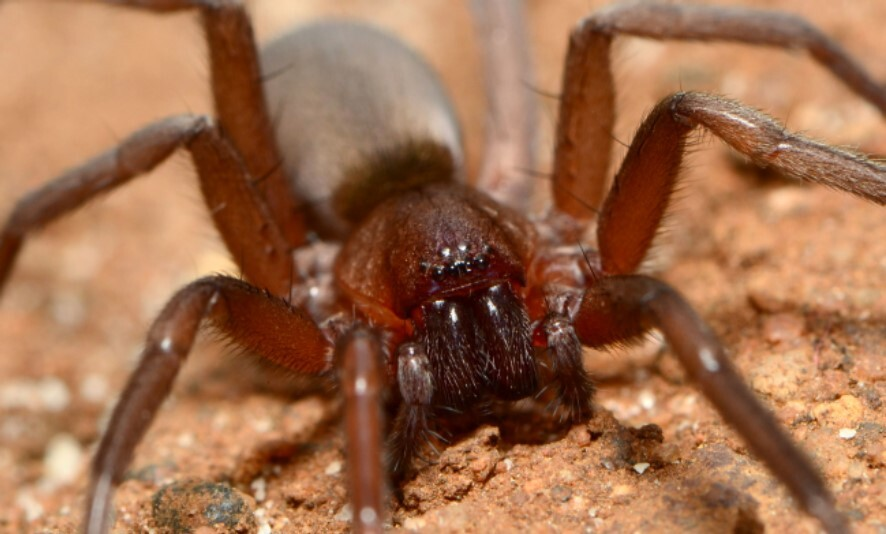
- Female

Scientific classification
- Kingdom: Animalia
- Phylum: Arthropoda
- Subphylum: Chelicerata
- Class: Arachnida
- Order: Araneae
- Infraorder: Araneomorphae
- Family: Liocranidae
- Genus: Rhaeboctesis
- Species: R. transvaalensis

Binomial name
- Rhaeboctesis transvaalensis Tucker, 1920

= Rhaeboctesis transvaalensis =

Transvaal Rhaeboctesis Sac Spider

Species of spider

Rhaeboctesis transvaalensis is a species of spider in the family Liocranidae. It is endemic to South Africa and is commonly known as the Transvaal Rhaeboctesis sac spider.

== Distribution ==
Rhaeboctesis transvaalensis is found in the South African provinces Free State, Gauteng, Limpopo, and Mpumalanga. Notable locations include Bloemfontein, Johannesburg, Klipriviersberg Nature Reserve, and the Springbok Flats region.

== Habitat and ecology ==
The species inhabits Grassland and Savanna biomes at altitudes ranging from 1,328 to 1,762 m above sea level. These are free-running ground spiders.

== Conservation ==
Rhaeboctesis transvaalensis is listed as Least Concern due to its wide geographical range. The species is protected in the Klipriviersberg Nature Reserve, and threats to this species are not considered significant.

== Taxonomy ==
The species was originally described by Tucker in 1920 from Florida in Gauteng. The genus remains unrevised.
