= Cybaeodes =

Scientific classification
- Kingdom: Animalia
- Phylum: Arthropoda
- Subphylum: Chelicerata
- Class: Arachnida
- Order: Araneae
- Infraorder: Araneomorphae
- Family: Liocranidae
- Genus: Cybaeodes; Simon

Type species
- Cybaeodes testaceus

Species
- 13, see text

Genus of spiders

Cybaeodes is a genus of spiders in the family Liocranidae. It was first described in 1878 by Simon. As of 2017, it contains 13 species from southern Europe and north Africa.

== Species ==
Cybaeodes comprises the following species:

- Cybaeodes alicatai Platnick & Di Franco, 1992
- Cybaeodes avolensis Platnick & Di Franco, 1992
- Cybaeodes carusoi Platnick & Di Franco, 1992
- Cybaeodes dosaguas Ribera & De Mas, 2015
- Cybaeodes indalo Ribera & De Mas, 2015
- Cybaeodes liocraninus (Simon, 1913)
- Cybaeodes madidus Simon, 1914
- Cybaeodes magnus Ribera & De Mas, 2015
- Cybaeodes mallorcensis Wunderlich, 2008
- Cybaeodes marinae Di Franco, 1989
- Cybaeodes molara (Roewer, 1960)
- Cybaeodes sardus Platnick & Di Franco, 1992
- Cybaeodes testaceus Simon, 1878
