= Hesperocranum =

Scientific classification
- Kingdom: Animalia
- Phylum: Arthropoda
- Subphylum: Chelicerata
- Class: Arachnida
- Order: Araneae
- Infraorder: Araneomorphae
- Family: Liocranidae
- Genus: Hesperocranum
- Species: H. rothi

Binomial name
- Hesperocranum rothi Ubick & Platnick, 1991

Genus of spiders

Hesperocranum is a genus of spiders in the family Liocranidae. It was first described in 1991 by Ubick & Platnick. As of 2017, it contains only one species, Hesperocranum rothi, found in the U.S.
