= Jacaena =

Scientific classification
- Kingdom: Animalia
- Phylum: Arthropoda
- Subphylum: Chelicerata
- Class: Arachnida
- Order: Araneae
- Infraorder: Araneomorphae
- Family: Liocranidae
- Genus: Jacaena; Thorell, 1897

Type species
- J. distincta Thorell, 1897

Species
- 11, see text

Genus of spiders

Jacaena is a genus of Asian liocranid sac spiders first described by Tamerlan Thorell in 1897.

== Species ==
As of April 2019 it contains eleven species:

- Jacaena angoonae Dankittipakul, Tavano & Singtripop, 2013 – Thailand
- Jacaena distincta Thorell, 1897 (type) – Myanmar
- Jacaena erawan (Deeleman-Reinhold, 2001) – Thailand
- Jacaena lunulata Dankittipakul, Tavano & Singtripop, 2013 – Thailand
- Jacaena mihun Deeleman-Reinhold, 2001 – Thailand
- Jacaena peculiaris Dankittipakul, Tavano & Singtripop, 2013 – Thailand
- Jacaena punctata Dankittipakul, Tavano & Singtripop, 2013 – Thailand
- Jacaena schwendingeri (Deeleman-Reinhold, 2001) – Thailand
- Jacaena tengchongensis Zhao & Peng, 2013 – China
- Jacaena thakek (Jäger, 2007) – Laos
- Jacaena zhui (Zhang & Fu, 2011) – China, Thailand
