= Sudharmia =

Scientific classification
- Domain: Eukaryota
- Kingdom: Animalia
- Phylum: Arthropoda
- Subphylum: Chelicerata
- Class: Arachnida
- Order: Araneae
- Infraorder: Araneomorphae
- Family: Liocranidae
- Genus: Sudharmia; Deeleman-Reinhold

Species
- Sudharmia beroni Deeleman-Reinhold, 2001; Sudharmia pongorum Deeleman-Reinhold, 2001; Sudharmia tridenticula Dankittipakul & Deeleman-Reinhold, 2012

Genus of spiders

Sudharmia is a genus of spiders in the family Liocranidae. It was first described in 2001 by Deeleman-Reinhold. As of 2016, it contains three species, all found in Sumatra.
