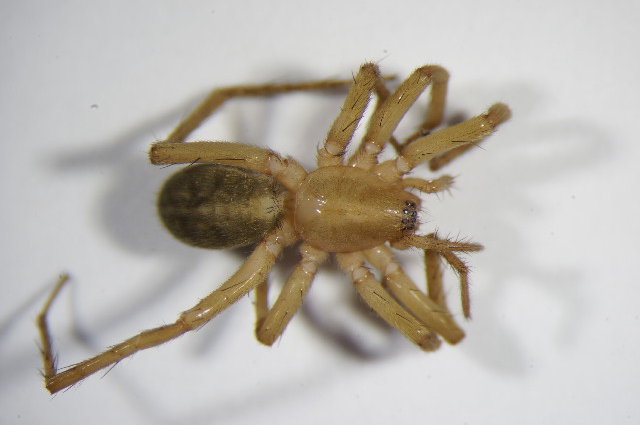
- L. striata, adult female

Scientific classification
- Kingdom: Animalia
- Phylum: Arthropoda
- Subphylum: Chelicerata
- Class: Arachnida
- Order: Araneae
- Infraorder: Araneomorphae
- Family: Liocranidae
- Genus: Liocranoeca; Wunderlich, 1999

Type species
- L. striata (Kulczyński, 1882)

Species
- 4, see text

= Liocranoeca =

Genus of spiders

Liocranoeca is a genus of liocranid sac spiders that was first described by J. Wunderlich in 1999.

== Species ==
As of September 2019 it contains four species, found in Europe, Siberia, and the United States:

- Liocranoeca emertoni (Kaston, 1938) – USA
- Liocranoeca spasskyi Ponomarev, 2007 – Ukraine, Russia (Europe)
- Liocranoeca striata (Kulczyński, 1882) (type) – Europe, Russia (Europe to South Siberia)
- Liocranoeca vjosensis Komnenov, 2018 – Albania
