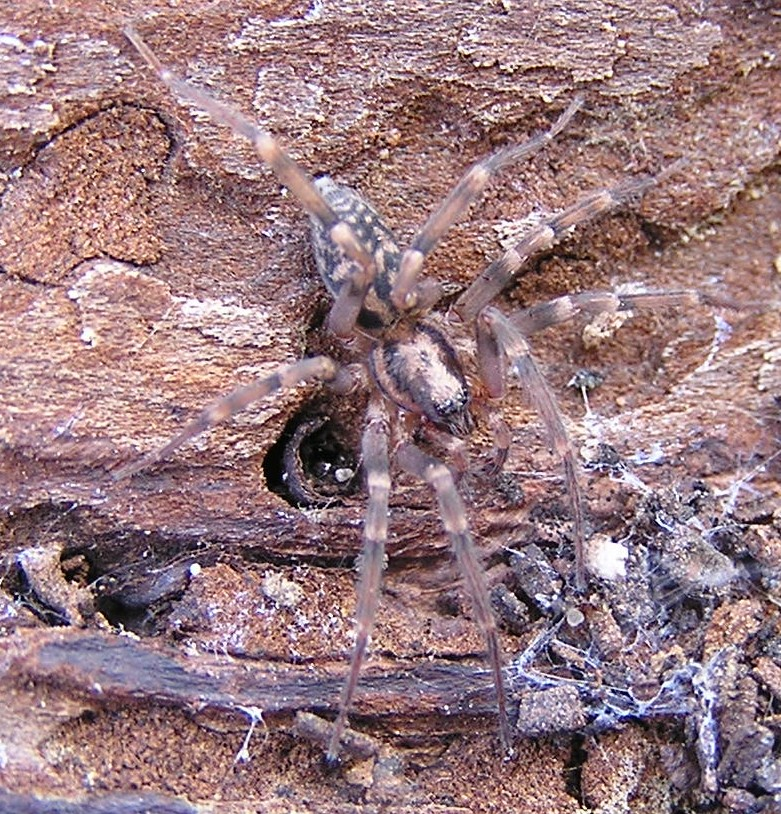
- Liocranum rupicola in a mixed forest in Hambach, Germany

Scientific classification
- Domain: Eukaryota
- Kingdom: Animalia
- Phylum: Arthropoda
- Subphylum: Chelicerata
- Class: Arachnida
- Order: Araneae
- Infraorder: Araneomorphae
- Family: Liocranidae
- Genus: Liocranum
- Species: L. rupicola

Binomial name
- Liocranum rupicola Walckenaer, 1830

Synonyms
- Clubiona domestica; Clubiona rupicola; Liocranum domesticum; Philoica notata; Tegenaria notata

= Liocranum rupicola =

Species of spider

Liocranum rupicola is a species of spider in the family Liocranidae. It is found in Europe and Russia, and was first described by Charles Athanase Walckenaer in 1830.
