= Liparochrysis =

Scientific classification
- Kingdom: Animalia
- Phylum: Arthropoda
- Subphylum: Chelicerata
- Class: Arachnida
- Order: Araneae
- Infraorder: Araneomorphae
- Family: Liocranidae
- Genus: Liparochrysis
- Species: L. resplendens

Binomial name
- Liparochrysis resplendens Simon, 1909

Genus of spiders

Liparochrysis is a genus of spiders in the family Liocranidae. It was first described in 1909 by Simon. As of 2017, it contains only one species, Liparochrysis resplendens, found in western Australia.
