= Coryssiphus praeustus =

Scientific classification
- Kingdom: Animalia
- Phylum: Arthropoda
- Subphylum: Chelicerata
- Class: Arachnida
- Order: Araneae
- Infraorder: Araneomorphae
- Family: Miturgidae
- Genus: Coryssiphus
- Species: C. praeustus

Binomial name
- Coryssiphus praeustus Simon, 1903

Species of spider

Coryssiphus praeustus is a species of spider in the family Miturgidae. It is endemic to South Africa.

== Distribution ==
Coryssiphus praeustus is found only in the Western Cape province of South Africa. The type locality is given as "Cape of Good Hope", and it has been recorded from Table Mountain National Park, including the Orange Kloof area.

== Habitat and ecology ==
The species inhabits Fynbos biomes at 9 m above sea level. These are free-living ground-dwelling spiders.

== Description ==
The species is known from both sexes.

== Conservation ==
Coryssiphus praeustus is listed as Data Deficient due to taxonomic reasons. More sampling is needed to collect additional females and determine the species' range. It is currently protected in Table Mountain National Park.

== Taxonomy ==
The species was originally described by Eugène Simon in 1903 as the type species of the genus Coryssiphus. The genus was transferred from Liocranidae to Miturgidae by Bosselaers in 2024, who also provided the first description of the female.
