= Sesieutes =

Scientific classification
- Kingdom: Animalia
- Phylum: Arthropoda
- Subphylum: Chelicerata
- Class: Arachnida
- Order: Araneae
- Infraorder: Araneomorphae
- Family: Liocranidae
- Genus: Sesieutes; Simon, 1897

Type species
- S. lucens Simon, 1897

Species
- 13, see text

Genus of spiders

Sesieutes is a genus of Asian liocranid sac spiders first described by Eugène Simon in 1897. It was briefly transferred to the Corinnidae in 2013, but was returned a year later due to its similarity and relation to Phrurolithus.

== Species ==
As of April 2019 it contains thirteen species:

- Sesieutes aberrans Dankittipakul & Deeleman-Reinhold, 2013 – Thailand
- Sesieutes abruptus Dankittipakul & Deeleman-Reinhold, 2013 – Malaysia
- Sesieutes apiculatus Dankittipakul & Deeleman-Reinhold, 2013 – Indonesia
- Sesieutes bifidus Dankittipakul & Deeleman-Reinhold, 2013 – Malaysia
- Sesieutes borneensis Deeleman-Reinhold, 2001 – Borneo, Sulawesi, Philippines
- Sesieutes bulbosus Deeleman-Reinhold, 2001 – Borneo
- Sesieutes emancipatus Deeleman-Reinhold, 2001 – Malaysia
- Sesieutes longyangensis Zhao & Peng, 2013 – China
- Sesieutes lucens Simon, 1897 (type) – Malaysia, Singapore
- Sesieutes minor Deeleman-Reinhold, 2001 – Borneo
- Sesieutes minuatus Dankittipakul & Deeleman-Reinhold, 2013 – Thailand
- Sesieutes nitens Deeleman-Reinhold, 2001 – Indonesia (Java, Sumatra)
- Sesieutes scrobiculatus Deeleman-Reinhold, 2001 – Indonesia (Sumatra)
