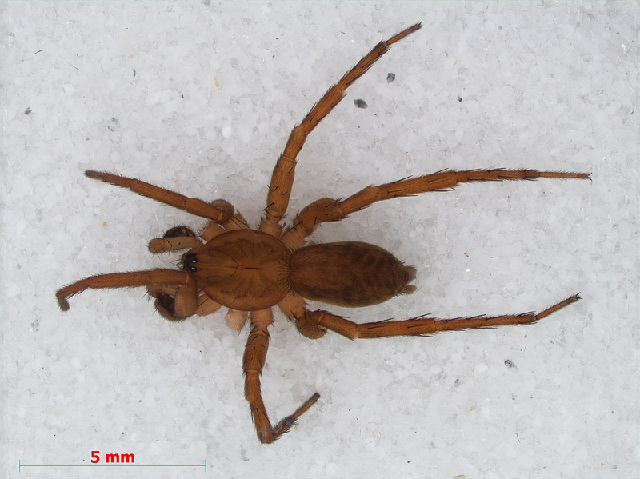
- A. brunnea, adult male
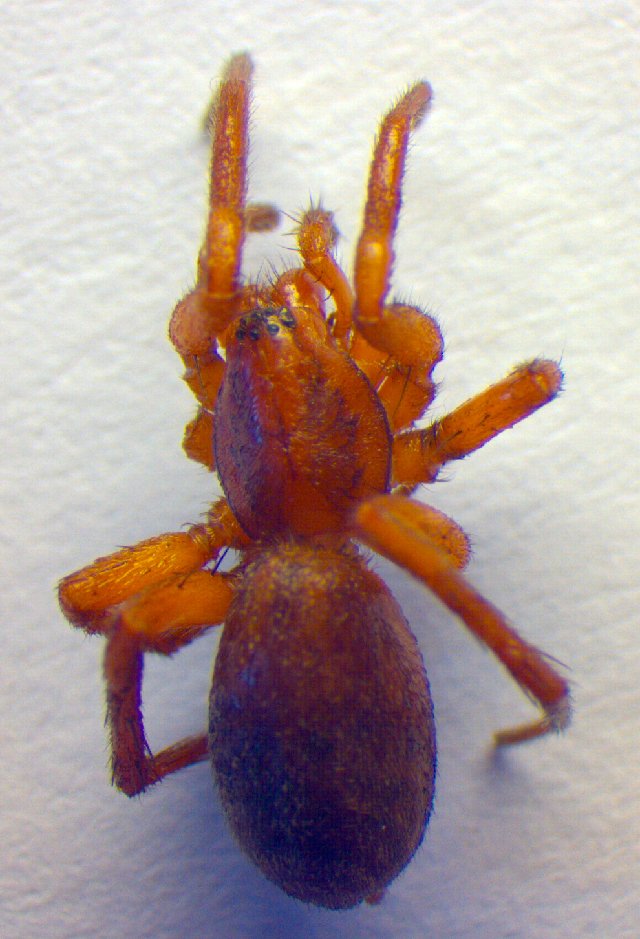
- A. brunnea, adult female

Scientific classification
- Domain: Eukaryota
- Kingdom: Animalia
- Phylum: Arthropoda
- Subphylum: Chelicerata
- Class: Arachnida
- Order: Araneae
- Infraorder: Araneomorphae
- Family: Liocranidae
- Genus: Agroeca
- Species: A. brunnea

Binomial name
- Agroeca brunnea Blackwall, 1833

Synonyms
- Agelena brunnea; Philoica linotina; Agroeca haglundi

= Agroeca brunnea =

Species of spider

Agroeca brunnea is a species of spider in the family Liocranidae. It is found in the Palearctic realm and was first described by John Blackwall in 1833.

The distinctive egg sacs are known colloquially as 'fairy lamps' and the spider itself is sometimes called the 'fairy lamp spider'.

== Gallery ==
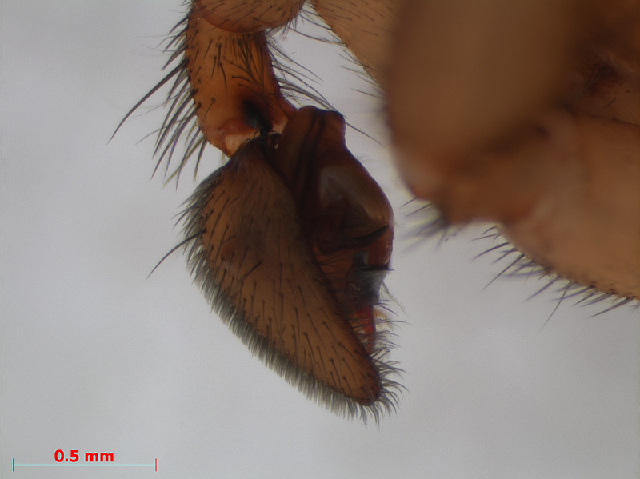
Male pedipalp

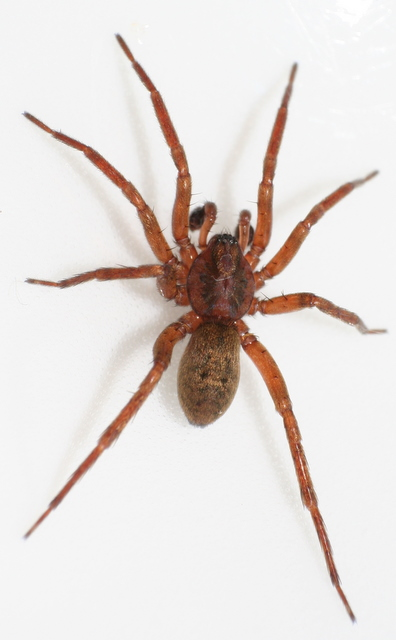
Adult male

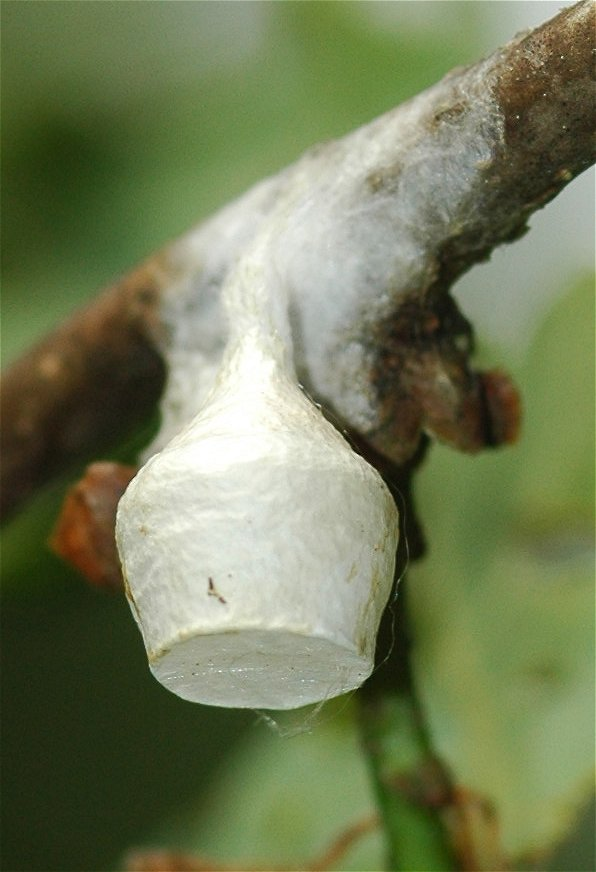
Egg sac
