= Coryssiphus cinerascens =

Scientific classification
- Kingdom: Animalia
- Phylum: Arthropoda
- Subphylum: Chelicerata
- Class: Arachnida
- Order: Araneae
- Infraorder: Araneomorphae
- Family: Miturgidae
- Genus: Coryssiphus
- Species: C. cinerascens

Binomial name
- Coryssiphus cinerascens Simon, 1903

Synonyms
- Coryssiphus unicolor Simon, 1903

Species of spider

Coryssiphus cinerascens is a species of spider in the family Miturgidae. It is endemic to South Africa.

== Distribution ==
Coryssiphus cinerascens is found only in the Western Cape province of South Africa. The type locality is given as "Cape of Good Hope", and it has also been recorded from Kirstenbosch National Botanical Garden.

== Habitat and ecology ==
The species inhabits Fynbos biomes at an altitude of 648 m above sea level. These are free-living ground-dwelling spiders.

== Conservation ==
Coryssiphus cinerascens is listed as Data Deficient due to taxonomic reasons. The female remains unknown, and more sampling is needed to determine the species' range. It is partly protected in the Kirstenbosch National Botanical Garden.

== Taxonomy ==
The species was originally described by Eugène Simon in 1903. Coryssiphus unicolor was also described by Simon in 1903 but was synonymized with C. cinerascens by Bosselaers in 2024. The genus was transferred from Liocranidae to Miturgidae by Bosselaers in 2024.
