= Mesiotelus =

Scientific classification
- Kingdom: Animalia
- Phylum: Arthropoda
- Subphylum: Chelicerata
- Class: Arachnida
- Order: Araneae
- Infraorder: Araneomorphae
- Family: Liocranidae
- Genus: Mesiotelus; Simon, 1897

Type species
- Mesiotelus tenuissimus (L. Koch, 1866)

Species
- 16, see text

Genus of spiders

Mesiotelus is a genus of spiders in the family Liocranidae. It was first described in 1897 by Eugène Simon.

== Species ==
As of May 2022 it contains sixteen species:

- Mesiotelus caucasicus Zamani & Marusik, 2021 – Armenia, Azerbaijan, Iran
- Mesiotelus cyprius Kulczyński, 1908 – Crete, Cyprus
- Mesiotelus deltshevi Naumova, 2020 – Albania
- Mesiotelus grancanariensis Wunderlich, 1992 – Portugal, Canary Is., Madeira
- Mesiotelus kulczynskii Charitonov, 1946 – Central Asia
- Mesiotelus libanicus (Simon, 1878) – Lebanon
- Mesiotelus lubricus (Simon, 1880) – China
- Mesiotelus maderianus Kulczyński, 1899 – Madeira
- Mesiotelus mauritanicus Simon, 1909 – Mediterranean
- Mesiotelus patricki Zamani & Marusik, 2021 – Iran
- Mesiotelus pococki Caporiacco, 1949 – Kenya
- Mesiotelus scopensis Drensky, 1935 – North Macedonia, Bulgaria, Greece, Turkey, Iran
- Mesiotelus tenellus (Thorell, 1875) – Italy
- Mesiotelus tenuissimus (L. Koch, 1866) – Europe, North Africa, Turkmenistan
- Mesiotelus viridis (L. Koch, 1867) – Greece (incl. Crete)
- Mesiotelus zonsteini Mikhailov, 1986 – Central Asia
