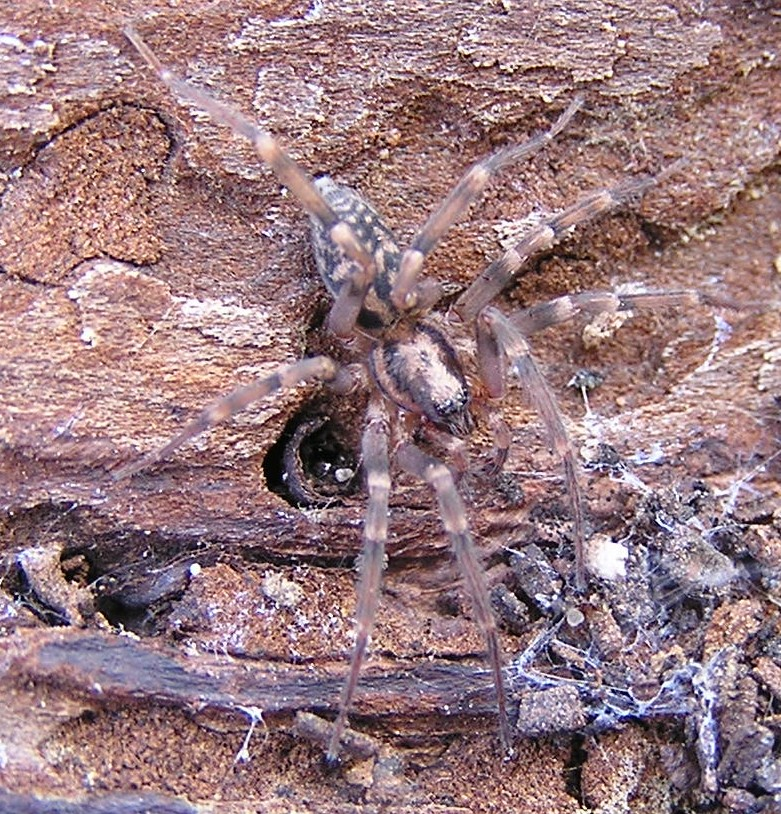
- Liocranum rupicola in a mixed forest in Hambach, Germany

Scientific classification
- Kingdom: Animalia
- Phylum: Arthropoda
- Subphylum: Chelicerata
- Class: Arachnida
- Order: Araneae
- Infraorder: Araneomorphae
- Family: Liocranidae
- Genus: Liocranum; L. Koch, 1866

Type species
- Liocranum rupicola Walckenaer, 1830

Species
- See text.

Diversity
- 15 species

= Liocranum =

Genus of spiders

Liocranum is a genus of spiders in the family Liocranidae. The genus was first described by Ludwig Carl Christian Koch in 1866.

== Species ==
According to The World Spider Catalog, Version 12.5:

- Liocranum apertum Denis, 1960 — France
- Liocranum concolor Simon, 1878 — Corsica
- Liocranum erythrinum Pavesi, 1883 — Ethiopia
- Liocranum freibergi Charitonov, 1946 — Uzbekistan
- Liocranum giersbergi Kraus, 1955 — Sardinia
- Liocranum kochi Herman, 1879 — Hungary
- Liocranum majus Simon, 1878 — Spain
- Liocranum nigritarse L. Koch, 1875 — Ethiopia
- Liocranum ochraceum L. Koch, 1867 — Corfu
- Liocranum perarmatum Kulczyński, 1897 — Slovenia, Croatia
- Liocranum pulchrum Thorell, 1881 — New Guinea
- Liocranum remotum Bryant, 1940 — Cuba
- Liocranum rupicola Walckenaer, 1830 — Europe, Russia
- Liocranum segmentatum Simon, 1878 — France
- Liocranum variabilis Wunderlich, 2008 — Mallorca
