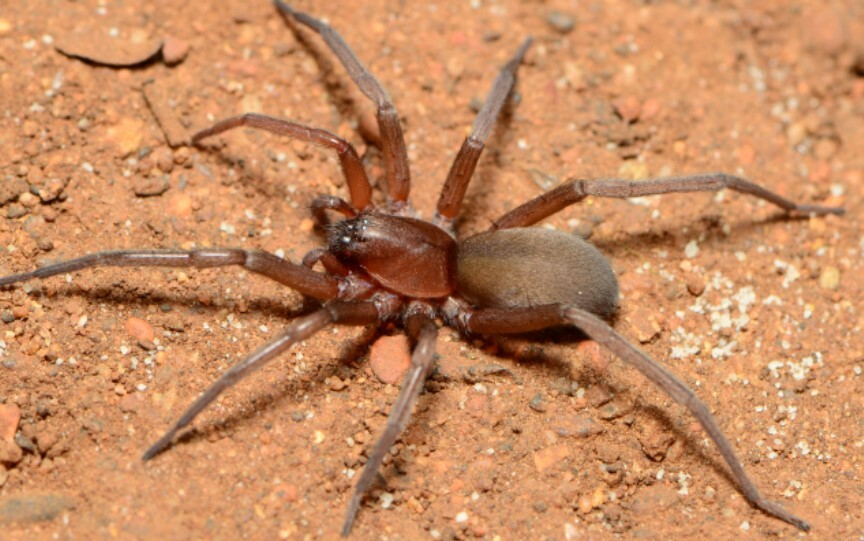
- Rhaeboctesis transvaalensis from South Africa
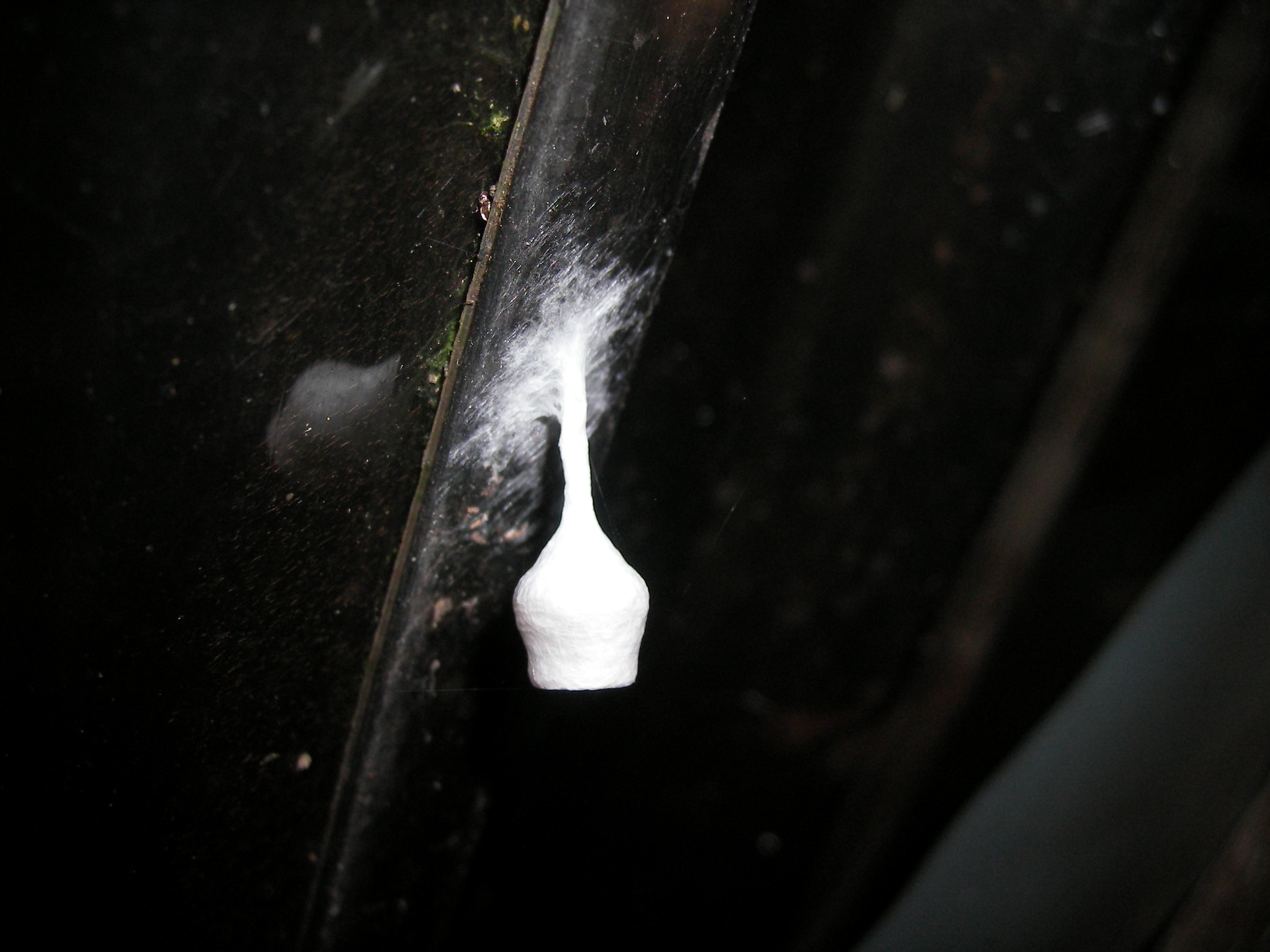
- Egg sac of Agroeca brunnea

Scientific classification
- Kingdom: Animalia
- Phylum: Arthropoda
- Subphylum: Chelicerata
- Class: Arachnida
- Order: Araneae
- Infraorder: Araneomorphae
- Family: Liocranidae; Simon, 1897

Diversity
- 34 genera, 357 species
- blue: reported countries (WSC) green: observation hotspots (iNaturalist)

= Liocranidae =

Sac spiders Temporal range: Palaeogene–present

Family of spiders

Liocranidae is a family of araneomorph spiders first described by Eugène Simon in 1897. They are one of several groups called "sac spiders".

The holarctic genus Agroeca is the best-known, but it also includes various genera of more obscure spiders that still lack a diagnosis.

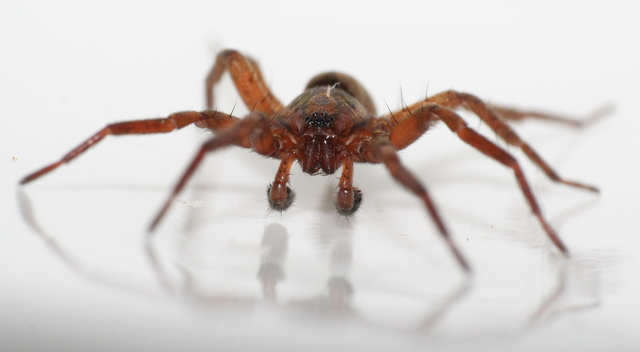
Agroeca brunnea

Two species in the North American genus Neoanagraphis are found in the extremely dry conditions in the Mojave, Sonoran and Chihuahuan deserts.

Females live in animal burrows while males wander and are the ones most often caught in pitfall traps.

== Genera ==
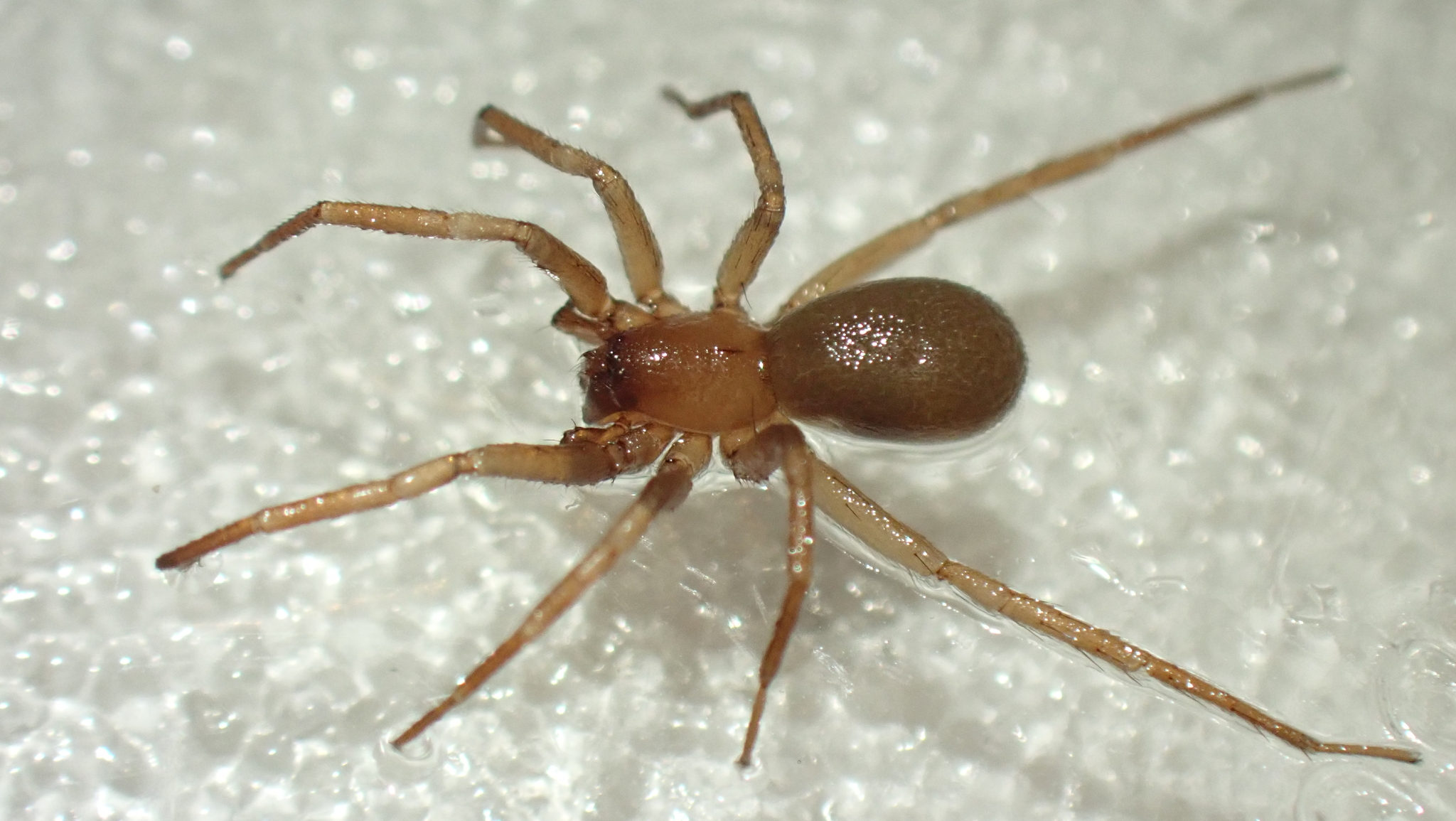
Cybaeodes madidus

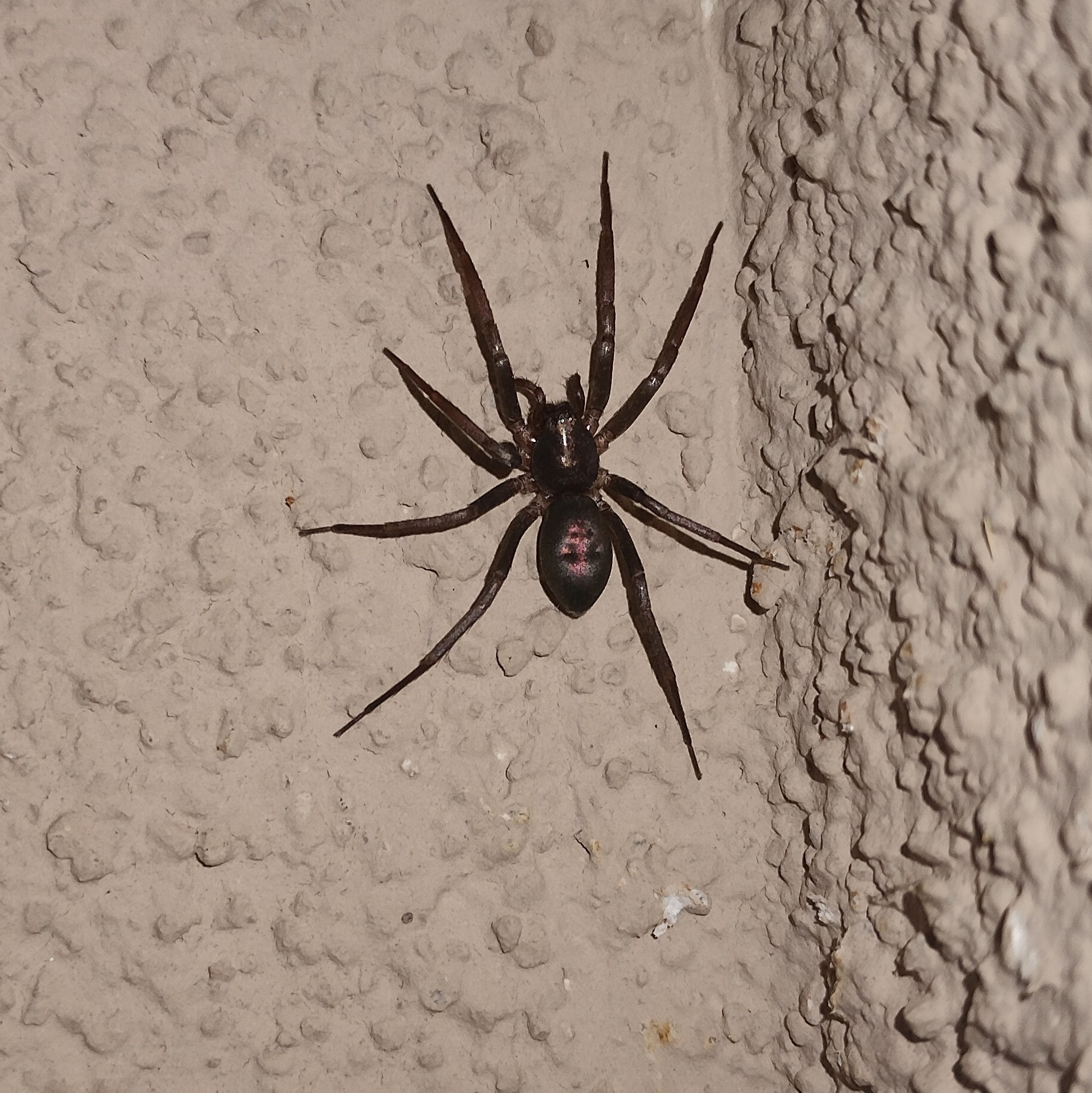
Drapena rutilans

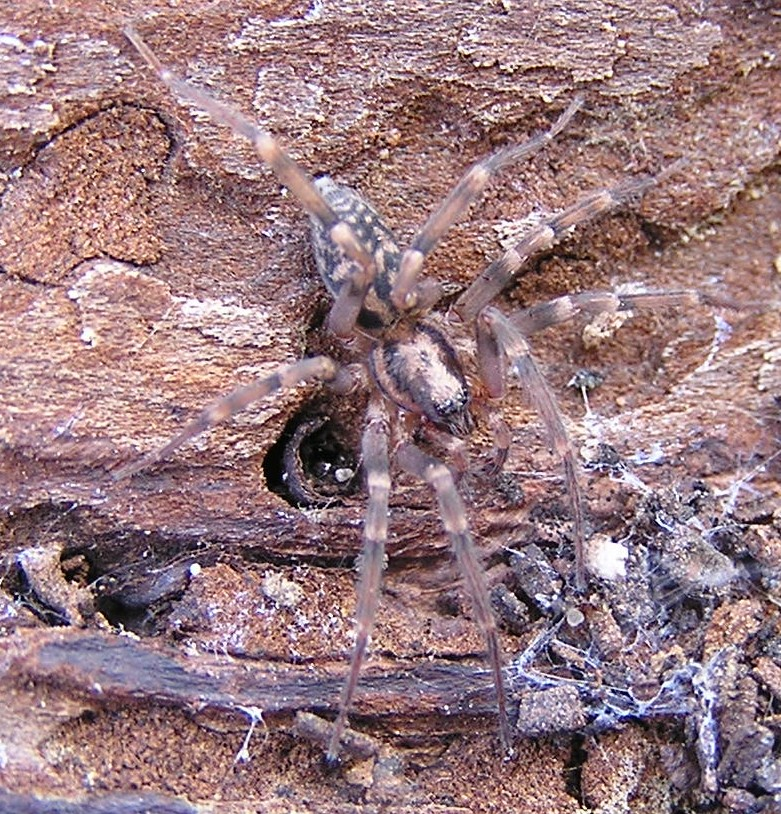
Liocranum rupicola

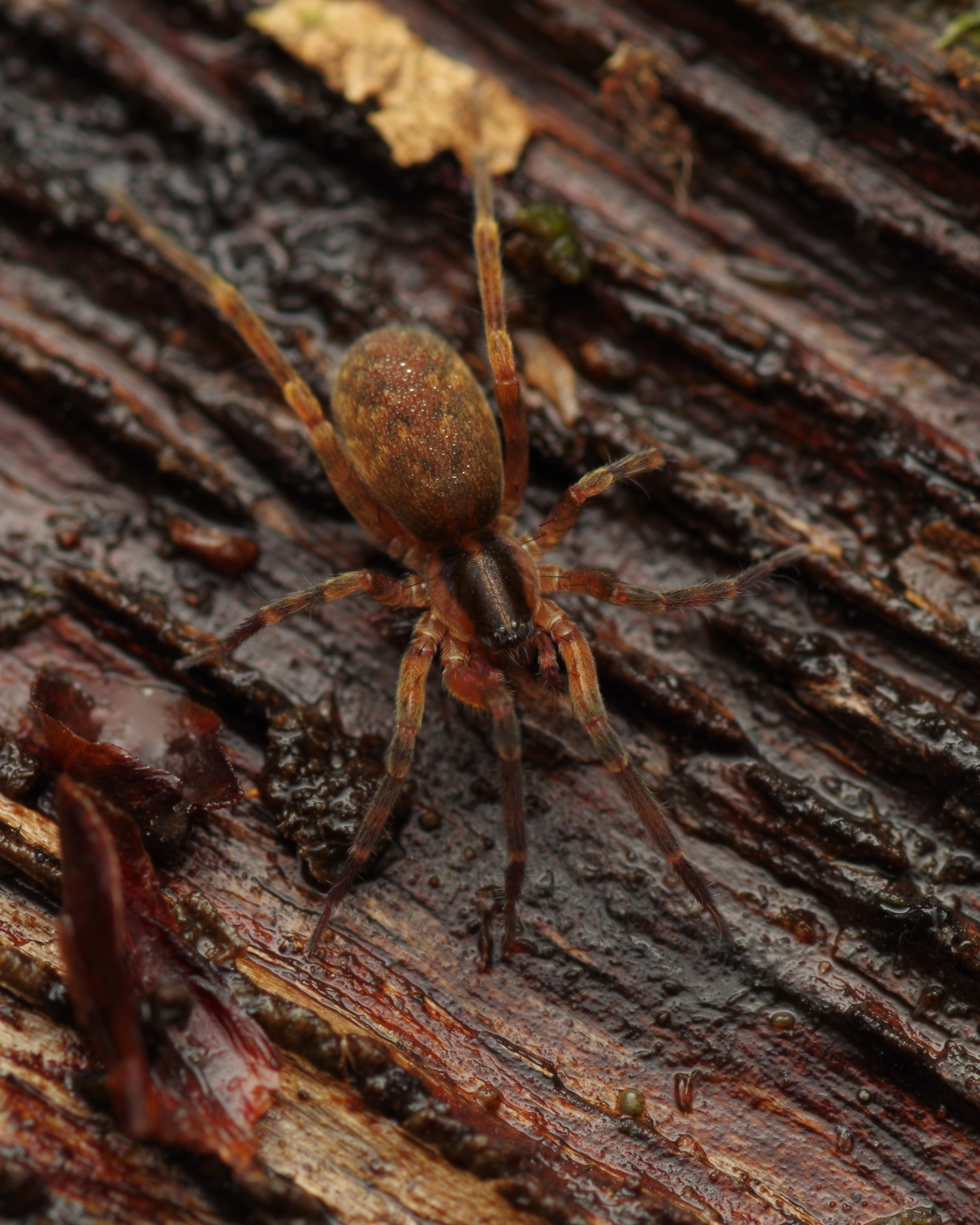
Scotina celans

As of January 2026, this family includes 35 genera and 357 species:

- Agraecina Simon, 1932 – North Africa, Southern Europe to Kazakhstan
- Agroeca Westring, 1861 – North Africa, Asia, Russia, Southern Europe, North America, Colombia, Peru
- Andromma Simon, 1893 – Africa
- Apostenus Westring, 1851 – Algeria, Morocco, Pakistan, Georgia?, Southern Europe, North America
- Arabelia Bosselaers, 2009 – China, Turkey, Cyprus, Greece
- Argistes Simon, 1897 – Sri Lanka
- Cteniogaster Bosselaers & Jocqué, 2013 – Kenya, Tanzania
- Cybaeodes Simon, 1878 – Algeria, Tunisia, Italy, Spain, France
- Drapeta Menge, 1875 – Caucasus, France
- Drassinella Banks, 1904 – Mexico, United States
- Hesperocranum Ubick & Platnick, 1991 – United States
- Jacaena Thorell, 1897 – China, Laos, Myanmar, Thailand
- Koppe Deeleman-Reinhold, 2001 – Indonesia, Malaysia, Philippines, India, Sri Lanka, New Guinea
- Laudetia Gertsch, 1941 – Dominica, Puerto Rico
- Liocranoeca Wunderlich, 1999 – Iraq, Bulgaria, Ukraine, Russia, Albania, Spain, United States
- Liocranum L. Koch, 1866 – Ethiopia, Morocco, Uzbekistan, Europe, Cuba, New Guinea
- Liparochrysis Simon, 1909 – Australia
- Mesiotelus Simon, 1897 – Kenya, North Africa, Asia, Europe
- Mesobria Simon, 1898 – St. Vincent
- Neoanagraphis Gertsch & Mulaik, 1936 – Mexico, United States
- Oedignatha Thorell, 1881 – Asia, Vanuatu, Samoa, Borneo. Introduced to Madagascar, Réunion, Seychelles, Japan, Samoa
- Paratus Simon, 1898 – Asia
- Platnick Marusik & Fomichev, 2020 – Tajikistan, China
- Rhaeboctesis Simon, 1897 – Angola, Southern Africa, China
- Scotina Menge, 1873 – Algeria, Morocco, Korea, Turkey, Portugal
- Sesieutes Simon, 1897 – China, Southeast Asia, Borneo
- Sestakovaia Zamani & Marusik, 2021 – Iran, Turkey, Eastern Europe
- Sinocranum Chu & Li, 2023 – China
- Sphingius Thorell, 1890 – Asia
- Sudharmia Deeleman-Reinhold, 2001 – Indonesia
- Teutamus Thorell, 1890 – Southeast Asia
- Toxoniella Warui & Jocqué, 2002 – Kenya
- Turkocranum Danışman & Coşar, 2022 – Turkey
- Vankeeria Bosselaers, 2012 – Greece
- Xenoplectus Schiapelli & Gerschman, 1958 – Argentina
