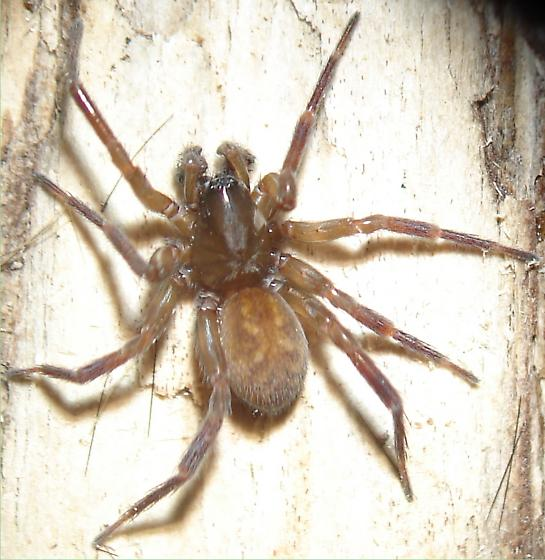
- Cybaeopsis wabritaska

Scientific classification
- Kingdom: Animalia
- Phylum: Arthropoda
- Subphylum: Chelicerata
- Class: Arachnida
- Order: Araneae
- Infraorder: Araneomorphae
- Family: Amaurobiidae
- Genus: Cybaeopsis; Strand, 1907

Type species
- C. typica Strand, 1907

Species
- 12, see text

Synonyms
- Callioplus Bishop & Crosby, 1935

= Cybaeopsis =

Genus of spiders

Cybaeopsis is a genus of tangled nest spiders first described by Embrik Strand in 1907, and transferred from Agelenidae to Amaurobiidae by Pekka T. Lehtinen in 1967. They all occur in North America except for three species; C. lodovicii, C. theoblicki and C. typica.

Members of this genus closely resemble those of the genus Callobius, especially the females. It is considered a senior synonym of Callioplus, but not of Alauximus, which is a synonym of Tugana.

== Species ==
The former C. crassa and C. infumata have both been moved to the Cuban genus, Tugana, and several species have synonyms with the name "Amaurobius", such as C. armipotens and C tibialis.

As of October 2026 this genus contains twelve species:

- Cybaeopsis armipotens (Bishop & Crosby, 1926) – USA
- Cybaeopsis euopla (Bishop & Crosby, 1935) – USA, Canada
- Cybaeopsis hoplites (Bishop & Crosby, 1926) – USA
- Cybaeopsis hoplomachus (Bishop & Crosby, 1926) – USA
- Cybaeopsis lodovicii Ballarin & Pantini, 2022 – Italy
- Cybaeopsis macaria (Chamberlin, 1947) – USA
- Cybaeopsis pantopla (Bishop & Crosby, 1935) – USA
- Cybaeopsis spenceri (Leech, 1972) – USA
- Cybaeopsis theoblicki (Bosmans, 2021) – Portugal
- Cybaeopsis tibialis (Emerton, 1888) – USA, Canada
- Cybaeopsis typica Strand, 1907 – Russia (Sakhalin, Kurile Is.), Japan
- Cybaeopsis wabritaska (Leech, 1972) – USA, Canada
