= Agelenoidea =

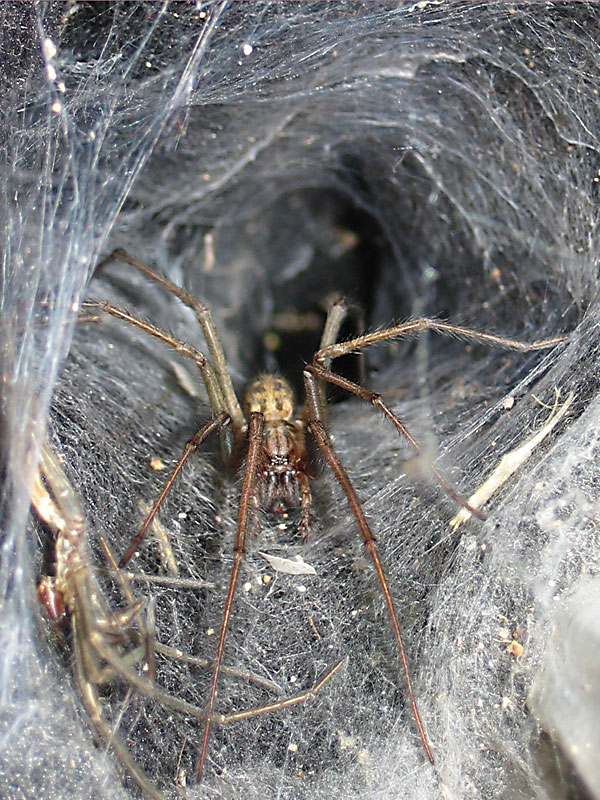
Tegenaria duellica, Agelenidae

The Agelenoidea or agelenoids are a superfamily or informal group of entelegyne araneomorph spiders. Phylogenetic studies since 2000 have not consistently recovered such a group, with more recent studies rejecting it.

== Phylogeny ==
In 1999, a phylogenetic study found a clade called "agelenoids" consisting of members of the families Agelenidae, Amphinectidae (now included in Desidae) and Desidae. A 2005 study did not confirm this grouping, instead placing these three families plus Dictynidae in a clade called the "fused cribellar clade". The Desidae have also been placed in the Dictynoidea. In 2014, a cladogram produced in a study of dionychan spiders placed members of the families Amaurobiidae and Cycloctenidae in a clade with members of Agelenidae, Amphinectidae (now Desidae) and Desidae, as sister to the rest of the large RTA Clade. (Amaurobiidae, represented by the genera Pimus and Macrobunus, was not monophyletic in this study.) Shading marks families once considered agelenoids.

- RTA clade
  - - - Amaurobiidae (Pimus)
      - - Stiphidiidae (Stiphidion)
        - - Agelenidae (Neoramia)
          - - - Amaurobiidae (Macrobunus)
              - Cycloctenidae (Toxopsiella, Cycloctenus)
            - Desidae (Badumna, Calacadia, Metaltella)
  - "Oval Calamistrum Clade"

A 2017 study also did not support the Agelenoidea, but placed the two families previously included in this group in a more widely defined "marronoid clade", comprising Amaurobiidae, Agelenidae, Cybaeidae, Cycloctenidae, Desidae, Dictynidae, Hahniidae, Stiphidiidae and Toxopidae, with Agelenidae and Desidae quite far apart.
