= Taira cangshan =

Scientific classification
- Kingdom: Animalia
- Phylum: Arthropoda
- Subphylum: Chelicerata
- Class: Arachnida
- Order: Araneae
- Infraorder: Araneomorphae
- Family: Amaurobiidae
- Genus: Taira
- Species: T. cangshan

Binomial name
- Taira cangshan Zhang, Zhu & Song, 2008

Species of spider

Taira cangshan is a species of spider in the family Amaurobiidae. It was first described in 2008 by Zhang, Zhu and Da-xiang Song. It is native to China.
