= Otira satura =

Conservation status
- Not Threatened (NZ TCS)

Scientific classification
- Kingdom: Animalia
- Phylum: Arthropoda
- Subphylum: Chelicerata
- Class: Arachnida
- Order: Araneae
- Infraorder: Araneomorphae
- Family: Amaurobiidae
- Genus: Otira
- Species: O. satura

Binomial name
- Otira satura Forster & Wilton, 1973

Species of spider

Otira satura is a species of Amaurobiidae spider that is endemic to New Zealand.

== Taxonomy ==
This species was described in 1973 by Ray Forster and Cecil Wilton from female and male specimens. The holotype is stored in Otago Museum.

== Description ==
The male is recorded at 3.28mm in length whereas the female is 3.47mm. The male carapace is coloured pale orange brown. The legs are yellow. The abdomen is pale yellow brown with black markings.

== Distribution ==
This species is only known from Westland, New Zealand.

== Conservation status ==
Under the New Zealand Threat Classification System, this species is listed as "Not Threatened".
