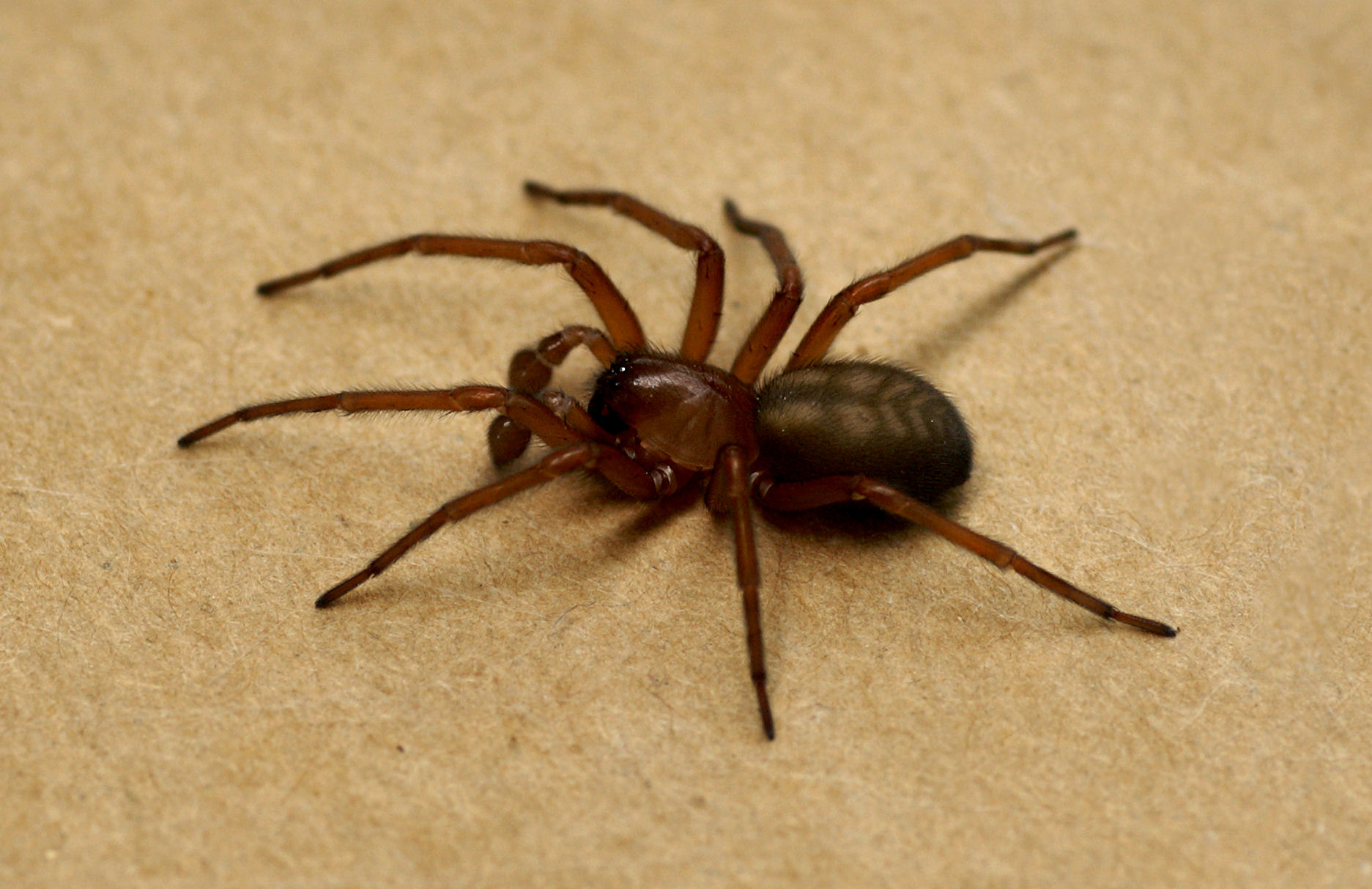
- Male: note the enlarged palps
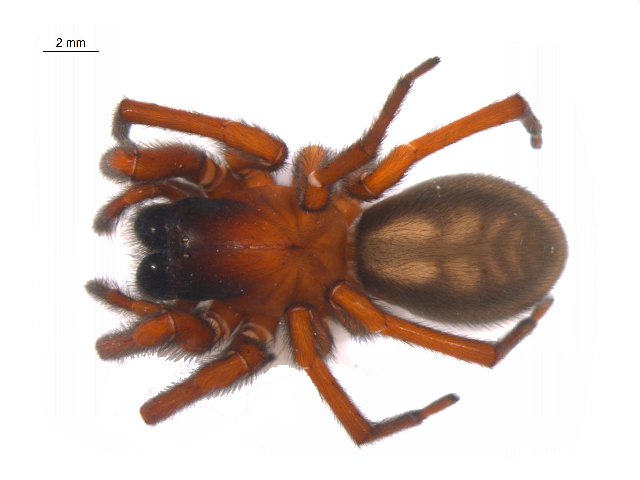
- Female

Conservation status
- Secure (NatureServe)

Scientific classification
- Kingdom: Animalia
- Phylum: Arthropoda
- Subphylum: Chelicerata
- Class: Arachnida
- Order: Araneae
- Infraorder: Araneomorphae
- Family: Amaurobiidae
- Genus: Callobius
- Species: C. severus

Binomial name
- Callobius severus (Simon, 1884)

= Callobius severus =

Species of spider

Callobius severus, commonly known as the Pacific hacklemesh weaver or west coast lace weaver, is a species of spider found in parts of the United States and Canada. Individuals reach roughly 19 mm (3/4 in) in size, with males typically appearing smaller than females. The cephalothorax and legs are reddish to dark brown and the abdomen is dark to light grey with fine hairs, often appearing with large, bilaterally mirrored paler spots. Males feature large, extended palps with prominent projections.

It is a nesting woodland species commonly seen in the Pacific Northwest, and one of the most commonly found and widespread spiders in populated areas of Washington state. It can often be found in households and other man-made structures with thin funnel webs, so long as the niche has not yet been filled by another organism. The species poses no threat to humans or pets, though like other Callobius species, the bite is painful.
