= Taira flavidorsalis =

Scientific classification
- Domain: Eukaryota
- Kingdom: Animalia
- Phylum: Arthropoda
- Subphylum: Chelicerata
- Class: Arachnida
- Order: Araneae
- Infraorder: Araneomorphae
- Family: Amaurobiidae
- Genus: Taira
- Species: T. flavidorsalis

Binomial name
- Taira flavidorsalis (Yaginuma, 1964)

Synonyms
- Amaurobius flavidorsalis Yaginuma, 1964

Species of spider

Taira flavidorsalis is a spider species in the genus Taira. It is native to Japan. It was first described in 1964 as Amaurobius flavidorsalis.
