= Otira liana =

Conservation status
- Data Deficit (NZ TCS)

Scientific classification
- Kingdom: Animalia
- Phylum: Arthropoda
- Subphylum: Chelicerata
- Class: Arachnida
- Order: Araneae
- Infraorder: Araneomorphae
- Family: Amaurobiidae
- Genus: Otira
- Species: O. liana

Binomial name
- Otira liana Forster & Wilton, 1973

Species of spider

Otira liana is a species of Amaurobiidae spider that is endemic to New Zealand.

== Taxonomy ==
This species was described in 1973 by Ray Forster and Cecil Wilton from female. The holotype is stored in Otago Museum.

== Description ==
The female is recorded at 3.44mm in length. The carapace is coloured pale yellow brown with greyish shading. The legs are pale yellow brown. The abdomen is creamy with black shading.

== Distribution ==
This species is only known from Nelson and Westland in New Zealand.

== Conservation status ==
Under the New Zealand Threat Classification System, this species is listed as "Data Deficient" with the qualifiers of "Data Poor: Size" and "Data Poor: Trend".
