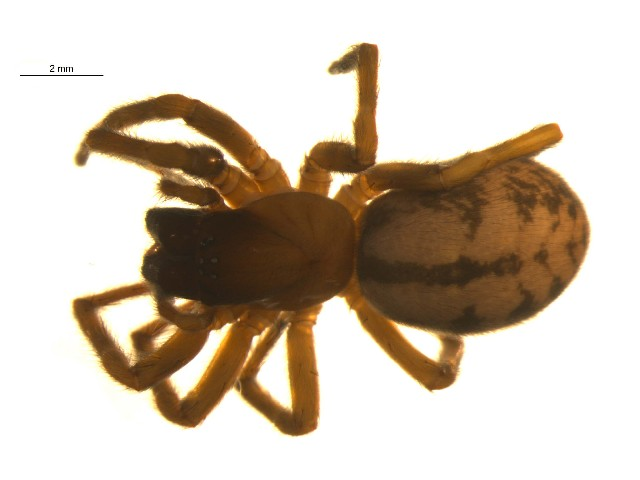
- Callobius nomeus female specimen

Conservation status
- Secure (NatureServe)

Scientific classification
- Kingdom: Animalia
- Phylum: Arthropoda
- Subphylum: Chelicerata
- Class: Arachnida
- Order: Araneae
- Infraorder: Araneomorphae
- Family: Amaurobiidae
- Genus: Callobius
- Species: C. nomeus

Binomial name
- Callobius nomeus (Chamberlin, 1919)

= Callobius nomeus =

Species of spider

Callobius nomeus is a species of hacklemesh weaver in the spider family Amaurobiidae. It is found in the United States and Canada. This species is associated with tree bark.
