= Muritaia orientalis =

Conservation status
- Data Deficit (NZ TCS)

Scientific classification
- Kingdom: Animalia
- Phylum: Arthropoda
- Subphylum: Chelicerata
- Class: Arachnida
- Order: Araneae
- Infraorder: Araneomorphae
- Family: Amaurobiidae
- Genus: Muritaia
- Species: M. orientalis

Binomial name
- Muritaia orientalis Forster & Wilton, 1973

Species of spider

Muritaia orientalis is a species of Amaurobiidae spider that is endemic to New Zealand.

== Taxonomy ==
This species was described in 1973 by Ray Forster and Cecil Wilton from a female specimen. The holotype is stored in Otago Museum.

== Description ==
The female is recorded at 3.60mm in length. The carapace is coloured pale yellowish brown with dark shading. The legs are banded. The abdomen has olive grey shading with pale markings.

== Distribution ==
This species is only known from Hawkes Bay, New Zealand.

== Conservation status ==
Under the New Zealand Threat Classification System, this species is listed as "Data Deficient" with the qualifiers of "Data Poor: Size", "Data Poor: Trend" and "One Location".
