= Pimus fractus =

Scientific classification
- Kingdom: Animalia
- Phylum: Arthropoda
- Subphylum: Chelicerata
- Class: Arachnida
- Order: Araneae
- Infraorder: Araneomorphae
- Family: Amaurobiidae
- Genus: Pimus
- Species: P. fractus

Binomial name
- Pimus fractus (Chamberlin, 1920)

Species of spider

Pimus fractus is a species of hacklemesh weaver in the spider family Amaurobiidae. It is found in the United States.
