= Brazilian ship Timbira =

Timbira or Tymbira is the name of the following ships of the Brazilian Navy, named for the Timbira peoples:

- Brazilian cruiser Tymbira, a torpedo cruiser launched in 1896 and decommissioned in 1917
- Brazilian submarine Tymbira (1937) (S12), an Adua-class submarine acquired from Italy as a Tupy or T-class submarine; operated in World War II.
- Brazilian submarine Timbira (S32), a Tupi-class submarine launched in 1996 and decommissioned in 2023

== See also ==
- Tymbira, a genus of spiders
