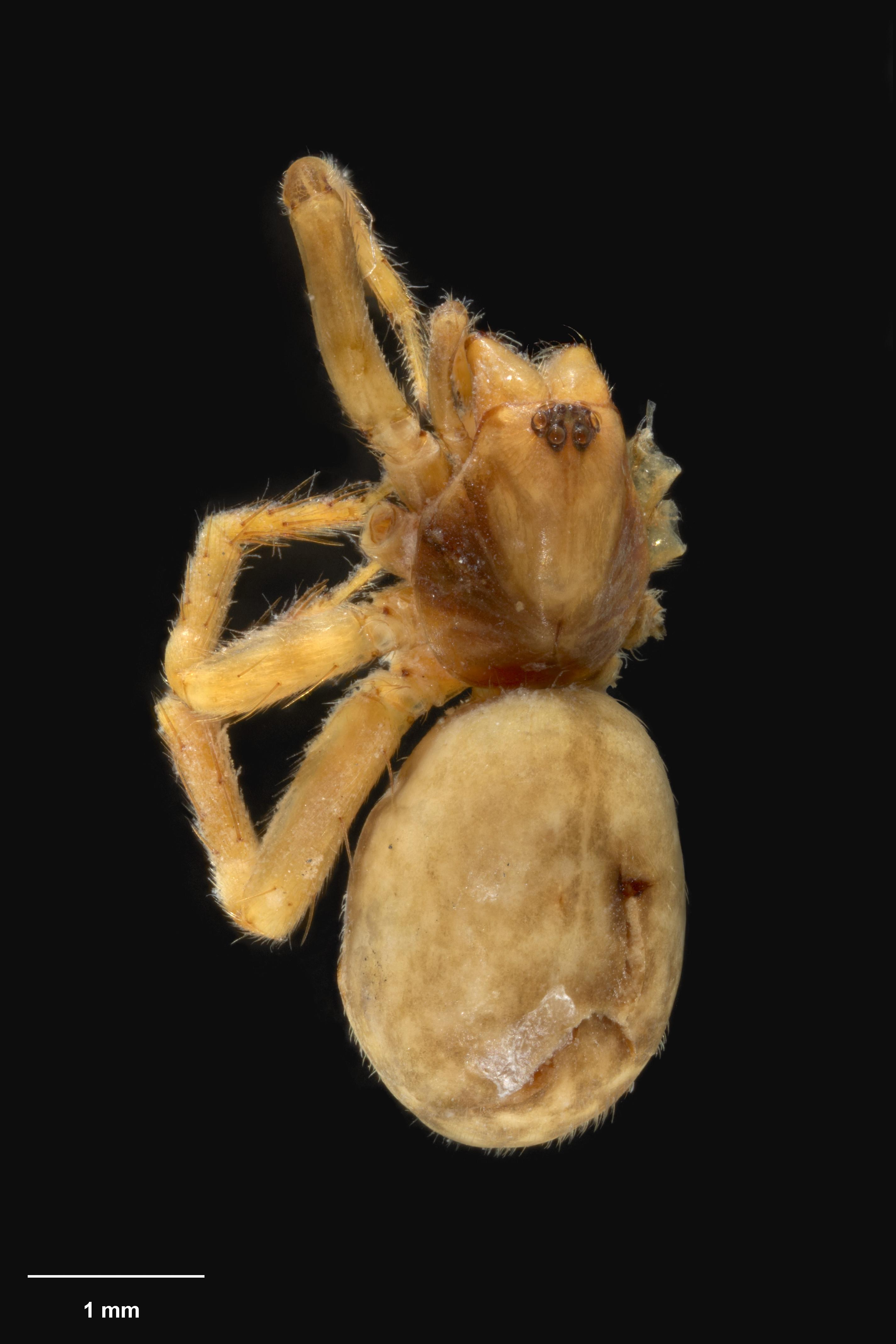

Conservation status
- Naturally Uncommon (NZ TCS)

Scientific classification
- Kingdom: Animalia
- Phylum: Arthropoda
- Subphylum: Chelicerata
- Class: Arachnida
- Order: Araneae
- Infraorder: Araneomorphae
- Family: Amaurobiidae
- Genus: Otira
- Species: O. indura

Binomial name
- Otira indura Forster & Wilton, 1973

= Otira indura =

Species of spider

Otira indura is a species of Amaurobiidae spider that is endemic to New Zealand.

== Taxonomy ==
This species was described in 1973 by Ray Forster and Cecil Wilton from female and male specimens. The holotype is stored in Te Papa Museum under registration number AS.000051.

== Description ==
The female is recorded at 4.72mm in length. The cephalothorax is coloured orange brown and is yellow brown in the head region. The legs are orange brown. The abdomen has greyish black reticulated markings. The male is identical.

== Distribution ==
This species is only known from Wellington, New Zealand.

== Conservation status ==
Under the New Zealand Threat Classification System, this species is listed as "Naturally Uncommon" with the qualifier of "Range Restricted".
