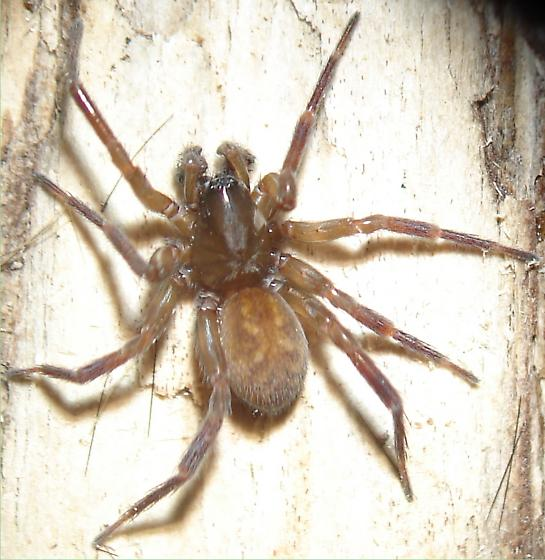
- Cybaeopsis wabritaska

Conservation status
- Secure (NatureServe)

Scientific classification
- Kingdom: Animalia
- Phylum: Arthropoda
- Subphylum: Chelicerata
- Class: Arachnida
- Order: Araneae
- Infraorder: Araneomorphae
- Family: Amaurobiidae
- Genus: Cybaeopsis
- Species: C. wabritaska

Binomial name
- Cybaeopsis wabritaska (Leech, 1972)

= Cybaeopsis wabritaska =

Species of spider

Cybaeopsis wabritaska is a species of hacklemesh weaver in the spider family Amaurobiidae. It is found in the United States and Canada.
