= Muritaia kaituna =

Conservation status
- Data Deficit (NZ TCS)

Scientific classification
- Kingdom: Animalia
- Phylum: Arthropoda
- Subphylum: Chelicerata
- Class: Arachnida
- Order: Araneae
- Infraorder: Araneomorphae
- Family: Amaurobiidae
- Genus: Muritaia
- Species: M. kaituna

Binomial name
- Muritaia kaituna Forster & Wilton, 1973

Species of spider

Muritaia kaituna is a species of Amaurobiidae spider that is endemic to New Zealand.

== Taxonomy ==
This species was described in 1973 by Ray Forster and Cecil Wilton from a female specimen. The holotype is stored in Canterbury Museum.

== Description ==
The female is recorded at 3.60mm in length. The cephalothorax and legs are dark brown. The abdomen is creamy with blackish shading.

== Distribution ==
This species is only known from Banks Peninsula, New Zealand.

== Conservation status ==
Under the New Zealand Threat Classification System, this species is listed as "Data Deficient" with the qualifiers of "Data Poor: Size", "Data Poor: Trend" and "One Location".
