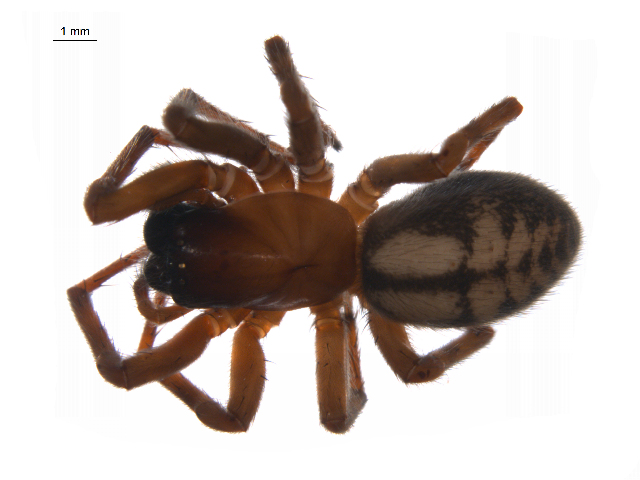

Conservation status
- Secure (NatureServe)

Scientific classification
- Kingdom: Animalia
- Phylum: Arthropoda
- Subphylum: Chelicerata
- Class: Arachnida
- Order: Araneae
- Infraorder: Araneomorphae
- Family: Amaurobiidae
- Genus: Callobius
- Species: C. pictus

Binomial name
- Callobius pictus (Simon, 1884)

= Callobius pictus =

Species of spider

Callobius pictus is a species of hacklemesh weaver in the spider family Amaurobiidae. It is found in the United States and Canada.
