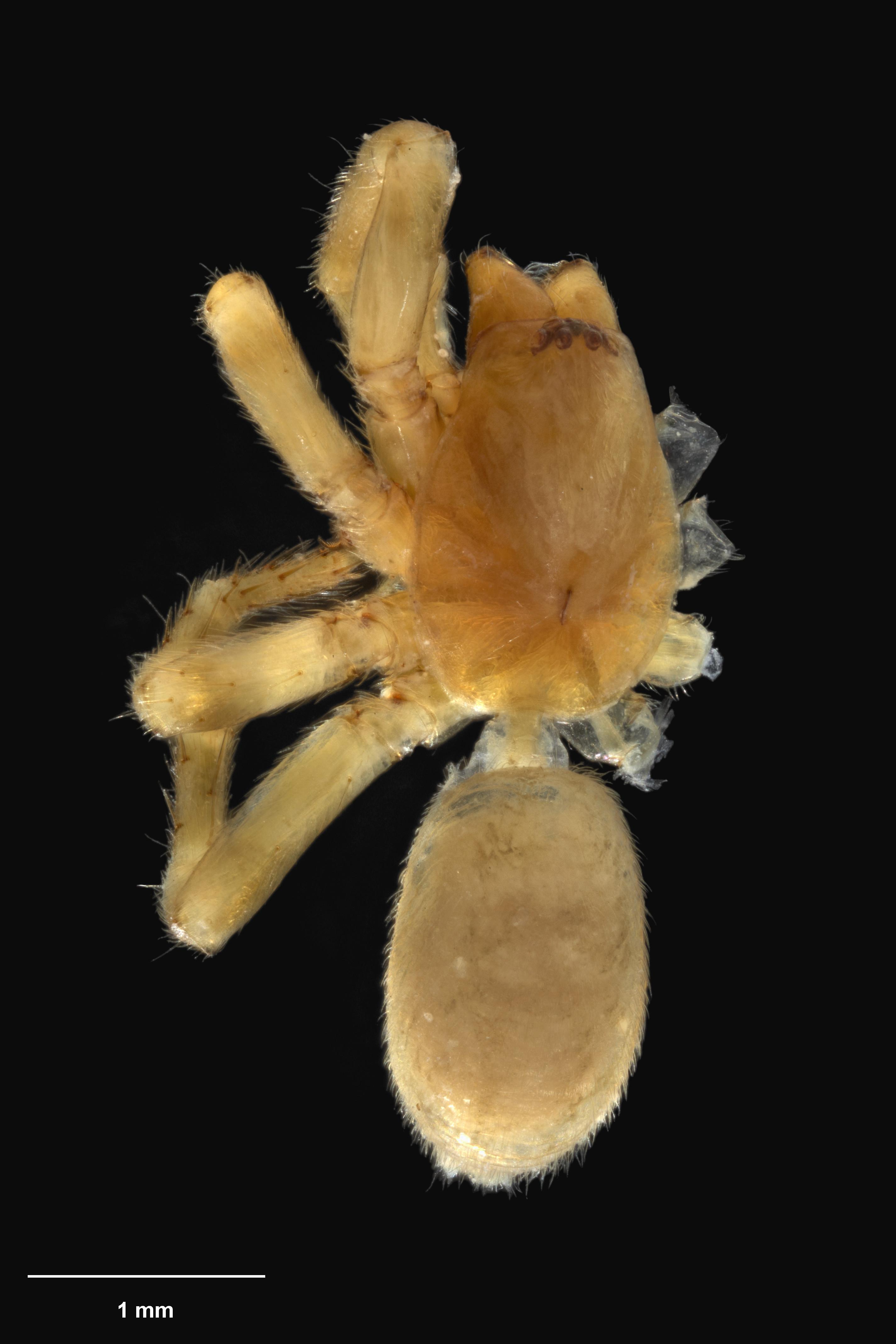

Conservation status
- Not Threatened (NZ TCS)

Scientific classification
- Domain: Eukaryota
- Kingdom: Animalia
- Phylum: Arthropoda
- Subphylum: Chelicerata
- Class: Arachnida
- Order: Araneae
- Suborder: Opisthothelae
- Infraorder: Araneomorphae
- Family: Amaurobiidae
- Genus: Muritaia
- Species: M. suba

Binomial name
- Muritaia suba Forster & Wilton, 1973

= Muritaia suba =

Species of arachnid

Muritaia suba is a species of Amaurobiidae, endemic to New Zealand.

== Taxonomy ==
This species was described in 1973 by Ray Forster and Cecil Wilton from female and male specimens. The holotype is stored in Te Papa Museum under registration number AS.000114.

== Description ==
The female is recorded at 3.44mm in length. The cephalothorax and legs are coloured pale reddish brown, while the abdomen is pale yellow brown and has irregular black shading down the dorsal surface. The male is identical.

== Distribution ==
This species is only known from Wellington, New Zealand.

== Conservation status ==
Under the New Zealand Threat Classification System, this species is listed as "Not Threatened".
