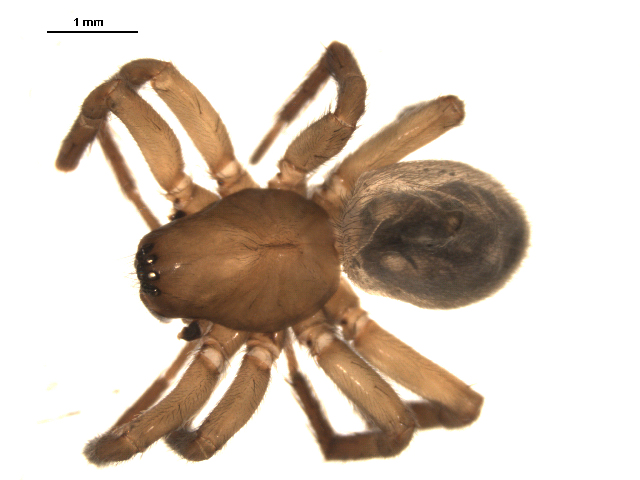
- C. euopla, male
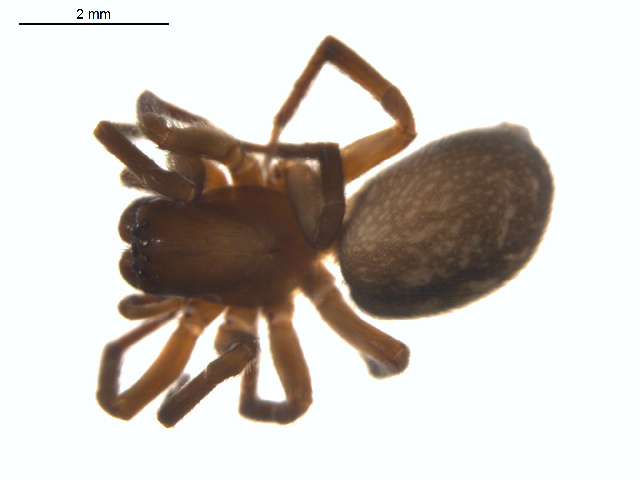
- C. euopla, female

Conservation status
- Secure (NatureServe)

Scientific classification
- Kingdom: Animalia
- Phylum: Arthropoda
- Subphylum: Chelicerata
- Class: Arachnida
- Order: Araneae
- Infraorder: Araneomorphae
- Family: Amaurobiidae
- Genus: Cybaeopsis
- Species: C. euopla

Binomial name
- Cybaeopsis euopla (Bishop & Crosby, 1935)

= Cybaeopsis euopla =

Species of spider

Cybaeopsis euopla is a species of hacklemesh weaver in the spider family Amaurobiidae. It is found in the United States and Canada.
