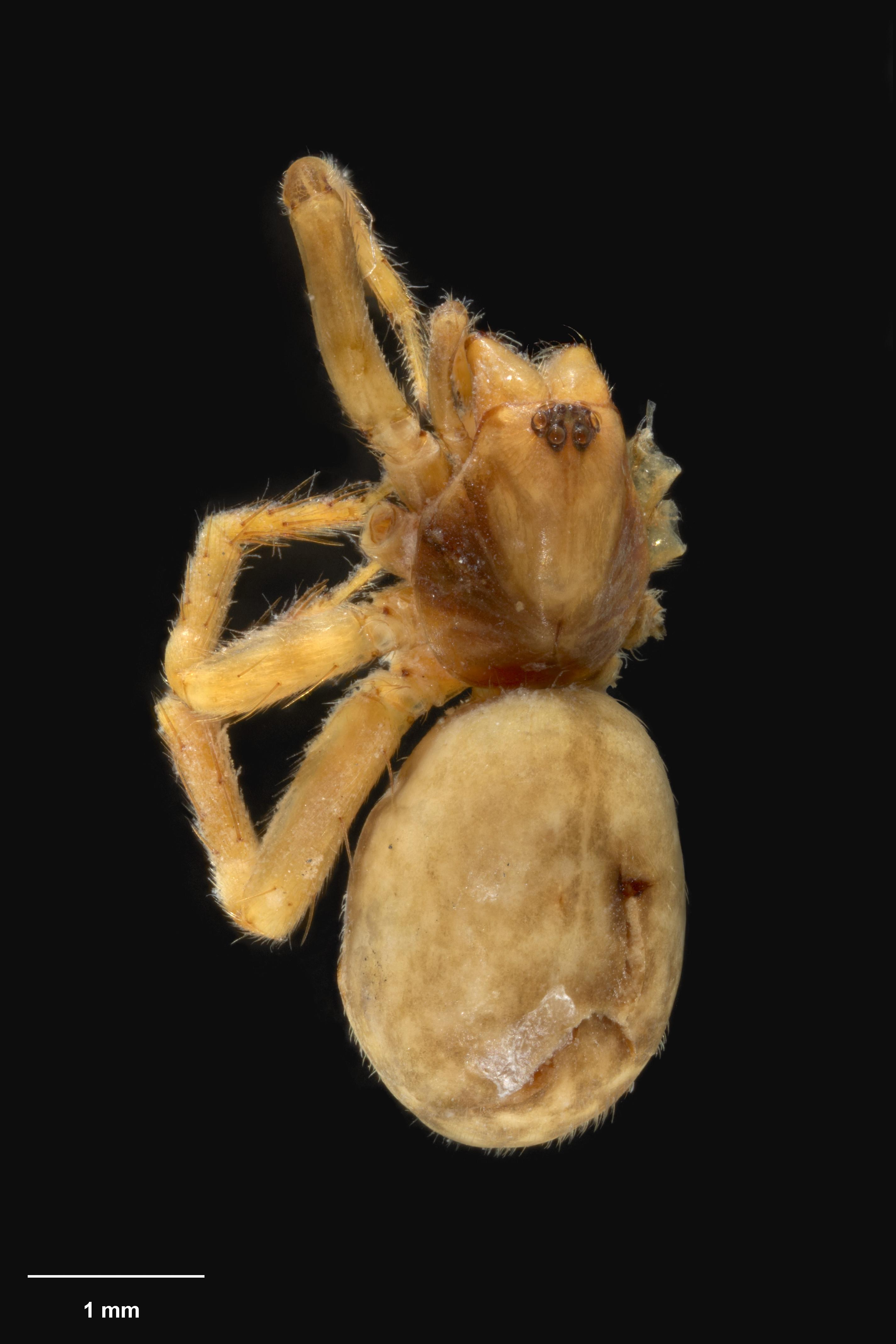

Scientific classification
- Kingdom: Animalia
- Phylum: Arthropoda
- Subphylum: Chelicerata
- Class: Arachnida
- Order: Araneae
- Infraorder: Araneomorphae
- Family: Amaurobiidae
- Genus: Otira; Forster & Wilton, 1973

Type species
- O. satura Forster & Wilton, 1973

Species
- 6, see text

= Otira (spider) =

Genus of spiders

Otira is a genus of South Pacific tangled nest spiders first described by Raymond Robert Forster & C. L. Wilton in 1973. The genus is endemic to New Zealand.

A 2011 review of the genus removed three Australian species (Otira affinis, Otira aquilonaria and Otira summa), and placed them within a new genus, Oztira. This new genus name is a portmanteau formed by combining the genus Otira with Oz, a nickname for Australia.

== Species ==
As of October 2026 it contains six species:

- Otira canasta Forster & Wilton, 1973 — New Zealand
- Otira indura Forster & Wilton, 1973 — New Zealand
- Otira liana Forster & Wilton, 1973 — New Zealand
- Otira parva Forster & Wilton, 1973 — New Zealand
- Otira satura Forster & Wilton, 1973 — New Zealand
- Otira terricola Forster & Wilton, 1973 — New Zealand
