= Otira terricola =

Conservation status
- Data Deficit (NZ TCS)

Scientific classification
- Kingdom: Animalia
- Phylum: Arthropoda
- Subphylum: Chelicerata
- Class: Arachnida
- Order: Araneae
- Infraorder: Araneomorphae
- Family: Amaurobiidae
- Genus: Otira
- Species: O. terricola

Binomial name
- Otira terricola Forster & Wilton, 1973

Species of spider

Otira terricola is a species of Amaurobiidae spider that is endemic to New Zealand.

== Taxonomy ==
This species was described in 1973 by Ray Forster and Cecil Wilton from female and male specimens. The holotype is stored in Otago Museum.

== Description ==
The female is recorded at 3.62mm in length. The male is identical.

== Distribution ==
This species is only known from Westland, New Zealand.

== Conservation status ==
Under the New Zealand Threat Classification System, this species is listed as "Data Deficient" with the qualifiers of "Data Poor: Size" and "Data Poor: Trend".
