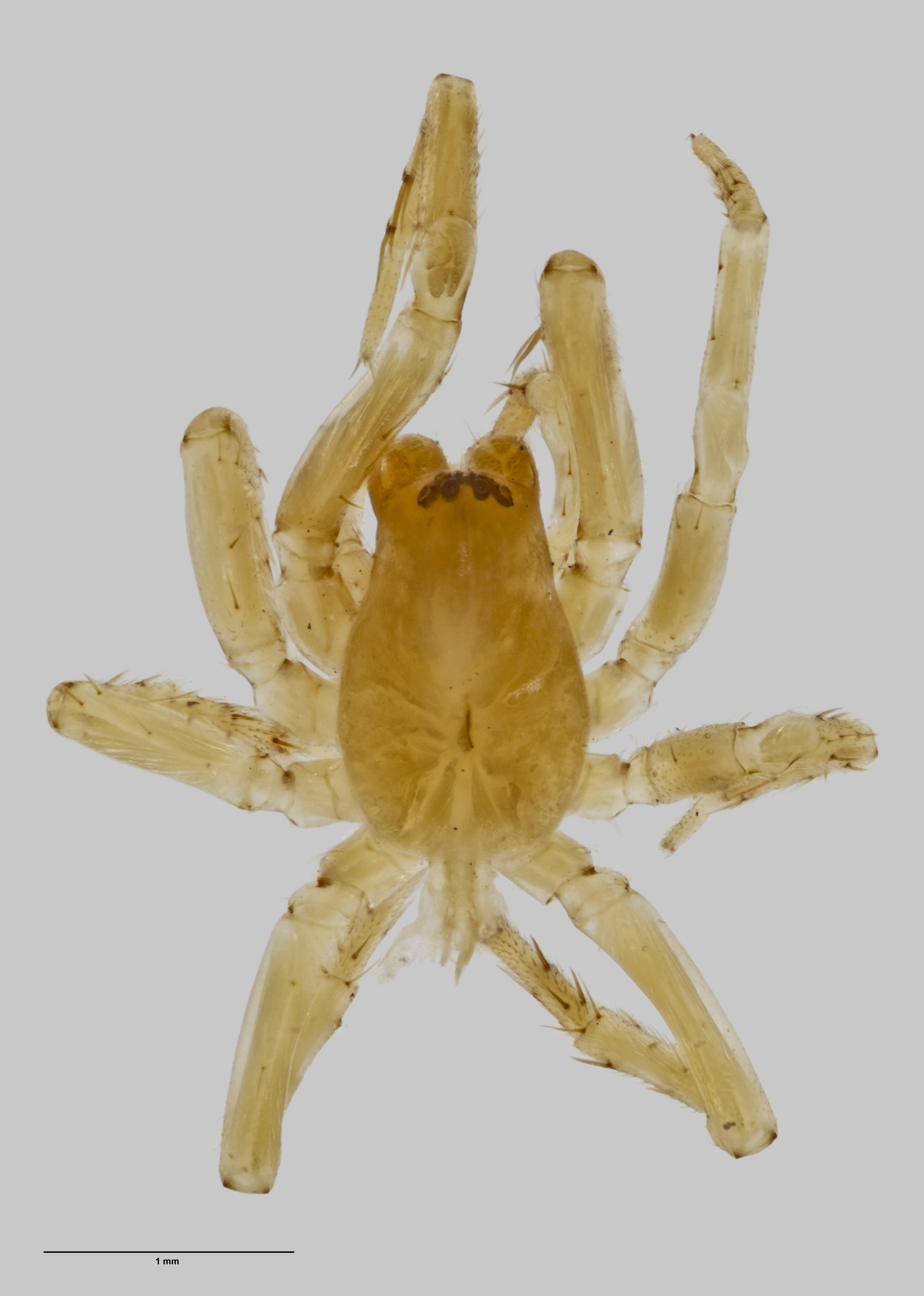
- Muritaia longispinata

Scientific classification
- Kingdom: Animalia
- Phylum: Arthropoda
- Subphylum: Chelicerata
- Class: Arachnida
- Order: Araneae
- Infraorder: Araneomorphae
- Family: Amaurobiidae
- Genus: Muritaia; Forster & Wilton, 1973

Type species
- M. suba Forster & Wilton, 1973

Species
- 5, see text

= Muritaia =

Genus of spiders

Muritaia is a genus of South Pacific tangled nest spiders first described by Raymond Robert Forster & C. L. Wilton in 1973.

== Species ==
As of October 2026 it contains five species, all found in New Zealand:

- Muritaia kaituna Forster & Wilton, 1973 – New Zealand
- Muritaia longispinata Forster & Wilton, 1973 – New Zealand
- Muritaia orientalis Forster & Wilton, 1973 – New Zealand
- Muritaia parabusa Forster & Wilton, 1973 – New Zealand
- Muritaia suba Forster & Wilton, 1973 – New Zealand
