= Rhoicinaria =

Scientific classification
- Kingdom: Animalia
- Phylum: Arthropoda
- Subphylum: Chelicerata
- Class: Arachnida
- Order: Araneae
- Infraorder: Araneomorphae
- Family: Amaurobiidae
- Genus: Rhoicinaria; Exline, 1950

Type species
- R. rorerae Exline, 1950

Species
- R. maculata (Keyserling, 1878) – Colombia; R. rorerae Exline, 1950 – Ecuador

Genus of spiders

Rhoicinaria is a genus of South American tangled nest spiders first described by H. Exline in 1950. As of October 2026 it contains only two species.
