= Neuquenia =

Scientific classification
- Domain: Eukaryota
- Kingdom: Animalia
- Phylum: Arthropoda
- Subphylum: Chelicerata
- Class: Arachnida
- Order: Araneae
- Infraorder: Araneomorphae
- Family: Amaurobiidae
- Genus: Neuquenia; Mello-Leitão, 1940

Type species
- N. pallida Mello-Leitão, 1940

Species
- N. pallida Mello-Leitão, 1940 – Argentina; N. paupercula (Simon, 1905) – Argentina

Genus of spiders

Neuquenia is a genus of South American tangled nest spiders first described by Cândido Firmino de Mello-Leitão in 1940. As of April 2019 it contains only two species, both found in Argentina.
