= Dictynoidea =

The Dictynoidea or dictynoids are a group of araneomorph spiders that have been treated as a superfamily. The composition of the group has varied. Phylogenetic studies in the 21st century have failed to confirm the monophyly of the dictynoids as originally defined.

== Phylogeny ==
The "classical" circumscription of Dictynoidea from the 1970s included the families Amauroboididae (now placed in Anyphaenidae), Anyphaenidae, Argyronetidae (now included in Cybaeidae), Dictynidae, Desidae, Hahniidae and Nicodamidae. In 1991, Coddington and Levi included "at least" Desidae, Dictynidae, Cybaeidae, Argyronetidae (now included in Cybaeidae), Hahniidae and Neolanidae (now Stiphidiidae) in Dictynoidea, which in their cladistic hypothesis for the phylogeny of the araneomorphs was presented as a clade within the RTA clade. However, they said that placing many families in Dictynoidea had more to do with "tradition than explicit justification".

In Jonathan A. Coddington's 2005 summary of the phylogeny and classification of spiders, Dictynoidea has disappeared. Desidae is an "agelenoid"; Dictynidae is the most basal family in the RTA clade; Cybaeidae and Hahniidae are "unplaced families"; Neolanidae (Amphinectidae) is a "stiphidioid". A 2009 "preferred topology" also put genera from Dictynidae at the base of the RTA clade and combined genera from Desidae and Agelenidae into a clade. A 2013 summary, shown below, grouped three members of the classical Dictynoidea into one clade, placing a fourth into another clade, but without naming any of the clades. Shaded names represent classical Dictynoidea.

- - - Hahniidae
    - - Dictynidae
      - Cybaeidae
  - - Agelenidae
    - - Desidae
      - - Amphinectidae (now Desidae)
        - Stiphidiidae

A 2017 study also did not support the Dictynoidea, but placed the families previously included in this group in a more widely defined "marronoid clade", comprising Amaurobiidae, Agelenidae, Cybaeidae, Cycloctenidae, Desidae, Dictynidae, Hahniidae, Stiphidiidae and Toxopidae.

== Families ==
Families included by some sources that used the name "Dictynoidea" are shown in the table below.

Family	"Classical" (1970s)	Coddington & Levi (1991)	Dunlop & Penny (2011)
Amphinectidae (now Desidae)	–	yes	–
Anyphaenidae (Amauroboididae)	yes	–	–
Cybaeidae (Argyronetidae)	yes	yes	yes
Desidae	yes	yes	yes
Dictynidae	yes	yes	yes
Hahniidae	yes	yes	yes
Nicodamidae	yes	–	–
