= Himalmartensus =

Scientific classification
- Kingdom: Animalia
- Phylum: Arthropoda
- Subphylum: Chelicerata
- Class: Arachnida
- Order: Araneae
- Infraorder: Araneomorphae
- Family: Amaurobiidae
- Genus: Himalmartensus; Wang & Zhu, 2008

Type species
- H. martensi Wang & Zhu, 2008

Species
- 4, see text

Genus of spiders

Himalmartensus is a genus of Asian tangled nest spiders first described by X. P. Wang & Ming-Sheng Zhu in 2008. It is found in India and Nepal.

== Species ==
As of October 2026 it contains four species:

- Himalmartensus ausobskyi Wang & Zhu, 2008 – Nepal
- Himalmartensus martensi Wang & Zhu, 2008 – Nepal
- Himalmartensus nandadevi Quasin, Siliwal & Uniyal, 2015 – India
- Himalmartensus nepalensis Wang & Zhu, 2008 – Nepal
