= Ovtchinnikovia =

Scientific classification
- Kingdom: Animalia
- Phylum: Arthropoda
- Subphylum: Chelicerata
- Class: Arachnida
- Order: Araneae
- Infraorder: Araneomorphae
- Family: Amaurobiidae
- Genus: Ovtchinnikovia
- Species: O. caucasica

Binomial name
- Ovtchinnikovia caucasica Marusik, Kovblyuk & Ponomarev, 2010

Genus of spiders

Ovtchinnikovia is a genus of Asian tangled nest spiders containing the single species, Ovtchinnikovia caucasica. It was first described by Yuri M. Marusik, M. M. Kovblyuk & A. V. Ponomarev in 2010, and has only been found in Russia.
