= Virgilus =

Scientific classification
- Domain: Eukaryota
- Kingdom: Animalia
- Phylum: Arthropoda
- Subphylum: Chelicerata
- Class: Arachnida
- Order: Araneae
- Infraorder: Araneomorphae
- Family: Amaurobiidae
- Genus: Virgilus
- Species: V. normalis

Binomial name
- Virgilus normalis Roth, 1967

Genus of spiders

Virgilus is a genus of South American tangled nest spiders containing the single species, Virgilus normalis. It was first described by V. D. Roth in 1967, and has only been found in Ecuador.
