= Storenosoma =

Scientific classification
- Kingdom: Animalia
- Phylum: Arthropoda
- Subphylum: Chelicerata
- Class: Arachnida
- Order: Araneae
- Infraorder: Araneomorphae
- Family: Amaurobiidae
- Genus: Storenosoma; Hogg, 1900

Type species
- S. hoggi (Roewer, 1942)

Species
- 13, see text

Genus of spiders

Storenosoma is a genus of Australian tangled nest spiders first described by Henry Roughton Hogg in 1900.

== Species ==
As of October 2026 it contains thirteen species:

- Storenosoma altum Davies, 1986 – Australia (Queensland, New South Wales)
- Storenosoma bifidum Milledge, 2011 – Australia (Victoria)
- Storenosoma bondi Milledge, 2011 – Australia (New South Wales)
- Storenosoma forsteri Milledge, 2011 – Australia (New South Wales, Australian Capital Territory)
- Storenosoma grayi Milledge, 2011 – Australia (New South Wales)
- Storenosoma grossum Milledge, 2011 – Australia (Victoria)
- Storenosoma hoggi (Roewer, 1942) – Australia (New South Wales, Victoria)
- Storenosoma picadilly Milledge, 2011 – Australia (New South Wales, Australian Capital Territory)
- Storenosoma smithae Milledge, 2011 – Australia (New South Wales)
- Storenosoma supernum Davies, 1986 – Australia (Queensland, New South Wales)
- Storenosoma tasmaniensis Milledge, 2011 – Australia (Tasmania)
- Storenosoma terraneum Davies, 1986 – Australia (Queensland to Victoria)
- Storenosoma victoria Milledge, 2011 – Australia (Victoria)
