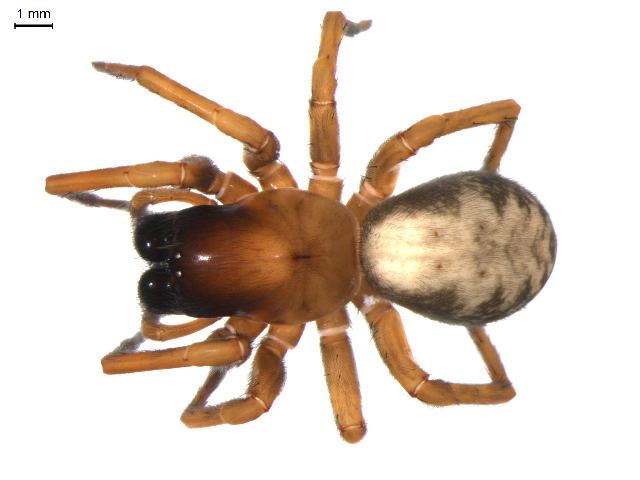
- C. bennetti, female

Conservation status
- Secure (NatureServe)

Scientific classification
- Kingdom: Animalia
- Phylum: Arthropoda
- Subphylum: Chelicerata
- Class: Arachnida
- Order: Araneae
- Infraorder: Araneomorphae
- Family: Amaurobiidae
- Genus: Callobius
- Species: C. bennetti

Binomial name
- Callobius bennetti Blackwall, 1846

Synonyms
- Ciniflo bennetti (Blackwall, 1846); Amaurobius bennetti (Banks, 1895); Callobius bennetti (Chamberlin, 1947)

= Callobius bennetti =

Species of spider

Callobius bennetti is a species of spider in the family Amaurobiidae. It has multiple common names: hackled mesh weaver, hacklemesh weaver, night spider, and tangled nest spider. They sometimes could be mistaken for hobo spiders. The species is found in North America.

== Description ==
Callobius bennetti has a reddish-brown cephalothorax and legs, and a grey abdomen with light markings on the dorsal surface.
