= Wabarra =

Scientific classification
- Kingdom: Animalia
- Phylum: Arthropoda
- Subphylum: Chelicerata
- Class: Arachnida
- Order: Araneae
- Infraorder: Araneomorphae
- Family: Amaurobiidae
- Genus: Wabarra; Davies, 1996

Type species
- W. pallida Davies, 1996

Species
- W. caverna Davies, 1996 – Australia (Queensland); W. pallida Davies, 1996 – Australia (Queensland)

Genus of spiders

Wabarra is a genus of Australian tangled nest spiders in Queensland first described by V. T. Davies in 1996. As of October 2026 it contains only two species.
