= Daviesa =

Scientific classification
- Kingdom: Animalia
- Phylum: Arthropoda
- Subphylum: Chelicerata
- Class: Arachnida
- Order: Araneae
- Infraorder: Araneomorphae
- Family: Amaurobiidae
- Genus: Daviesa; Koçak & Kemal, 2008

Type species
- D. lubinae (Davies, 1993)

Species
- D. gallonae (Davies, 1993) – Australia (Queensland); D. lubinae (Davies, 1993) – Australia (Queensland)

Genus of spiders

Daviesa is a genus of Australian tangled nest spiders first described by A. Ö. Koçak & M. Kemal in 2008. This genus is named in honour of New Zealand arachnologist Valerie Todd Davies. As of October 2026 it contains only two species.
