= Sinoamaurobius =

Scientific classification
- Kingdom: Animalia
- Phylum: Arthropoda
- Subphylum: Chelicerata
- Class: Arachnida
- Order: Araneae
- Infraorder: Araneomorphae
- Family: Amaurobiidae
- Subfamily: Amaurobiinae
- Genus: Sinoamaurobius; Kong, Zhang & Wang, 2025

Type species
- S. yintiaoling Kong, Zhang & Wang, 2025

Species
- 7, see text

Genus of spiders

Sinoamaurobius is a genus of spiders in the family Amaurobiidae.

== Distribution ==
All described species in this genus are endemic to China.

Its species are found in Chongqing, Sichuan, and Shaanxi provinces, stretching from the south slope of the Qinling Mountains to the eastern extension of the Hengduan Mountains.

== Life style ==
Sinoamaurobius inhabits leaf litter on evergreen forest floors.

== Description ==
Members of this genus are similar to Amaurobius, but smaller, with a range in body size from 3.20 to 4.76 mm. The eye region is black, the legs are yellowish.

== Etymology ==
The genus name is a combination of Latin sino- "Chinese" and the genus Amaurobius.

== Species ==
As of October 2026, this genus includes seven species:

- Sinoamaurobius baima Kong, Zhang & Wang, 2025 – China
- Sinoamaurobius chengkou Kong, Zhang & Wang, 2025 – China
- Sinoamaurobius guangwushanensis (Wang, Irfan, Zhou & Zhang, 2023) – China
- Sinoamaurobius songi (L. Zhang, Wang & Z. S. Zhang, 2018) – China
- Sinoamaurobius spinatus (L. Zhang, Wang & Z. S. Zhang, 2018) – China
- Sinoamaurobius wulongdongensis (Wang, Irfan, Zhou & Zhang, 2023) – China
- Sinoamaurobius yintiaoling Kong, Zhang & Wang, 2025 – China (type species)
