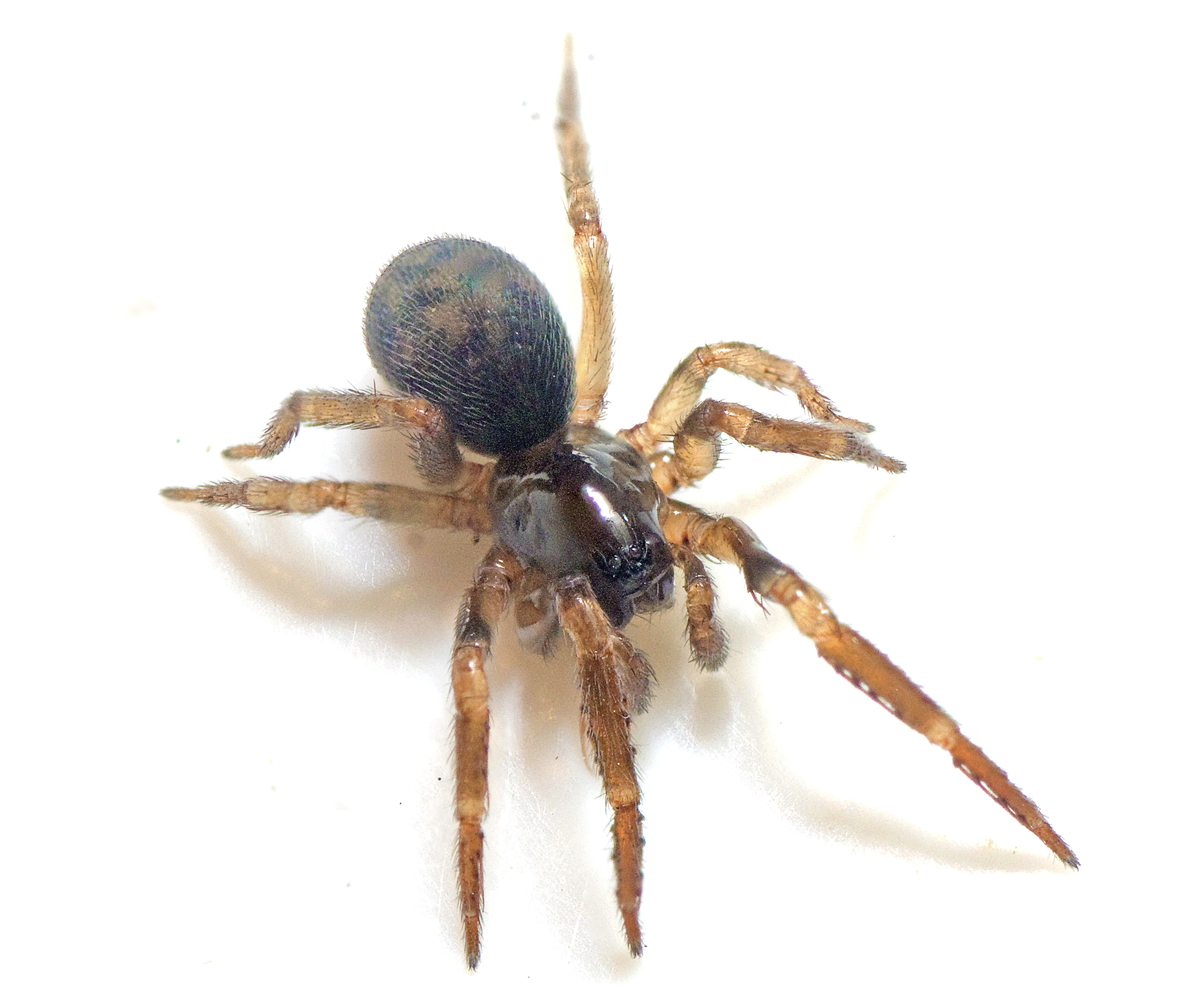
- Dardurus spinipes

Scientific classification
- Kingdom: Animalia
- Phylum: Arthropoda
- Subphylum: Chelicerata
- Class: Arachnida
- Order: Araneae
- Infraorder: Araneomorphae
- Family: Amaurobiidae
- Genus: Dardurus; Davies, 1976

Type species
- D. spinipes Davies, 1976

Species
- 6, see text

= Dardurus =

Genus of spiders

Dardurus is a genus of Australian tangled nest spiders first described by V. T. Davies in 1976.

== Species ==
As of October 2026 it contains six species:

- Dardurus agrestis Davies, 1976 – Australia (Queensland)
- Dardurus nemoralis Davies, 1976 – Australia (Queensland)
- Dardurus saltuosus Davies, 1976 – Australia (New South Wales)
- Dardurus silvaticus Davies, 1976 – Australia (Queensland)
- Dardurus spinipes Davies, 1976 – Australia (Queensland)
- Dardurus tamborinensis Davies, 1976 – Australia (Queensland)
