= Altellopsis =

Scientific classification
- Kingdom: Animalia
- Phylum: Arthropoda
- Subphylum: Chelicerata
- Class: Arachnida
- Order: Araneae
- Infraorder: Araneomorphae
- Family: Amaurobiidae
- Genus: Altellopsis
- Species: A. helveola

Binomial name
- Altellopsis helveola Simon, 1905

Genus of spiders

Altellopsis is a genus of South American tangled nest spiders containing the single species, Altellopsis helveola. It was first described by Eugène Simon in 1905, and has only been found in Argentina.
