= Ecurobius =

Scientific classification
- Kingdom: Animalia
- Phylum: Arthropoda
- Subphylum: Chelicerata
- Class: Arachnida
- Order: Araneae
- Infraorder: Araneomorphae
- Family: Amaurobiidae
- Genus: Ecurobius; Zamani & Marusik, 2021
- Species: E. parthicus

Binomial name
- Ecurobius parthicus Zamani & Marusik, 2021

Genus of spiders

Ecurobius is a monotypic genus of Middle Eastern tangled nest spiders containing the single species, Ecurobius parthicus. It was first described by Alireza Zamani and Yuri M. Marusik in 2021, and it has only been found in Iran.
