= Taira (spider) =

Scientific classification
- Kingdom: Animalia
- Phylum: Arthropoda
- Subphylum: Chelicerata
- Class: Arachnida
- Order: Araneae
- Infraorder: Araneomorphae
- Family: Amaurobiidae
- Genus: Taira; Lehtinen, 1967

Type species
- T. flavidorsalis (Yaginuma, 1964)

Species
- 17, see text

Genus of spiders

Taira is a genus of East Asian tangled nest spiders first described by Pekka T. Lehtinen in 1967.

== Species ==
As of October 2026 it contains seventeen species:

- Taira borneoensis Zhao, Wang, Irfan & Zhang, 2021 — Malaysia (Borneo)
- Taira cangshan Zhang, Zhu & Song, 2008 — China
- Taira concava Zhang, Zhu & Song, 2008 — China
- Taira decorata (Yin & Bao, 2001) — China
- Taira flavidorsalis (Yaginuma, 1964) — China, Japan
- Taira gyaisiensis Zhao, Wang, Irfan & Zhang, 2021 — China
- Taira latilabiata Zhang, Zhu & Song, 2008 — China
- Taira liboensis Zhu, Chen & Zhang, 2004 — China
- Taira nyagqukaensis Zhao, Wang, Irfan & Zhang, 2021 — China
- Taira obtusa Zhang, Zhu & Song, 2008 — China
- Taira qiuae Wang, Jäger & Zhang, 2010 — China
- Taira sichuanensis Wang, Jäger & Zhang, 2010 — China
- Taira sulciformis Zhang, Zhu & Song, 2008 — China
- Taira wanzhouensis Zhao, Wang, Irfan & Zhang, 2021 — China
- Taira xuanenensis Zhao, Wang, Irfan & Zhang, 2021 — China
- Taira yangi Zhao, Wang, Irfan & Zhang, 2021 — China
- Taira zhui Wang, Jäger & Zhang, 2010 — China
