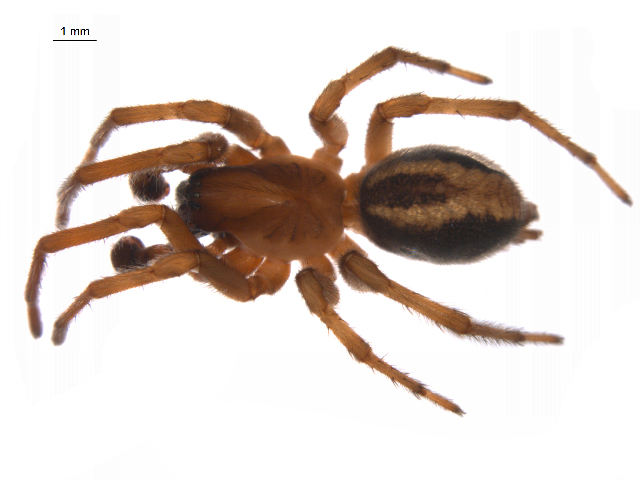
- A. agelenoides, male
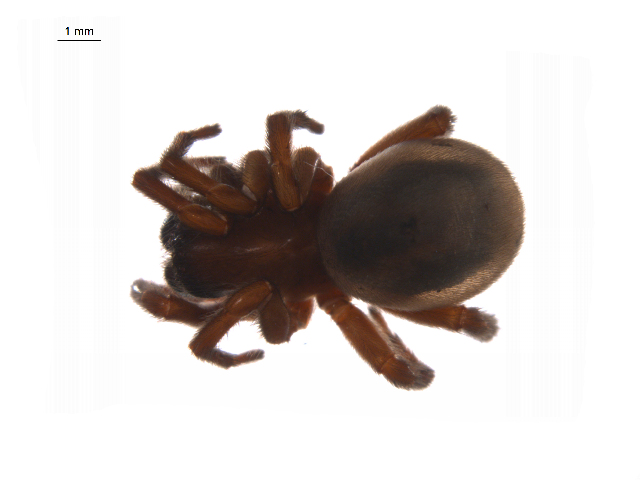
- A. agelenoides, female

Scientific classification
- Domain: Eukaryota
- Kingdom: Animalia
- Phylum: Arthropoda
- Subphylum: Chelicerata
- Class: Arachnida
- Order: Araneae
- Infraorder: Araneomorphae
- Family: Amaurobiidae
- Genus: Arctobius
- Species: A. agelenoides

Binomial name
- Arctobius agelenoides Lehtinen, 1967

= Arctobius =

Genus of spiders

Arctobius is a genus of tangled nest spiders containing the single species, Arctobius agelenoides. It was first described by Pekka T. Lehtinen in 1967, with a holarctic distribution.
