= Yacolla =

Scientific classification
- Domain: Eukaryota
- Kingdom: Animalia
- Phylum: Arthropoda
- Subphylum: Chelicerata
- Class: Arachnida
- Order: Araneae
- Infraorder: Araneomorphae
- Family: Amaurobiidae
- Genus: Yacolla
- Species: Y. pikelinae

Binomial name
- Yacolla pikelinae Lehtinen, 1967

Genus of spiders

Yacolla is a genus of South American tangled nest spiders containing the single species, Yacolla pikelinae. It was first described by Pekka T. Lehtinen in 1967, and has only been found in Brazil.
