= Tugana =

Scientific classification
- Kingdom: Animalia
- Phylum: Arthropoda
- Subphylum: Chelicerata
- Class: Arachnida
- Order: Araneae
- Infraorder: Araneomorphae
- Family: Amaurobiidae
- Genus: Tugana; Chamberlin, 1948

Type species
- T. cavatica (Bryant, 1940)

Species
- 4, see text

Synonyms
- Alauximus

Genus of spiders

Tugana is a genus of Caribbean tangled nest spiders first described by R. V. Chamberlin in 1948.

== Species ==
As of October 2026 it contains four species, found in Cuba and Hispaniola:

- Tugana cavatica (Bryant, 1940) – Cuba
- Tugana crassa (Bryant, 1948) – Hispaniola
- Tugana cudina Alayón, 1992 – Cuba
- Tugana infumata (Bryant, 1948) – Hispaniola
