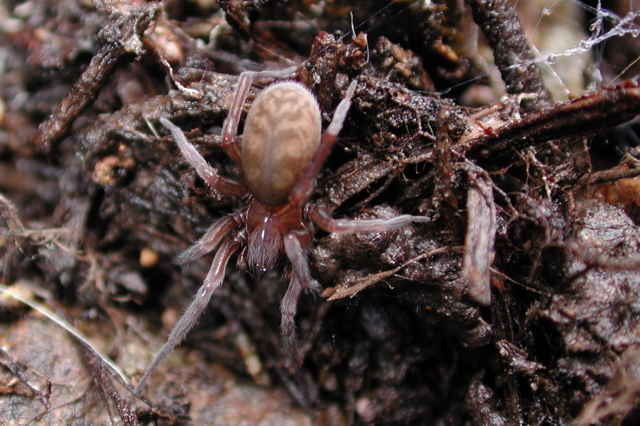
- Pimus sp.

Scientific classification
- Kingdom: Animalia
- Phylum: Arthropoda
- Subphylum: Chelicerata
- Class: Arachnida
- Order: Araneae
- Infraorder: Araneomorphae
- Family: Amaurobiidae
- Genus: Pimus; Chamberlin, 1947

Type species
- P. pitus Chamberlin, 1947

Species
- 10, see text

= Pimus =

Genus of spiders

Pimus is a genus of North American tangled nest spiders first described by R. V. Chamberlin in 1947.

== Species ==
As of October 2026 it contains ten species, all found in United States:

- Pimus desiccatus Leech, 1972 – USA
- Pimus eldorado Leech, 1972 – USA
- Pimus fractus (Chamberlin, 1920) – USA
- Pimus hesperellus Chamberlin, 1947 – USA
- Pimus iviei Leech, 1972 – USA
- Pimus leucus Chamberlin, 1947 – USA
- Pimus napa Leech, 1972 – USA
- Pimus nawtawaketus Leech, 1972 – USA
- Pimus pitus Chamberlin, 1947 – USA
- Pimus salemensis Leech, 1972 – USA
