= Oztira =

Scientific classification
- Kingdom: Animalia
- Phylum: Arthropoda
- Subphylum: Chelicerata
- Class: Arachnida
- Order: Araneae
- Infraorder: Araneomorphae
- Family: Amaurobiidae
- Genus: Oztira; Milledge, 2011

Type species
- O. affinis (Hickman, 1981)

Species
- 4, see text

Genus of spiders

Oztira is a genus of Australian tangled nest spiders first described by G. A. Milledge in 2011.

== Species ==
As of October 2026 it contains four species:

- Oztira affinis (Hickman, 1981) – Australia (Tasmania)
- Oztira aquilonaria (Davies, 1986) – Australia (Queensland)
- Oztira kroombit Milledge, 2011 – Australia (Queensland)
- Oztira summa (Davies, 1986) – Australia (Queensland)
