= Tymbira =

Scientific classification
- Domain: Eukaryota
- Kingdom: Animalia
- Phylum: Arthropoda
- Subphylum: Chelicerata
- Class: Arachnida
- Order: Araneae
- Infraorder: Araneomorphae
- Family: Amaurobiidae
- Genus: Tymbira
- Species: T. brunnea

Binomial name
- Tymbira brunnea Mello-Leitão, 1944

Genus of spiders

Tymbira is a genus of South American tangled nest spiders containing the single species, Tymbira brunnea. It was first described by Cândido Firmino de Mello-Leitão in 1944, and has only been found in Argentina.
