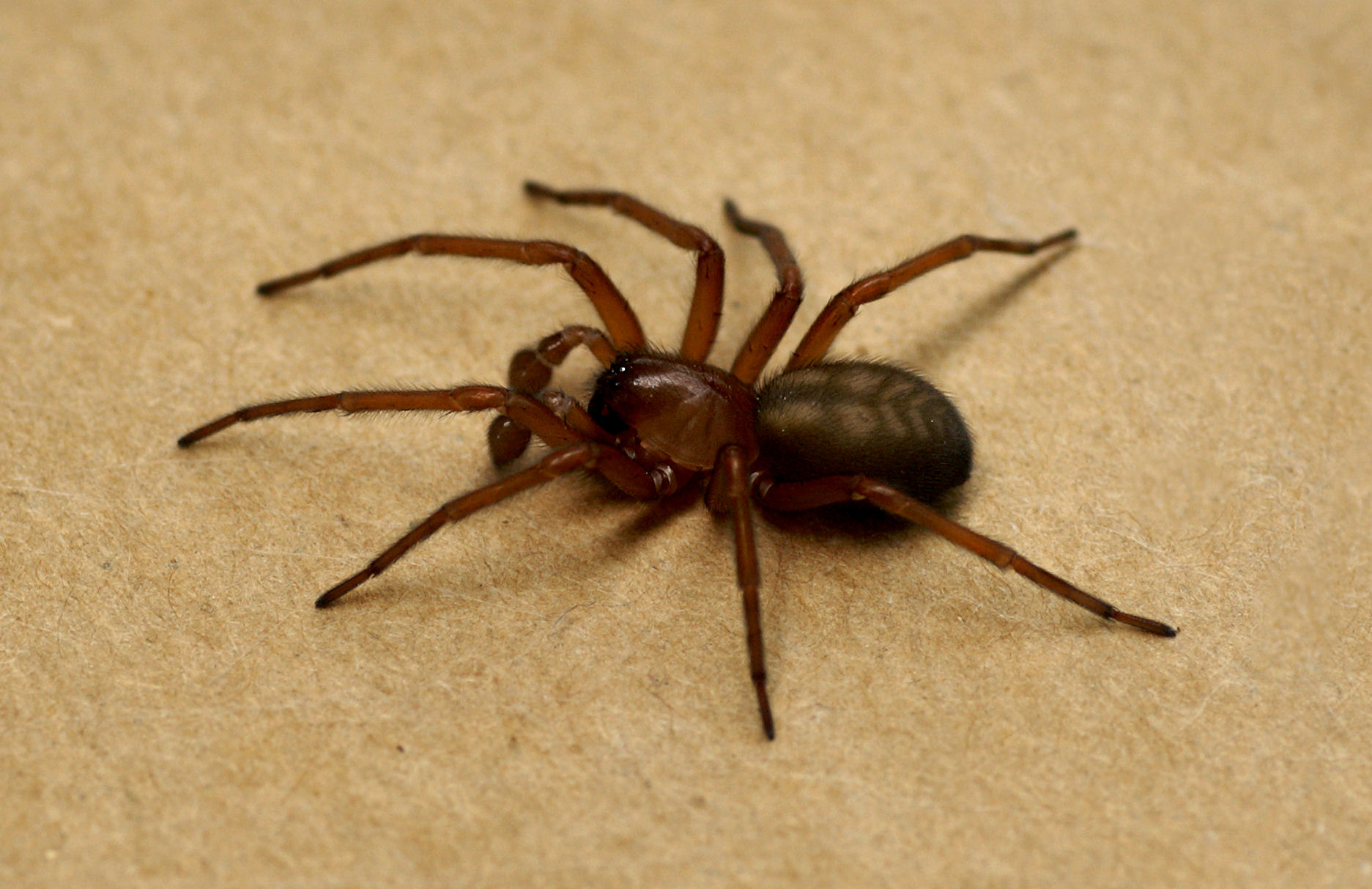
- Callobius severus from Canada
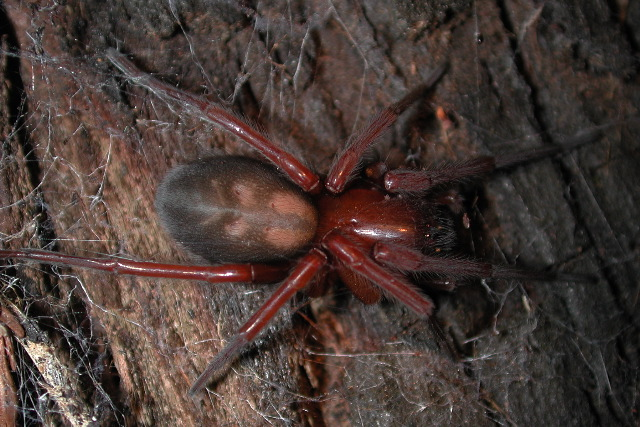
- Callobius sp.

Scientific classification
- Kingdom: Animalia
- Phylum: Arthropoda
- Subphylum: Chelicerata
- Class: Arachnida
- Order: Araneae
- Infraorder: Araneomorphae
- Family: Amaurobiidae
- Genus: Callobius; Chamberlin, 1947

Type species
- C. bennetti (Blackwall, 1846)

Species
- 35, see text

= Callobius =

Genus of spiders

Callobius is a genus of tangled nest spiders first described by R. V. Chamberlin in 1947.

== Species ==
As of October 2026 it contains thirty-five species with a holarctic distribution:

- Callobius amamiensis Okumura, Honki & Ohba, 2018 – Japan
- Callobius angelus (Chamberlin & Ivie, 1947) – USA
- Callobius arizonicus (Chamberlin & Ivie, 1947) – USA, Mexico
- Callobius balcanicus (Drensky, 1940) – Bulgaria
- Callobius bennetti (Blackwall, 1846) – USA, Canada
- Callobius breviprocessus Okumura, Suzuki & Serita, 2020 – Japan (Ryukyu Is.)
- Callobius canada (Chamberlin & Ivie, 1947) – USA, Canada
- Callobius cavernarius Okumura & Suzuki, 2022 – Japan (Ryukyu Is.)
- Callobius changbaishan X. Y. Zhang, Wang, Zhou & Z. S. Zhang, 2023 – China
- Callobius claustrarius (Hahn, 1833) – Europe, Turkey, Caucasus to Kazakhstan
- Callobius deces (Chamberlin & Ivie, 1947) – USA
- Callobius enus (Chamberlin & Ivie, 1947) – USA, Canada
- Callobius gertschi Leech, 1972 – USA
- Callobius guachama Leech, 1972 – USA
- Callobius hokkaido Leech, 1971 – Russia (Kurile Is.), Japan
- Callobius hyonasus Leech, 1972 – USA
- Callobius kamelus (Chamberlin & Ivie, 1947) – USA
- Callobius klamath Leech, 1972 – USA
- Callobius koreanus (Paik, 1966) – Korea
- Callobius manzanita Leech, 1972 – USA
- Callobius nevadensis (Simon, 1884) – USA
- Callobius nomeus (Chamberlin, 1919) – USA, Canada
- Callobius olympus (Chamberlin & Ivie, 1947) – USA
- Callobius panther Leech, 1972 – USA
- Callobius paskenta Leech, 1972 – USA
- Callobius pauculus Leech, 1972 – USA
- Callobius paynei Leech, 1972 – USA
- Callobius pictus (Simon, 1884) – USA, Canada
- Callobius rothi Leech, 1972 – USA
- Callobius severus (Simon, 1884) – USA, Canada
- Callobius shimojanai Okumura & Suzuki, 2022 – Japan (Ryukyu Is.)
- Callobius sierra Leech, 1972 – USA
- Callobius tamarus (Chamberlin & Ivie, 1947) – USA
- Callobius tehama Leech, 1972 – USA
- Callobius yakushimensis Okumura, 2010 – Japan
