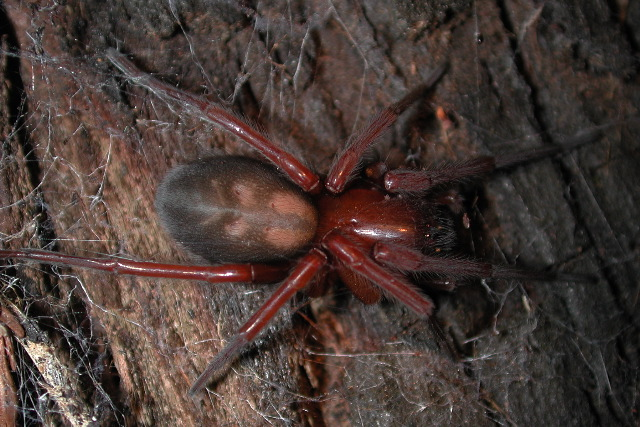
- Callobius sp.
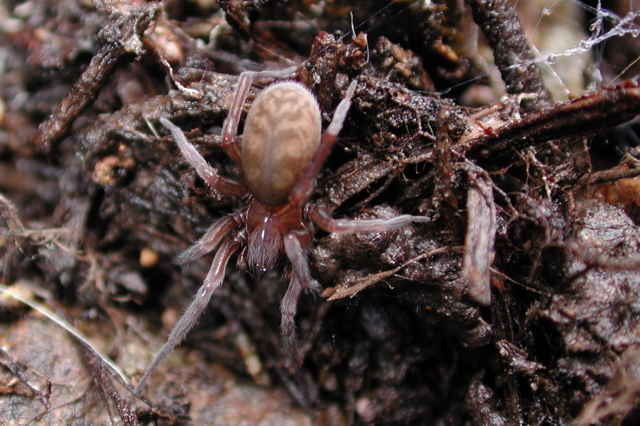
- Pimus sp.

Scientific classification
- Kingdom: Animalia
- Phylum: Arthropoda
- Subphylum: Chelicerata
- Class: Arachnida
- Order: Araneae
- Infraorder: Araneomorphae
- Clade: Marronoid clade
- Family: Amaurobiidae; Thorell, 1869

Diversity
- 27 genera, 210 species
- blue: reported countries (WSC) green: observation hotspots (iNaturalist)

= Amaurobiidae =

Tangled nest spiders Temporal range: Palaeogene–present

Family of spiders

Amaurobiidae is a family of three-clawed cribellate or ecribellate spiders found in crevices and hollows or under stones where they build retreats, and are often collected in pitfall traps. Unlidded burrows are sometimes quite obvious in crusty, loamy soil. They are difficult to distinguish from related spiders in other families, especially Agelenidae and Desidae. Their intra- and interfamilial relationships have been contentious.

In Australia, they are small to medium-sized entelegyne spiders with minimal sheet webs. They are fairly common in Tasmania and nearby mainland Australia in cooler rainforest, some in caves. They are widespread but uncommon along the eastern coastline. They generally have eight similar eyes in two conservatively curved rows. They often have a calamistrum on metatarsus IV associated with a cribellum. Australian amaurobiids may be distinguished from the Desidae by the absence of a pretarsal fracture and the presence of a retrocoxal hymen on coxa I.

== Reorganization ==
This family has lost and gained several genera resulting from wide-ranging DNA analysis of spider families. It lost Bakala and Manjala to Desidae, while Toxopidae took in Midgee and the monotypic genus Jamara. It also lost some of Australia's medium-sized brown spiders including Tasmabrochus, Tasmarubrius, and Teeatta) to Macrobunidae, all of which are claimed to be common in Tasmania and mainland Australia but are rarely seen or recorded. The lack of research replicability and absence of photographic proof in species and genus diagnosis has resulted in low performance in computer recognition models and citizen science platforms for these genera.

== Genera ==
As of October 2026, this family includes 27 genera. They are placed in four subfamilies, after Macrobuninae was elevated to a full family:

Altellopsinae Lehtinen, 1967:

- Altellopsis Simon, 1905 — Argentina
- Neuquenia Mello-Leitão, 1940 — Argentina
- Rhoicinaria Exline, 1950 — Colombia, Ecuador
- Tugana Chamberlin, 1948 — Cuba
- Yacolla Lehtinen, 1967 — Brazil
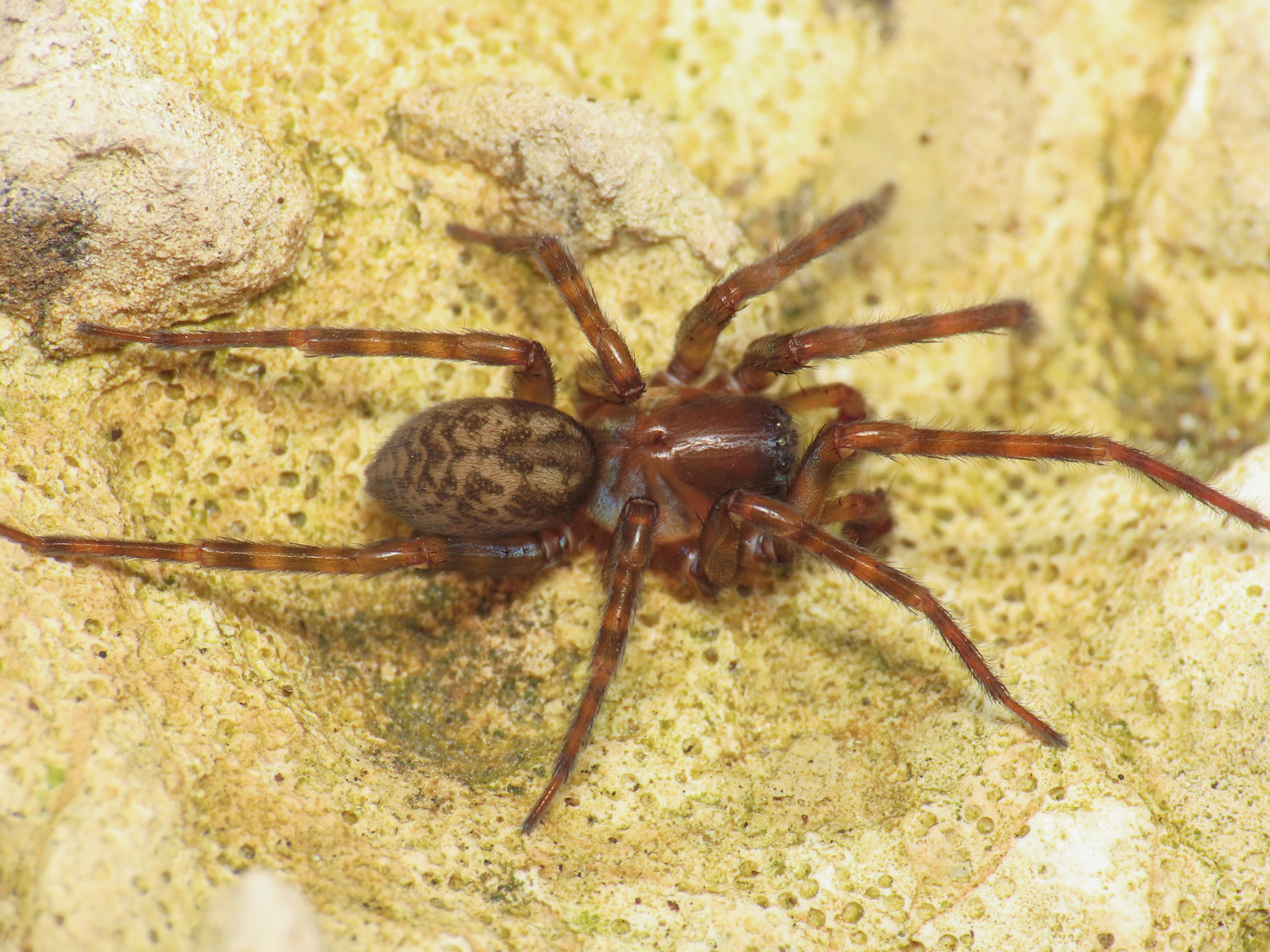
Amaurobius erberi

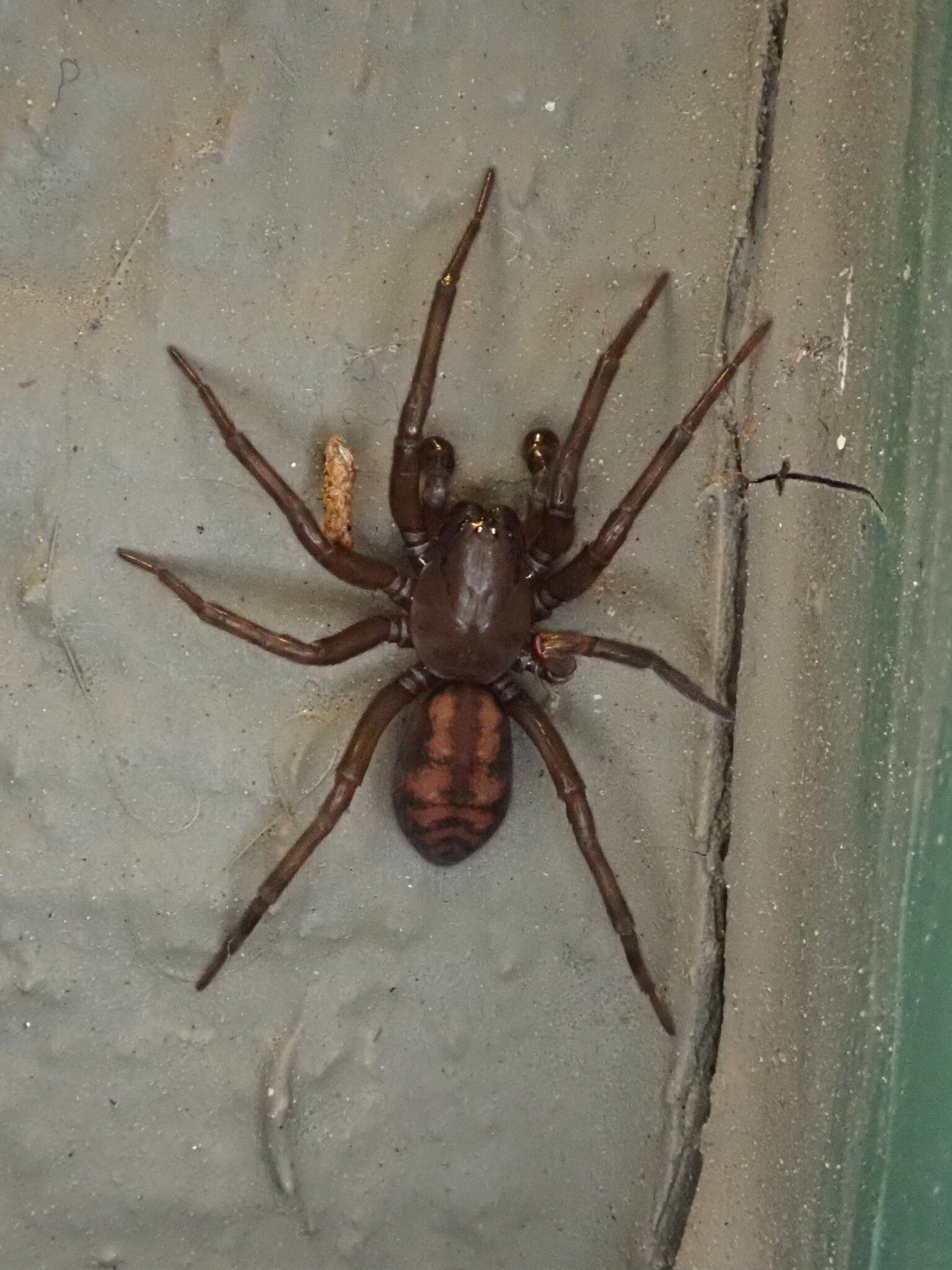
Callobius bennetti

Amaurobiinae Thorell, 1869:

- Amaurobius C. L. Koch, 1837 — North America, South America, Europe, Africa, Georgia, Micronesia
- Auhunga Forster & Wilton, 1973 — New Zealand
- Callobius Chamberlin, 1947 — North America, Bulgaria, Asia
- Cybaeopsis Strand, 1907 — North America, Asia
- Dardurus Davies, 1976 — Australia
- Daviesa Koçak & Kemal, 2008 — Australia
- Ecurobius Zamani & Marusik, 2021 — Iran
- Himalmartensus Wang & Zhu, 2008 — Nepal, India
- Maloides Forster & Wilton, 1989 — New Zealand
- Muritaia Forster & Wilton, 1973 — New Zealand
- Otira Forster & Wilton, 1973 — New Zealand
- Oztira Milledge, 2011 — Australia
- Pimus Chamberlin, 1947 — United States
- Sinoamaurobius Kong, Zhang & Wang, 2025 – China
- Storenosoma Hogg, 1900 — Australia
- Taira Lehtinen, 1967 — China, Japan
- Tymbira Mello-Leitão, 1944 — Argentina
- Virgilus Roth, 1967 — Ecuador
- Wabarra Davies, 1996 — Australia
- Waitetola Forster & Wilton, 1973 — New Zealand
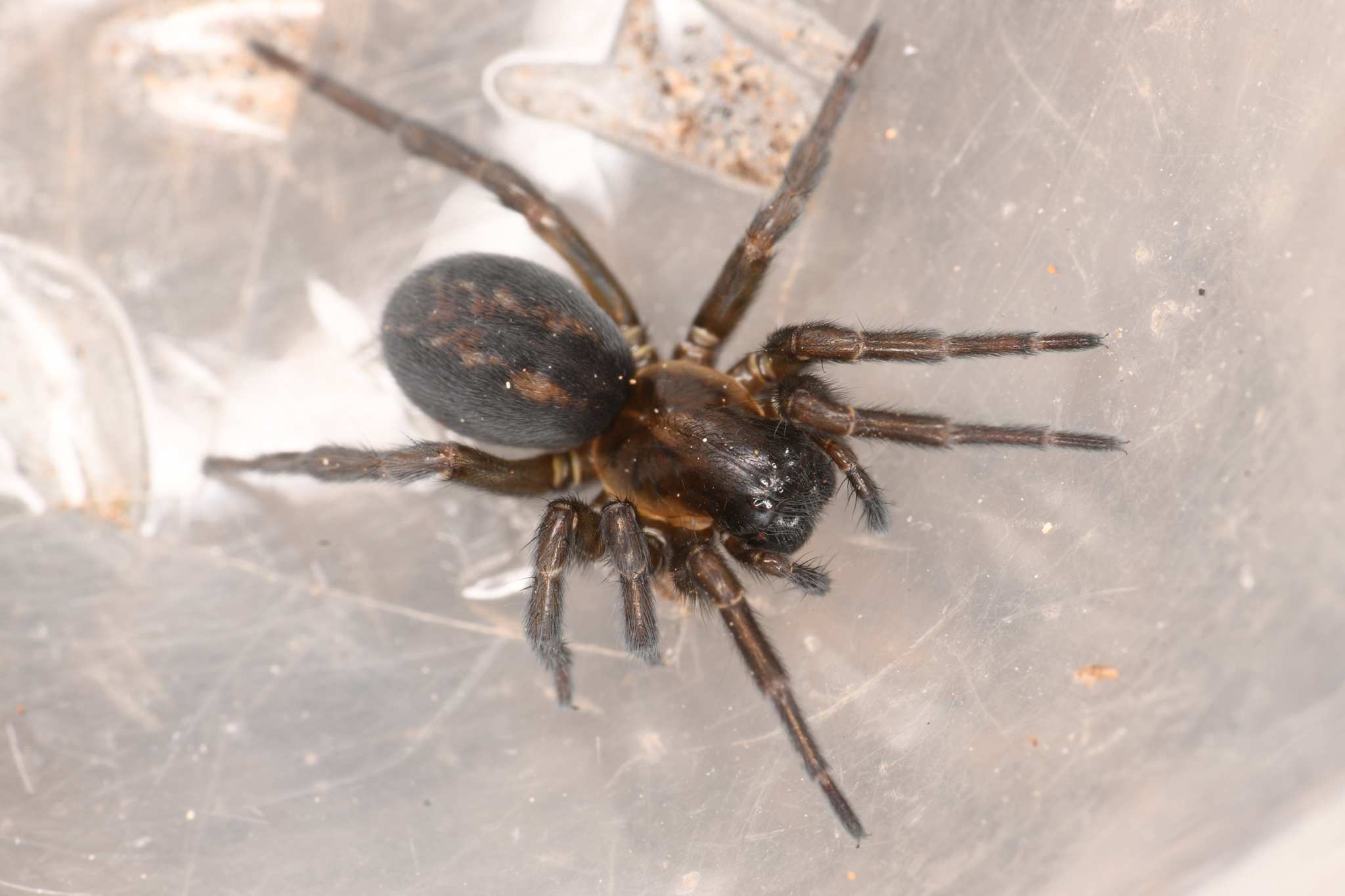
Arctobius agelenoides

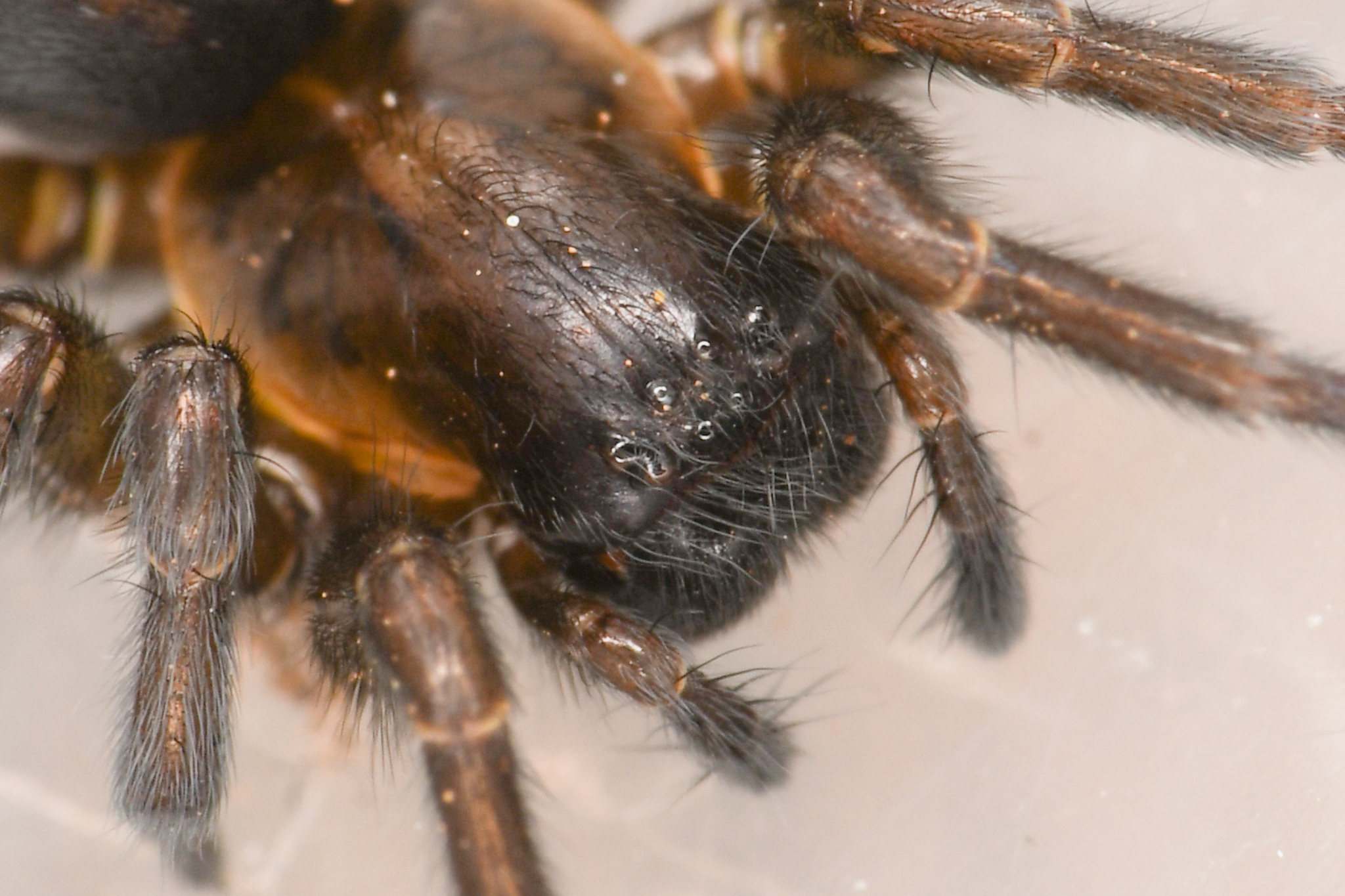
Arctobius agelenoides

Arctobiinae Leech, 1972:

- Arctobius Lehtinen, 1967 — United States, Canada, Russia

Ovtchinnikoviinae Marusik, Kovblyuk, & Ponomarev, 2010:

- Ovtchinnikovia Marusik, Kovblyuk & Ponomarev, 2010 – Russia (Caucasus)
