= Rhaeboctesis matroosbergensis =

Matroosberg Rhaeboctesis Sac Spider

Conservation status
- Least Concern (SANBI Red List)

Scientific classification
- Kingdom: Animalia
- Phylum: Arthropoda
- Subphylum: Chelicerata
- Class: Arachnida
- Order: Araneae
- Infraorder: Araneomorphae
- Family: Liocranidae
- Genus: Rhaeboctesis
- Species: R. matroosbergensis

Binomial name
- Rhaeboctesis matroosbergensis Tucker, 1920

Species of spider

Rhaeboctesis matroosbergensis is a species of spider in the family Liocranidae. It is endemic to South Africa and is commonly known as the Matroosberg rhaeboctesis sac spider.

== Distribution ==
Rhaeboctesis matroosbergensis is found only in the Western Cape province of South Africa. It has been recorded from the Matroosberg (the type locality), Bontebok National Park, Cederberg Wilderness Area, and Klapmuts.

== Habitat and ecology ==
The species inhabits Fynbos biomes at altitudes ranging from 63 to 1,584 m above sea level. These are free-running ground spiders.

== Description ==
Rhaeboctesis matroosbergensis is known only from females..

== Conservation ==
Rhaeboctesis matroosbergensis is listed as Least Concern. Although known from only one sex, this species has a relatively wide range in the Fynbos and is likely to be under-collected. It is currently protected in Bontebok National Park and the Cederberg Wilderness Area.

== Taxonomy ==
The species was originally described by Tucker in 1920 from the Matroosberg. The genus remains unrevised.
