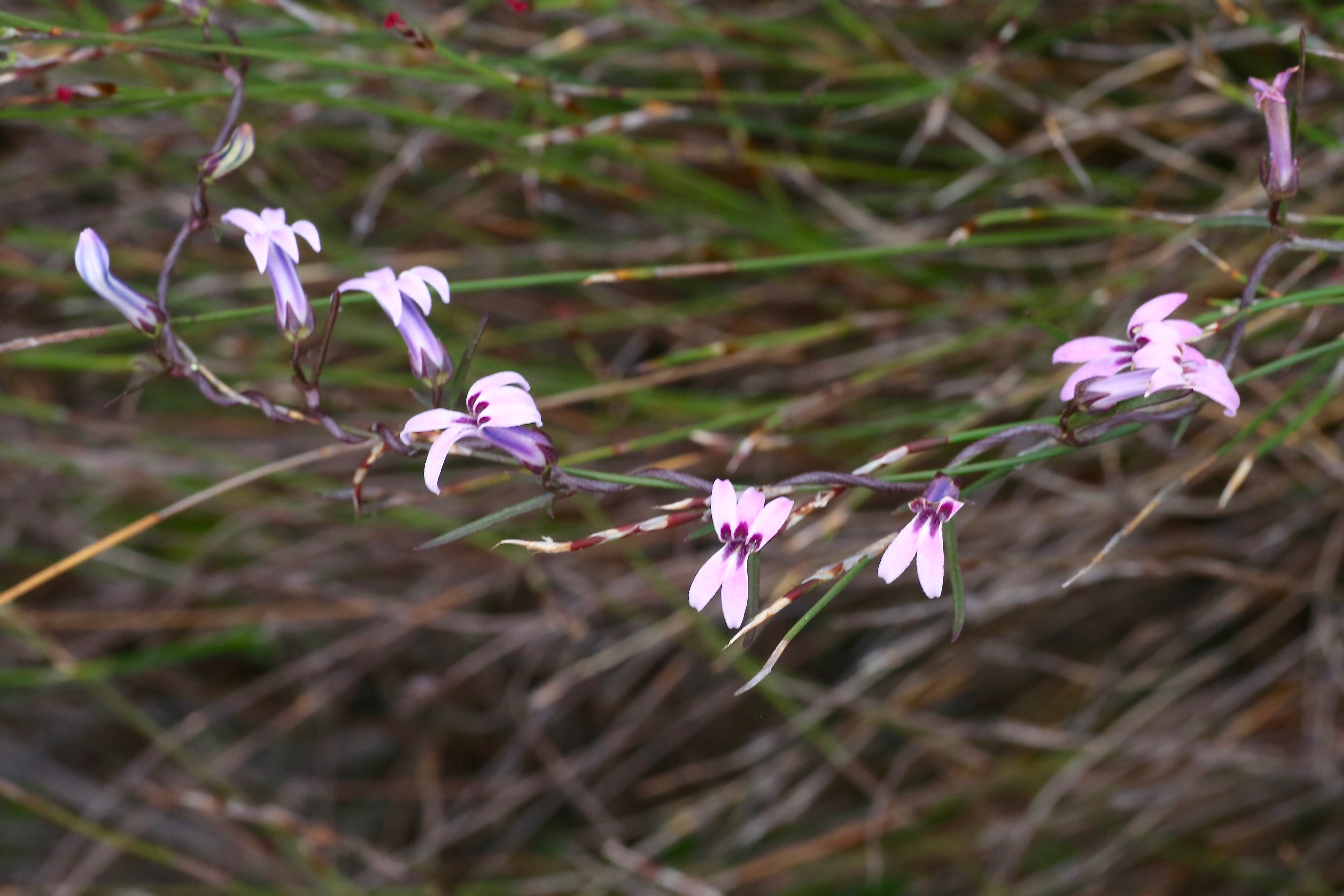

Conservation status
- Least Concern (SANBI Red List)

Scientific classification
- Kingdom: Plantae
- Clade: Tracheophytes
- Clade: Angiosperms
- Clade: Eudicots
- Clade: Asterids
- Order: Asterales
- Family: Campanulaceae
- Genus: Cyphia
- Species: C. volubilis

Binomial name
- Cyphia volubilis (Burm.f.) Willd.

= Cyphia volubilis =

Species of climbing Fynbos plant

Cyphia volubilis is a species of flowering plant in the genus Cyphia, endemic to the Western Cape. It is a type of Fynbos climbing plant that uses a host to get its own flowers above ground. It has a bilabiate corolla; with 3 lobes on top and 2 at the bottom.

== Description ==
Cyphia volubilis is a twining climber, with an underground tuber.

The leaves are simple, linear, entire, and often densely denticulate. The bracts can resemble leaves; they are entire or with a protruding or lobed tooth on both sides at the base (rarely they can appear 3-lobed).

The flower shape is bilabiate, with the corolla tube divided entirely into two (three petals curved upwards, two down). This species has very short stamens, 3-4mm long (only a quarter to a third of the length of the corolla). The flower colour is white or a pale grey-purple-ish colour. There are usually some tiny purple spots on the inside of the petals, deep inside the flower.

It is closely related to, and often confused with, other southern Cape species such as Cyphia digitata and Cyphia sylvatica.
