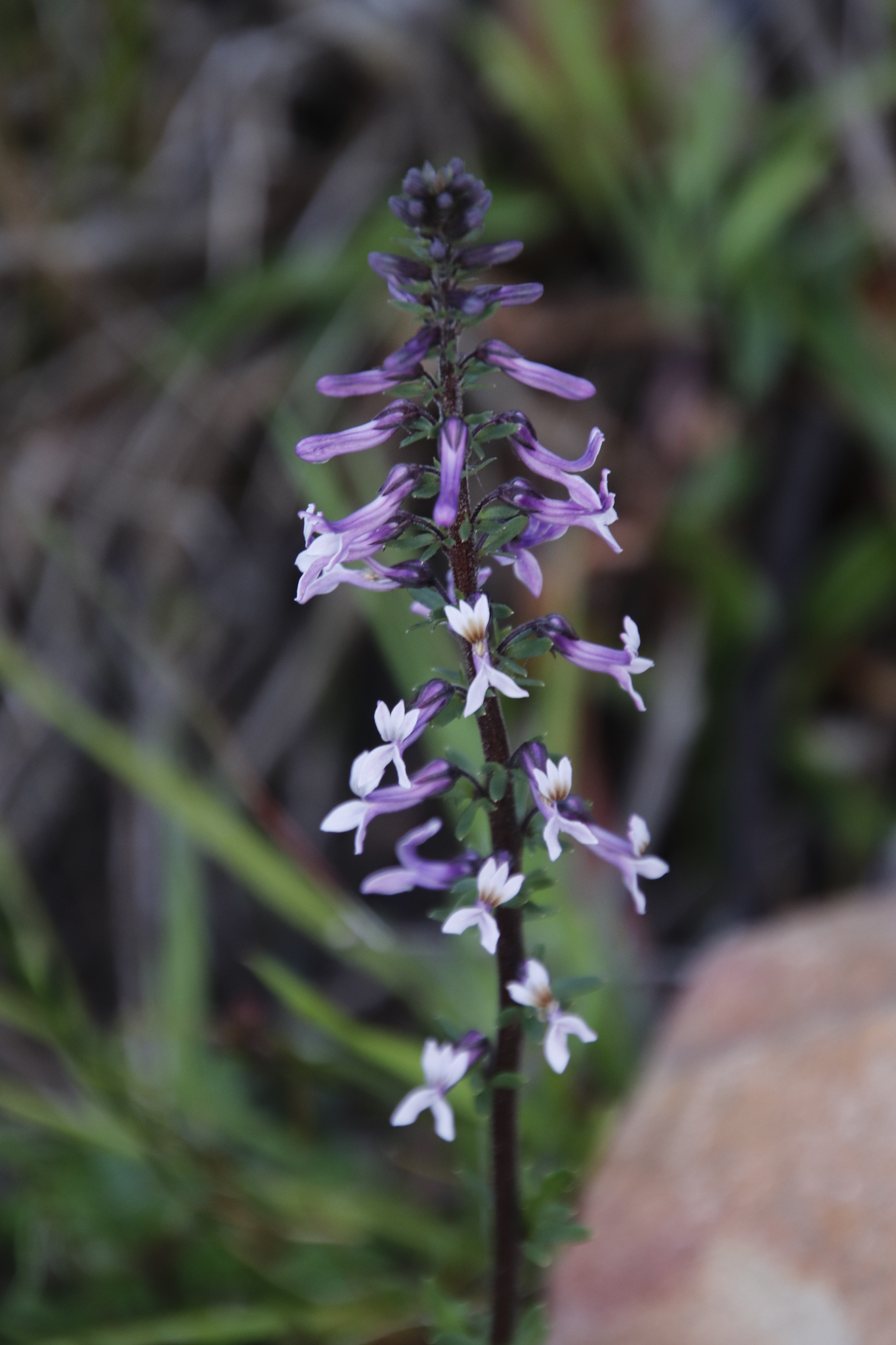

Scientific classification
- Kingdom: Plantae
- Clade: Tracheophytes
- Clade: Angiosperms
- Clade: Eudicots
- Clade: Asterids
- Order: Asterales
- Family: Campanulaceae
- Genus: Cyphia
- Species: C. bulbosa

Binomial name
- Cyphia bulbosa (L.) P.J.Bergius

Synonyms
- Cyphia botrys Willd.; Cyphia botrys Willd. ex Schult.; Cyphia bulbosa f. lobata E.Wimm.; Cyphia bulbosa var. acocksii E.Wimm.; Cyphia bulbosa var. angustiloba A.DC.; Cyphia bulbosa var. bulbosa; Cyphia bulbosa var. hafstroemii E.Wimm.; Cyphia bulbosa var. leiandra E.Wimm.; Cyphia bulbosa var. orientalis E.Phillips; Cyphia bulbosa var. pinnatifida C.Presl; Cyphia capense J.F.Gmel.; Cyphia kerastes E.Wimm.; Cyphia stephensii E.Wimm.; Cyphopsis bulbosa (L.) Kuntze; Lobelia bulbosa L.; Lobelia cyphia J.F.Gmel.; Lobelia tuberosa Burm.f.; Rapuntium bulbosum (L.) Chaz.

= Cyphia bulbosa =

South African plant species

Cyphia bulbosa, also known by its common name Bulb Baroe, is a species of flowering plant from the genus Cyphia.

== Description ==
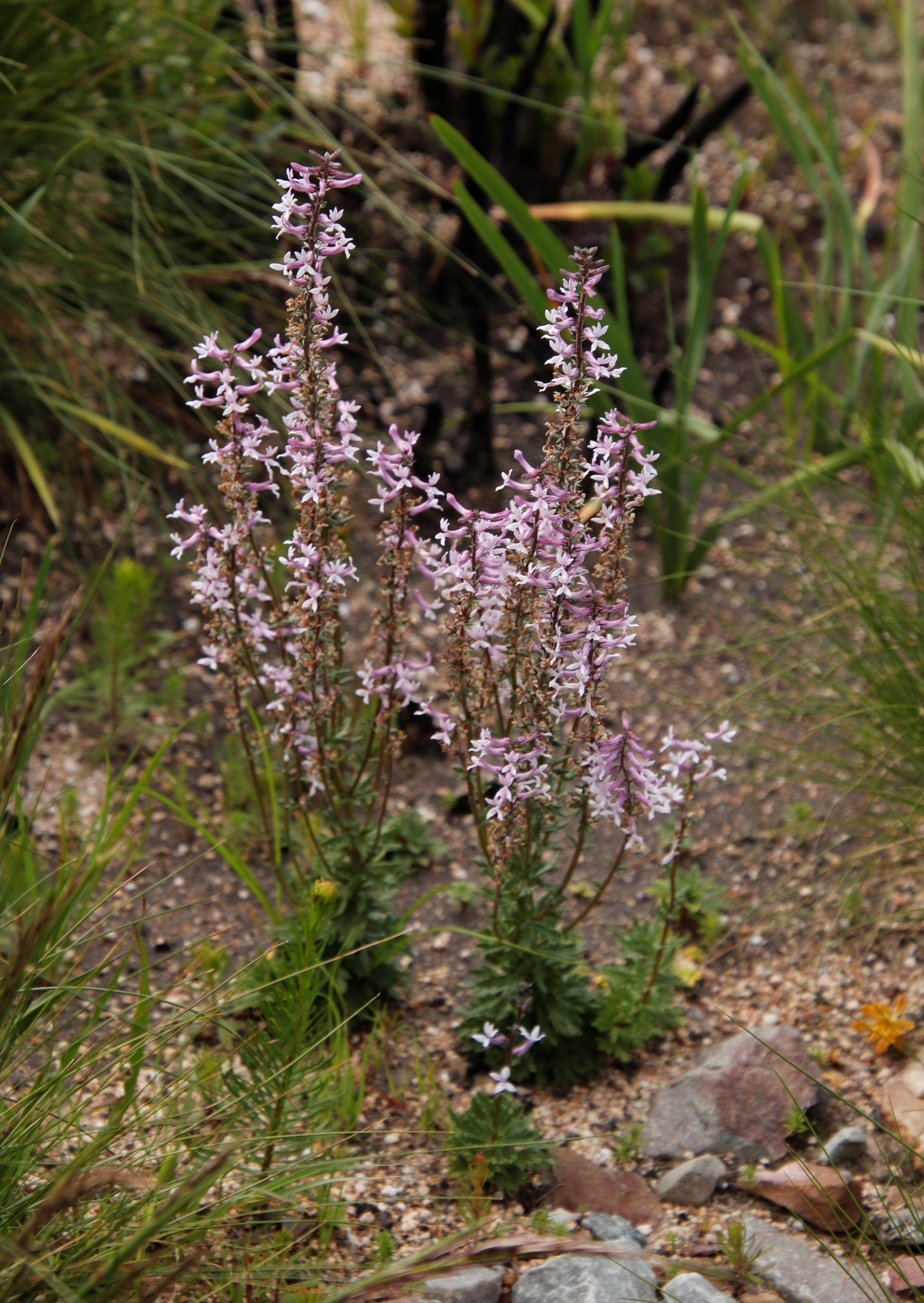
Cyphia bulbosa plants

This geophyte grows to be up to 12–30 cm (4.7–11.8 in) tall. The leaves are mostly basal and grade into bracts up the stem. The deeply dissected leaves have a palmatisect or palmatifid shape and are paler on the underside.

Flowers are present between August and November. They range from white to mauve in colour and are borne in racemes. Each flower is 8–13 mm (0.31–0.51 in) long and is surrounded by a toothed or lobed bract. As with other species in the genus, the style has a fluid filled stigmatic cavity rather than free stigma. It has two bearded anthers on the 6 mm (0.24 in) long stamens. The triangular calyx lobes have round interspaces.

The fat, oval-shaped seeds have narrow wings.

== Distribution and habitat ==
This species is endemic to South Africa. It is found on sandy and stony flats and slopes between the Cedarberg Mountains and the Cape Peninsula. It is common in Cape Town.
