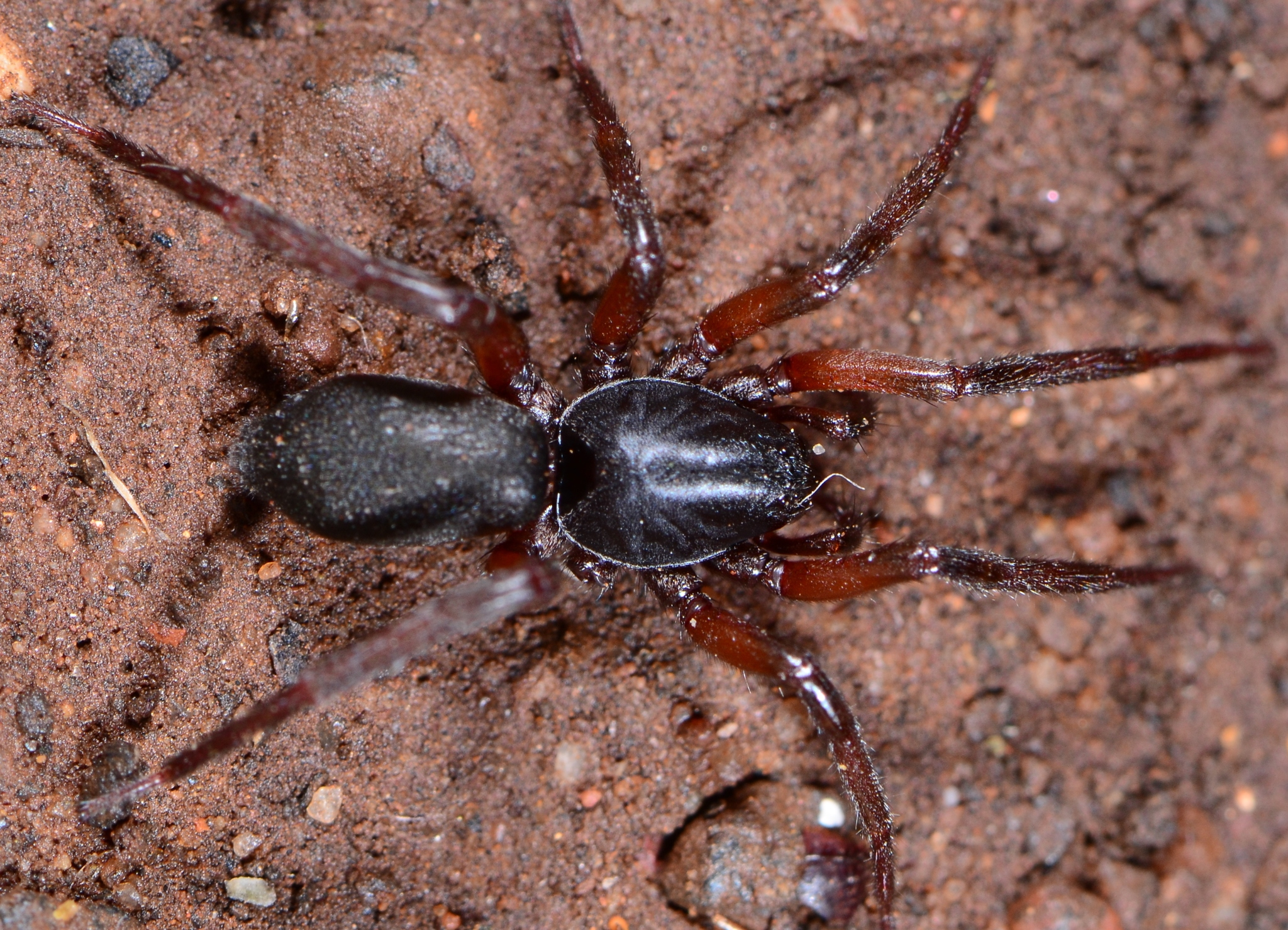
- Female R. exilis
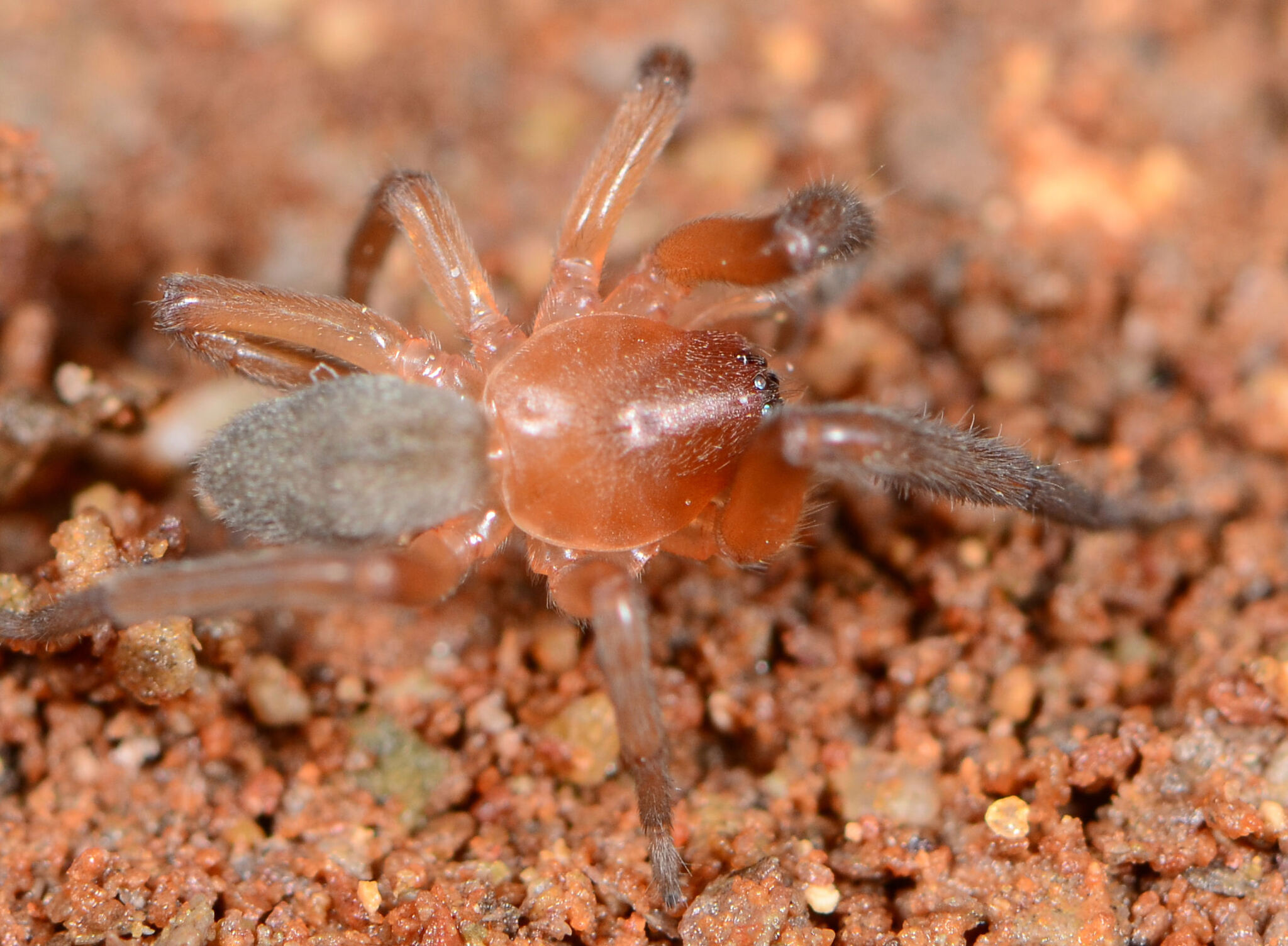
- Female R. secunda

Scientific classification
- Kingdom: Animalia
- Phylum: Arthropoda
- Subphylum: Chelicerata
- Class: Arachnida
- Order: Araneae
- Infraorder: Araneomorphae
- Family: Liocranidae
- Genus: Rhaeboctesis; Simon

Type species
- Rhaeboctesis equestris

Species
- 8, see text

= Rhaeboctesis =

Genus of spiders

Rhaeboctesis is a genus of spiders in the family Liocranidae. It was first described in 1897 by Simon. Of the eight described species, all but one are found in southern Africa. R. xizangensis is endemic to China.

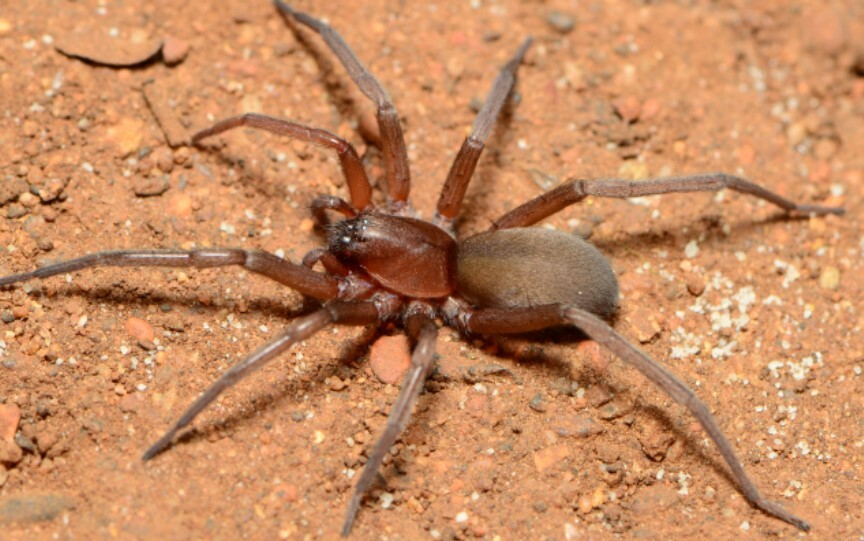
female R. transvaalensis

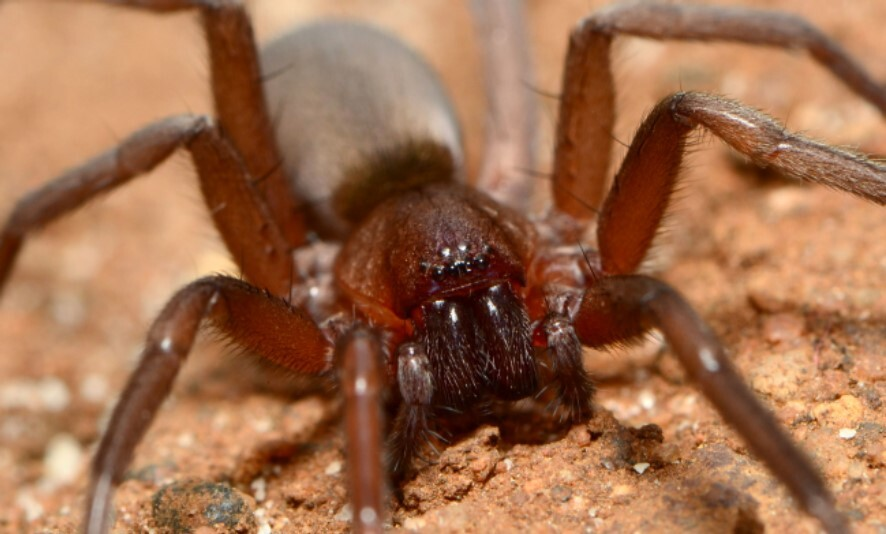
female R. transvaalensis

== Species ==
As of October 2025, this genus includes eight species:

- Rhaeboctesis denotata Lawrence, 1928 – Angola, Namibia, Botswana, South Africa
- Rhaeboctesis equestris Simon, 1897 – South Africa (type species)
- Rhaeboctesis exilis Tucker, 1920 – South Africa
- Rhaeboctesis matroosbergensis Tucker, 1920 – South Africa
- Rhaeboctesis secunda Tucker, 1920 – South Africa
- Rhaeboctesis transvaalensis Tucker, 1920 – South Africa
- Rhaeboctesis trinotata Tucker, 1920 – Zimbabwe, South Africa
- Rhaeboctesis xizangensis (Hu, 2001) – China
