= Rhaeboctesis denotata =

Namibia Rhaeboctesis Sac Spider

Conservation status
- Least Concern (SANBI Red List)

Scientific classification
- Kingdom: Animalia
- Phylum: Arthropoda
- Subphylum: Chelicerata
- Class: Arachnida
- Order: Araneae
- Infraorder: Araneomorphae
- Family: Liocranidae
- Genus: Rhaeboctesis
- Species: R. denotata

Binomial name
- Rhaeboctesis denotata Lawrence, 1928

Species of spider

Rhaeboctesis denotata is a species of spider in the family Miturgidae. It occurs in southern Africa and is commonly known as the Namibia Rhaeboctesis sac spider.

== Distribution ==
Rhaeboctesis denotata is found in Angola, Namibia, Botswana, and South Africa. In South Africa, it is known only from the Northern Cape province, specifically from Prieska (Green Valley Nuts Estate).

== Habitat and ecology ==
The species inhabits Nama Karoo biomes at an altitude of 950 m above sea level. These free-running ground spiders have also been sampled from pistachio orchards. They are rare and little is known about their behaviour.

== Description ==
Rhaeboctesis denotata is known only from females.

== Conservation ==
Rhaeboctesis denotata is listed as Least Concern due to its wide range across southern Africa. However, the species is possibly still under-sampled in South Africa, and threats to this species are not considered significant.

== Taxonomy ==
The species was originally described by Reginald Frederick Lawrence in 1928 from Namibia. It remains unrevised.
