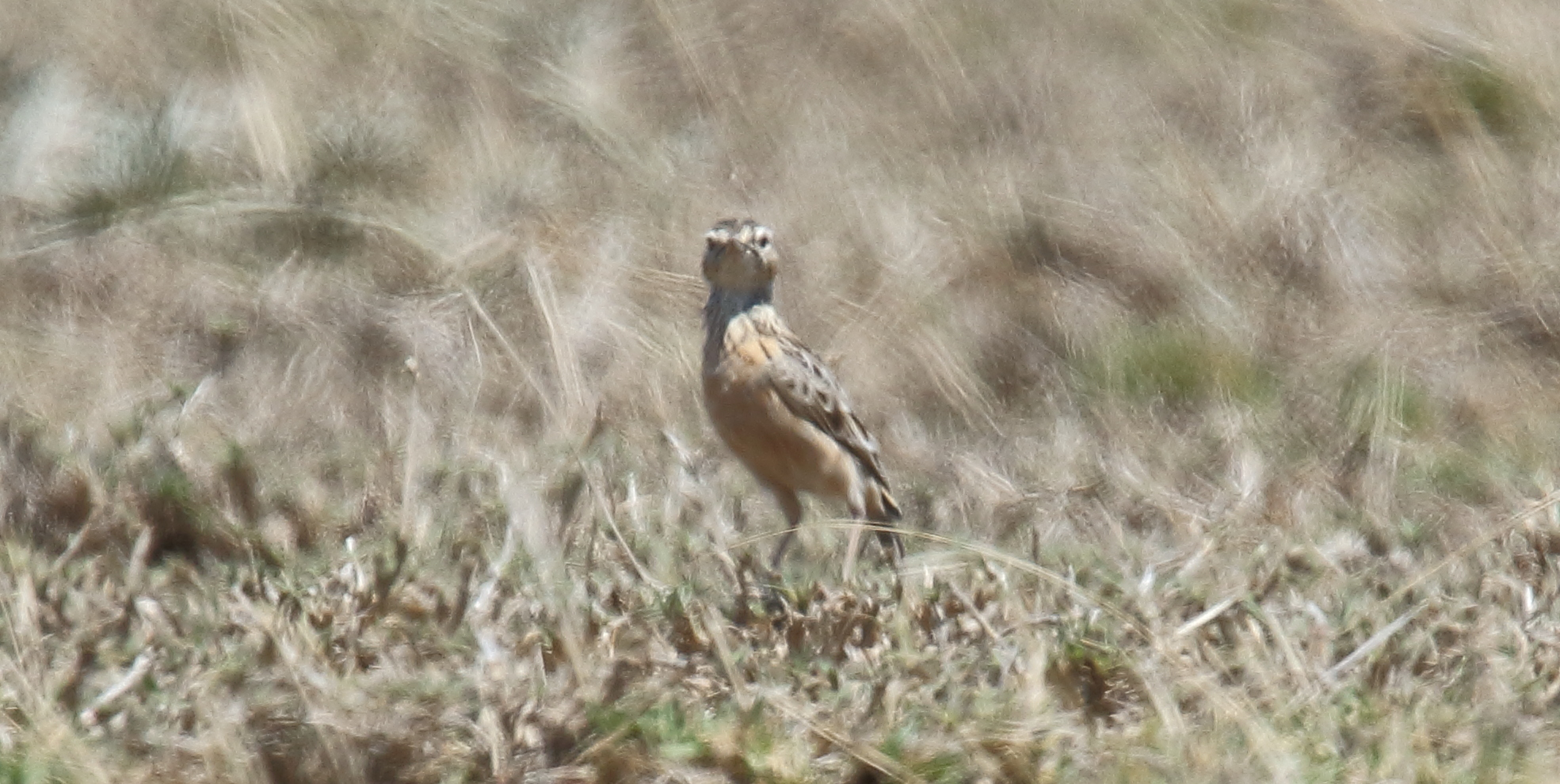

Scientific classification
- Kingdom: Animalia
- Phylum: Chordata
- Class: Aves
- Order: Passeriformes
- Family: Alaudidae
- Genus: Chersomanes
- Species: C. beesleyi

Binomial name
- Chersomanes beesleyi Benson, 1966
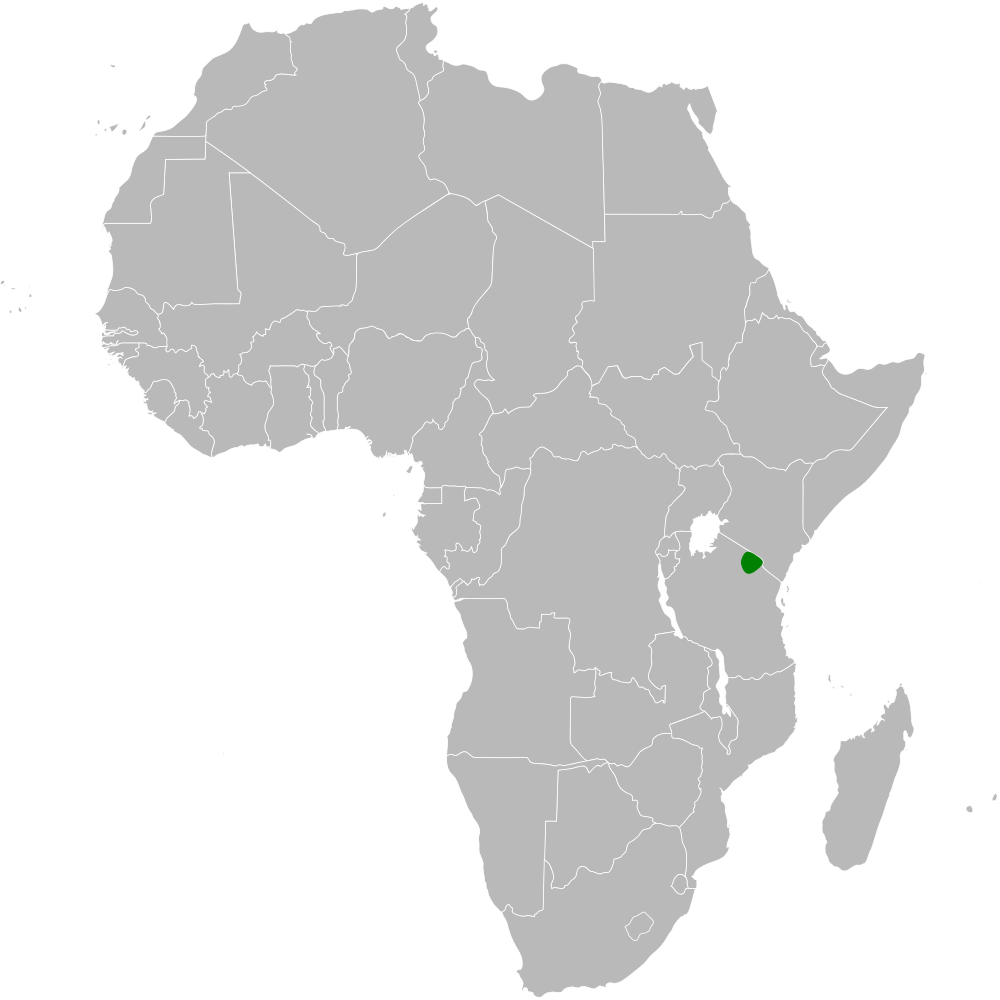
- resident range

Synonyms
- Chersomanes albofasciata beesleyi (formerly)

= Beesley's lark =

Species of bird

Beesley's Lark (Chersomanes beesleyi) is a species of lark in the family Alaudidae. It was formerly considered to be a subspecies of the Spike-heeled Lark.

The Beesley's Lark is found in Northern Tanzania, in some very restricted patches of Afrotropical grassland, mainly composed of Sporobolus ioclados and Digitaria macroblephara on volcanic soil. This species has adapted to arid areas with no tree coverage, thus evolving a specific cryptic plumage. Chersomanes beesleyi is a granivorous bird, meaning it feeds on seeds, but individuals are habitually seen feeding on insects too, like beetles, caterpillars and centipedes, occasionally preying on small reptiles as well.

== Taxonomy/ Classification ==
Beesley’s Lark is a bird of the lark family Alaudidae, a group of ground dwelling perching birds. It was previously considered a subspecies of the Spike-heeled Lark (Chersomanes albofasciata), before being classified as a true species, having in fact differentiated from C. albofasciata 3-5MYA, with remarkable mDNA divergence from all subspecies of the Spike-heeled Lark.

== Description ==
Beesley’s Larks show some slender, decurved bills, and can be identified by their whitish napes, general structure and size, but also by their vocalizations and behavior. They have some white-fringed, scalloped upperwing coverts, and a very short tail, sporting some white-tipped rectrices and a rufuous rump. The species is sexually dimorphic, and individuals of different sexes can be told apart in the field: adult female Beesley’s Larks have bolder breast streaks in comparison to males, a darker-orange belly, and they are smaller in size. In adults, in which the males are also more heavily-billed, the upperparts show blackish-brown coloration if fresh, and they turn pale gray once heavily abraded. In fresh plumage, the males also tend to display a supercilium much thicker than the females'. They breed during the long and short rains; which range between the months of October through December, and from March through April. Their nesting sites are on the ground, and they are built like a small cup. The birds line each nest with dry grass and also cow dung, and two to three eggs are laid therein.

== Behaviors ==
The Beesley’s Larks reside in Northern Tanzania year-round with no migrations. Very sociable, they associate in groups of 3-6 (singletons are moderately rare, especially during the breeding season) and their calls consist of a quivering trill “Trrrri-trrri-trrri-trrriii”, quite resemblant of some shorebirds' in-flight alarm calls. When vocalizing together, males and females have the same interaction vocabulary, contact and alarm calls. They are unresponsive to any recorded calls of C. albofasciata, no matter the race, with agitation as the only outcome. Beesley’s Larks have the tendency of running through their habitat, and if strictly necessary, they can perform some low, bobbing, flappy flights, usually travelling short distances, only for suddenly dropping to the ground and hiding behind grass tussocks. They usually soar higher for intraspecific interactions or for territorial defense only; Beesley's Larks are highly unlikely to attack their kin, but they can be very efficiently aggressive against other species, as the Capped and the Isabelline Wheaters, or other larks, as the locally common Red-capped Lark.

== Conservation Status ==
The Beesley’s Lark population is small, and highly threatened. However, as of October 2024, renewed surveys were performed in Northern Tanzania, which may have found some minor colonies outside of the main core area for the species, whose estimated population is nevertheless of fewer than 70 individuals left, in total. In its main site, namely some pastoralized, semi-desertified land 45km north of Arusha, the species is critically threatened by overgrazing and climate change; egg and nestling survival is very low, mainly due to intense cattle trampling. Some Maasai villagers, living in the nearby communities, have long tried to conserve this species, and are constantly achieving small successes, at least temporarily saving it from extinction. No national or international authority has ever shown any interest into preserving Beesley's Lark, despite its extremely concerning status.
