= Cyphia digitata =

Conservation status
- Least Concern (SANBI Red List)

Scientific classification
- Kingdom: Plantae
- Clade: Tracheophytes
- Clade: Angiosperms
- Clade: Eudicots
- Clade: Asterids
- Order: Asterales
- Family: Campanulaceae
- Genus: Cyphia
- Species: C. digitata

Binomial name
- Cyphia digitata (Thunb.) Willd.

Species of climbing Fynbos plant

Cyphia digitata is a species of flowering plant in the genus Cyphia, endemic to the Western Cape.

== Description ==
Cyphia digitata is a twining climber, with an underground tuber.

The leaves along the stems are sessile or near-sessile, digitate (divided into 3-7 lobes) with segments that are linear(-lanceolate) and often slightly denticulate. Higher up on the stems the leaves transition into leaf-like 3-5 lobed bracts. At the base of the stems, against the ground, there are sometimes much broader leaves.

The flower shape is bilabiate, with the corolla tube divided entirely into two (three petals curved upwards, two down). The stamens are relatively long for the genus, 5-9mm. The flower colour is white or a light purple-cream. There are usually some purple spots on the inside of the petals.

It is closely related to, and often confused with, other southern Cape species such as Cyphia volubilis and Cyphia sylvatica.
