= Cyphia sylvatica =

Conservation status
- Least Concern (SANBI Red List)

Scientific classification
- Kingdom: Plantae
- Clade: Tracheophytes
- Clade: Angiosperms
- Clade: Eudicots
- Clade: Asterids
- Order: Asterales
- Family: Campanulaceae
- Genus: Cyphia
- Species: C. sylvatica

Binomial name
- Cyphia sylvatica Eckl. & Zeyh.

Species of climbing Fynbos plant

Cyphia sylvatica is a species of flowering plant in the genus Cyphia, endemic to the Western Cape.

== Description ==
Cyphia sylvatica is a twining climber, with an underground tuber.

The leaves have a short (2-6 mm) petiole and sometimes appear almost sessile. The leaves are entire (not divided), with a linear to elongated lanceolate shape. The leaf-tips are acute. The leaf bases gradually narrow into the short petiole. The leaf margins are often denticulate (rarely with two tiny spur-like lobes at the base). At the base of the stems, near the ground, there are sometimes much broader leaves.

The flower shape is bilabiate, with the corolla tube divided entirely into two (three petals curved upwards, two down). The stamens are 6-7mm long. The flower colour is white to a pale purple/mauve.

It is closely related to, and often confused with, other southern Cape species such as Cyphia volubilis and Cyphia digitata.
