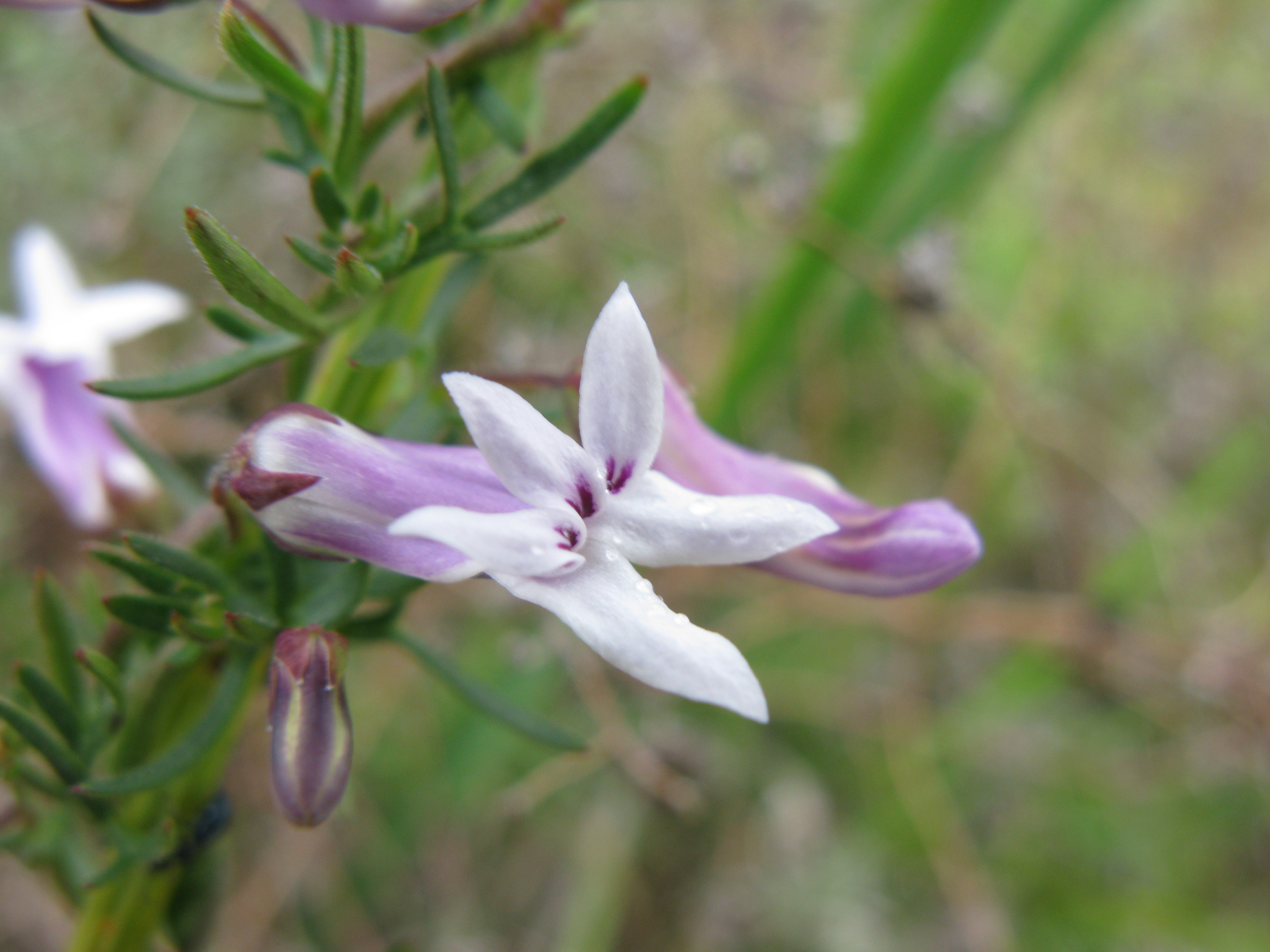
- Cyphia digitata

Scientific classification
- Kingdom: Plantae
- Clade: Tracheophytes
- Clade: Angiosperms
- Clade: Eudicots
- Clade: Asterids
- Order: Asterales
- Family: Campanulaceae
- Subfamily: Cyphioideae
- Genus: Cyphia; P.J.Bergius

Type species
- Cyphia bulbosa (L.) Bergam.

Synonyms
- Cyphopsis Kuntze; Cyphium J.F.Gmel., spelling variation; Cyphiella (C.Presl) Spach

= Cyphia =

Genus of flowering plants

Cyphia is a genus of flowering plants in the bellflower family, native to Africa; and particularly South Africa. It has been placed in its own subfamily, Cyphioideae. It is closely related to the genus Lobelia. Cyphia comes in shades of white to mauve, whereas lobelias have strong colours of blue to purple. Species in this genus have a bilabiate corolla; with 3 lobes on top and 2 below (as opposed to Lobelia, which has 2 lobes on top and 3 below).

Accepted species:

- Cyphia alba N.E.Br. – Zimbabwe
- Cyphia alicedalensis E.Wimm. in H.G.A.Engler – South Africa
- Cyphia angustifolia Eckl. & Zeyh. ex C.Presl in C.F.Eklon & K.L.P.Zeyher – South Africa
- Cyphia aspergilloides E.Wimm. – South Africa
- Cyphia basiloba E.Wimm. in H.G.A.Engler – South Africa
- Cyphia belfastica E.Wimm. in H.G.A.Engler – South Africa
- Cyphia bolusii E.Phillips – Eswatini
- Cyphia brachyandra Thulin – Tanzania, Malawi
- Cyphia brevifolia Thulin – Angola
- Cyphia brummittii Thulin – Malawi
- Cyphia bulbosa (L.) P.J.Bergius – South Africa
- Cyphia comptonii Bond – South Africa
- Cyphia corylifolia Harv. – KwaZulu-Natal
- Cyphia couroublei Bamps & Malaisse – Congo
- Cyphia crenata (Thunb.) C.Presl – South Africa
- Cyphia decora Thulin – Malawi
- Cyphia deltoidea E.Wimm. in H.G.A.Engler – KwaZulu-Natal
- Cyphia digitata (Thunb.) Willd. – Namibia, South Africa
- Cyphia elata Harv – South Africa, Lesotho, Eswatini
- Cyphia erecta De Wild. – Tanzania, Zambia, Congo, Malawi
- Cyphia eritreana E.Wimm. in H.G.A.Engler – Eritrea, Ethiopia
- Cyphia galpinii E.Wimm. in H.G.A.Engler – South Africa
- Cyphia gamopetala J.Duvign. & Denaeyer – Congo
- Cyphia georgica E.Wimm. in H.G.A.Engler – South Africa
- Cyphia glabra E.Wimm. – South Africa
- Cyphia glandulifera Hochst. ex A.Rich. – Eritrea, Ethiopia, Somalia, Kenya, Tanzania, Uganda, Malawi
- Cyphia heterophylla C.Presl in C.F.Eklon & K.L.P.Zeyher – South Africa
- Cyphia incisa (Thunb.) Willd. – South Africa
- Cyphia lasiandra Diels – Congo, Burundi, Tanzania, Angola, Malawi, Mozambique
- Cyphia linarioides C.Presl in C.F.Eklon & K.L.P.Zeyher – South Africa
- Cyphia longiflora Schltr. – South Africa
- Cyphia longifolia N.E.Br. – South Africa
- Cyphia longilobata E.Phillips – South Africa
- Cyphia longipedicellata E.Wimm. – South Africa
- Cyphia maculosa E.Phillips – South Africa
- Cyphia mafingensis Thulin – Malawi
- Cyphia mazoensis S.Moore – Malawi, Mozambique, Zambia, Zimbabwe
- Cyphia natalensis E.Phillips – KwaZulu-Natal
- Cyphia nyikensis Thulin – Malawi
- Cyphia oligotricha Schltr. – South Africa
- Cyphia pectinata E.Wimm. in H.G.A.Engler – Eswatini
- Cyphia persicifolia C.Presl in E.H.F.Meyer – South Africa
- Cyphia phillipsii E.Wimm. in H.G.A.Engler – South Africa
- Cyphia phyteuma (L.) Willd. – South Africa
- Cyphia ramosa E.Wimm. in H.G.A.Engler – Free State
- Cyphia reducta E.Wimm. – Zimbabwe, Mozambique
- Cyphia revoluta E.Wimm. in H.G.A.Engler – South Africa
- Cyphia richardsiae E.Wimm. in H.G.A.Engler – Tanzania, Congo, Malawi
- Cyphia rogersii S.Moore – Eswatini, South Africa
- Cyphia rupestris E.Wimm. in H.G.A.Engler – Tanzania
- Cyphia salteri E.Wimm. in H.G.A.Engler – South Africa
- Cyphia schlechteri E.Phillips – South Africa
- Cyphia smutsii E.Wimm. in H.G.A.Engler – South Africa
- Cyphia stenodonta E.Wimm. in H.G.A.Engler – South Africa
- Cyphia stenopetala Diels – South Africa, Botswana
- Cyphia stenophylla (E.Wimm.) E.Wimm. in H.G.A.Engler – South Africa
- Cyphia stheno Webb in W.J.Hooker – Angola
- Cyphia subtubulata E.Wimm. in H.G.A.Engler – South Africa
- Cyphia sylvatica Eckl. & Zeyh. – South Africa, Namibia
- Cyphia tenera Diels – South Africa
- Cyphia transvaalensis E.Phillips – South Africa
- Cyphia triphylla E.Phillips – Lesotho, South Africa
- Cyphia tysonii E.Phillips – South Africa
- Cyphia ubenensis Engl. – Tanzania
- Cyphia undulata Eckl. ex C.Presl in C.F.Eklon & K.L.P.Zeyher – South Africa
- Cyphia volubilis (Burm.f.) Willd. – South Africa
- Cyphia zeyheriana C.Presl in C.F.Eklon & K.L.P.Zeyher – South Africa
