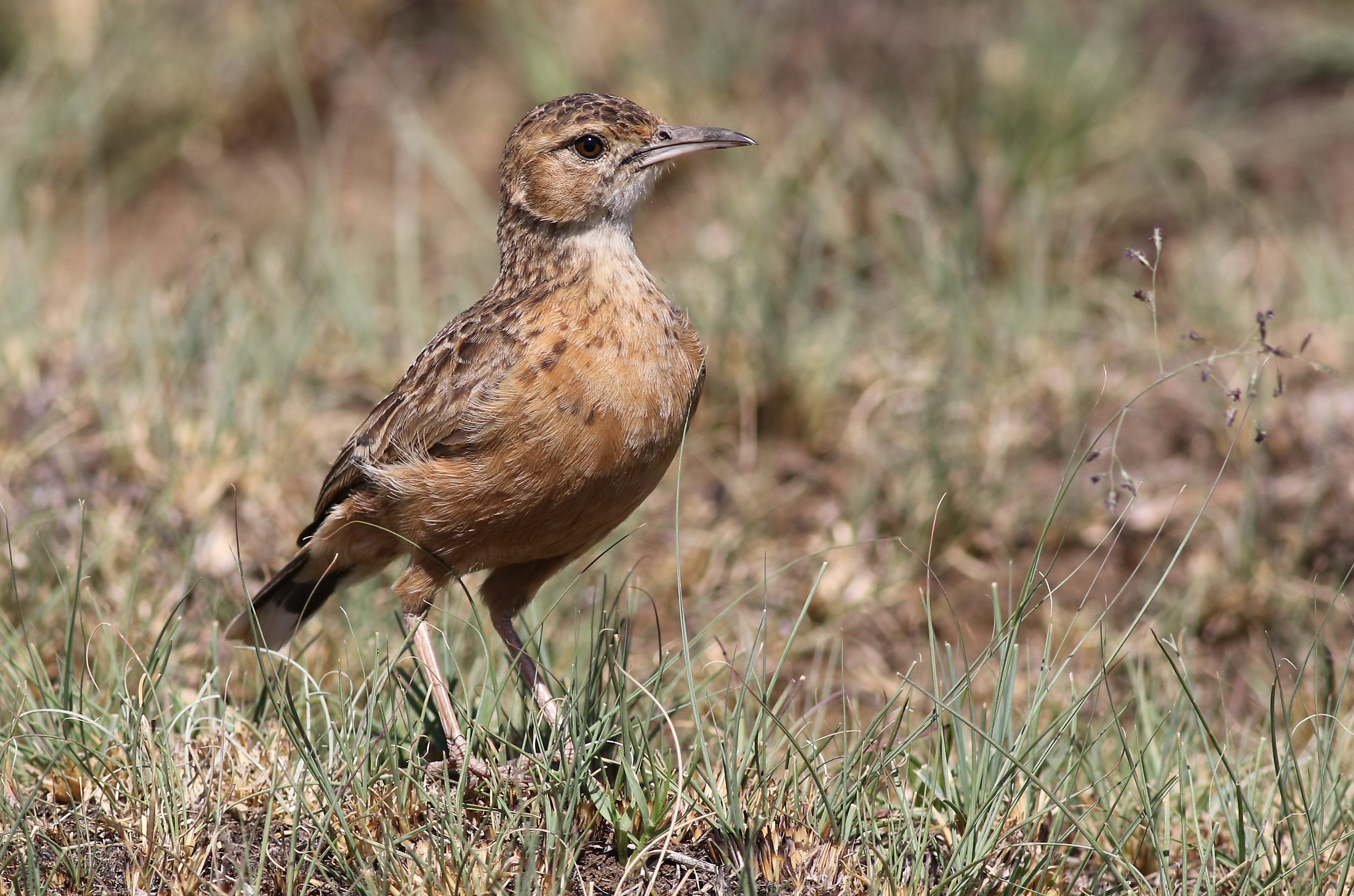

Conservation status
- Least Concern (IUCN 3.1)

Scientific classification
- Kingdom: Animalia
- Phylum: Chordata
- Class: Aves
- Order: Passeriformes
- Family: Alaudidae
- Genus: Chersomanes
- Species: C. albofasciata

Binomial name
- Chersomanes albofasciata (Lafresnaye, 1836)

Subspecies
- See text
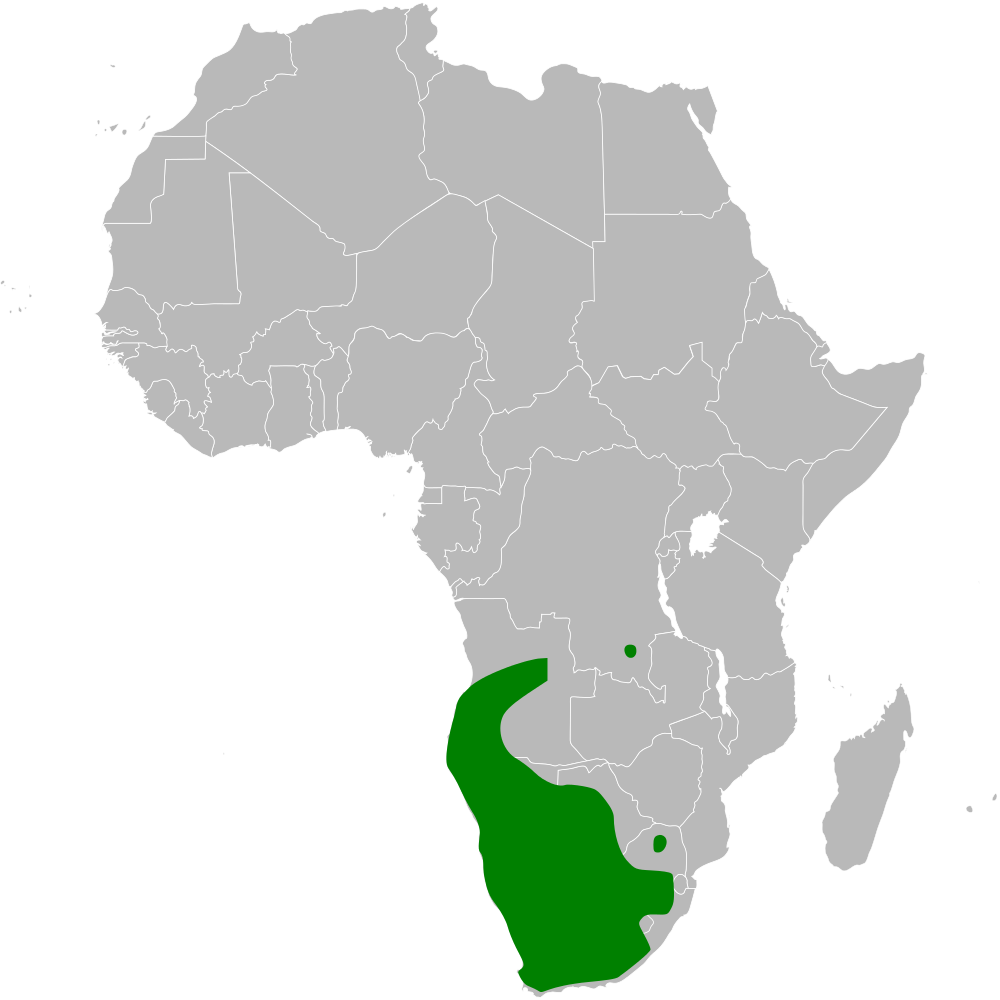
- resident range

Synonyms
- Certhilauda albofasciata; Chersomanes garrula; Chersomanes rufulus

= Spike-heeled lark =

Species of bird

The spike-heeled lark (Chersomanes albofasciata) is a species of lark in the family Alaudidae. It is found in southern Africa.

Its natural habitats are subtropical or tropical dry shrubland and subtropical or tropical seasonally wet or flooded lowland grassland.

== Taxonomy and systematics ==
Originally, the spike-heeled lark was considered to belong to the genus Certhilauda (as C. albofasciata). Alternately, it has been called the rufous long-billed lark.

=== Subspecies ===
Presently, ten subspecies are recognized. Additionally, Beesley's lark was also formerly classified as a subspecies of the spike-heeled lark.

- Benguella rufous long-billed lark (C. a. obscurata) - Hartert, 1907: Found in south-western and central Angola
- Ovampo rufous long-billed lark (C. a. erikssoni) - (Hartert, 1907): Found in northern Namibia
- C. a. kalahariae - (Ogilvie-Grant, 1912): Originally described as a separate species in the genus Certhilauda. Found in southern and western Botswana, northern South Africa
- C. a. boweni - (Meyer de Schauensee, 1931): Found in north-western Namibia
- Damara rufous long-billed lark (C. a. arenaria) - (Reichenow, 1904): Found in southern Namibia and south-western South Africa
- C. a. barlowi - White, CMN, 1961: Found in eastern Botswana
- C. a. alticola - Roberts, 1932: Found in north-eastern South Africa
- Rufous long-billed lark (C. a. albofasciata) - (Lafresnaye, 1836): Found in south-eastern Botswana to central South Africa
- C. a. garrula - (Smith, A, 1846): Originally described as a separate species in the genus Certhilauda. Found in western South Africa
- C. a. macdonaldi - (Winterbottom, 1958): Found in southern South Africa

== Gallery ==
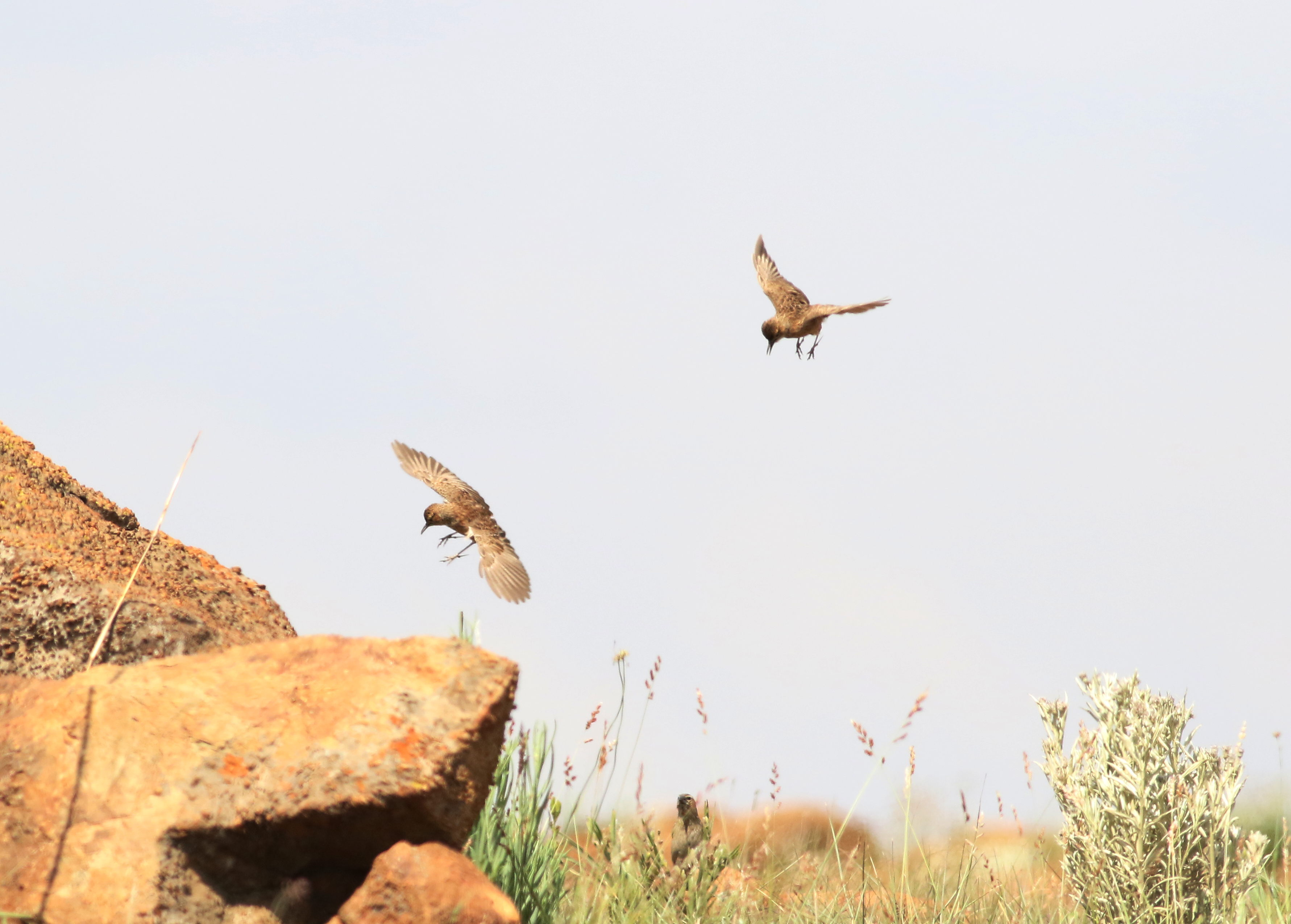
A pair in flight

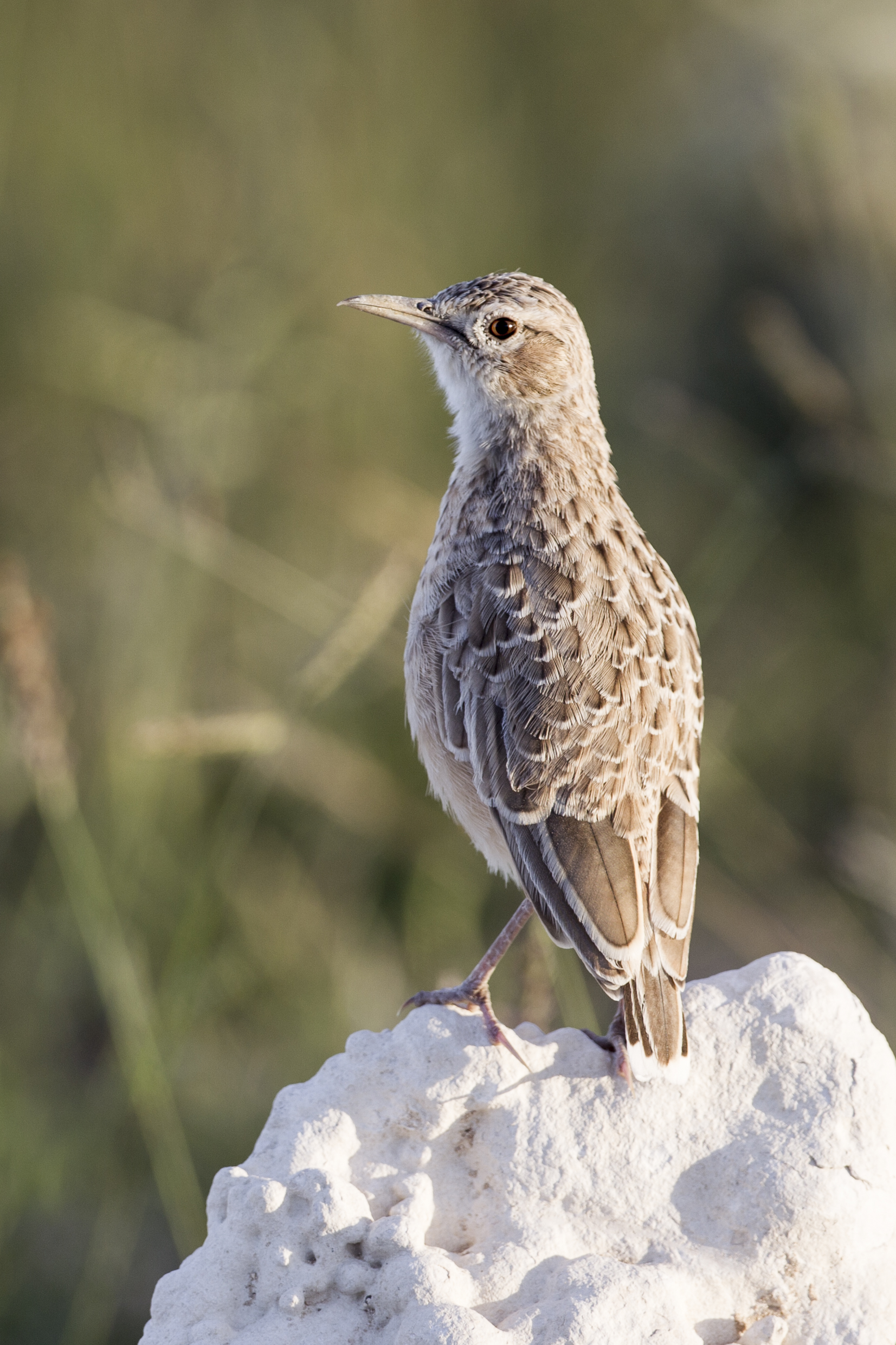
C. a. erikssoni in Etosha National Park

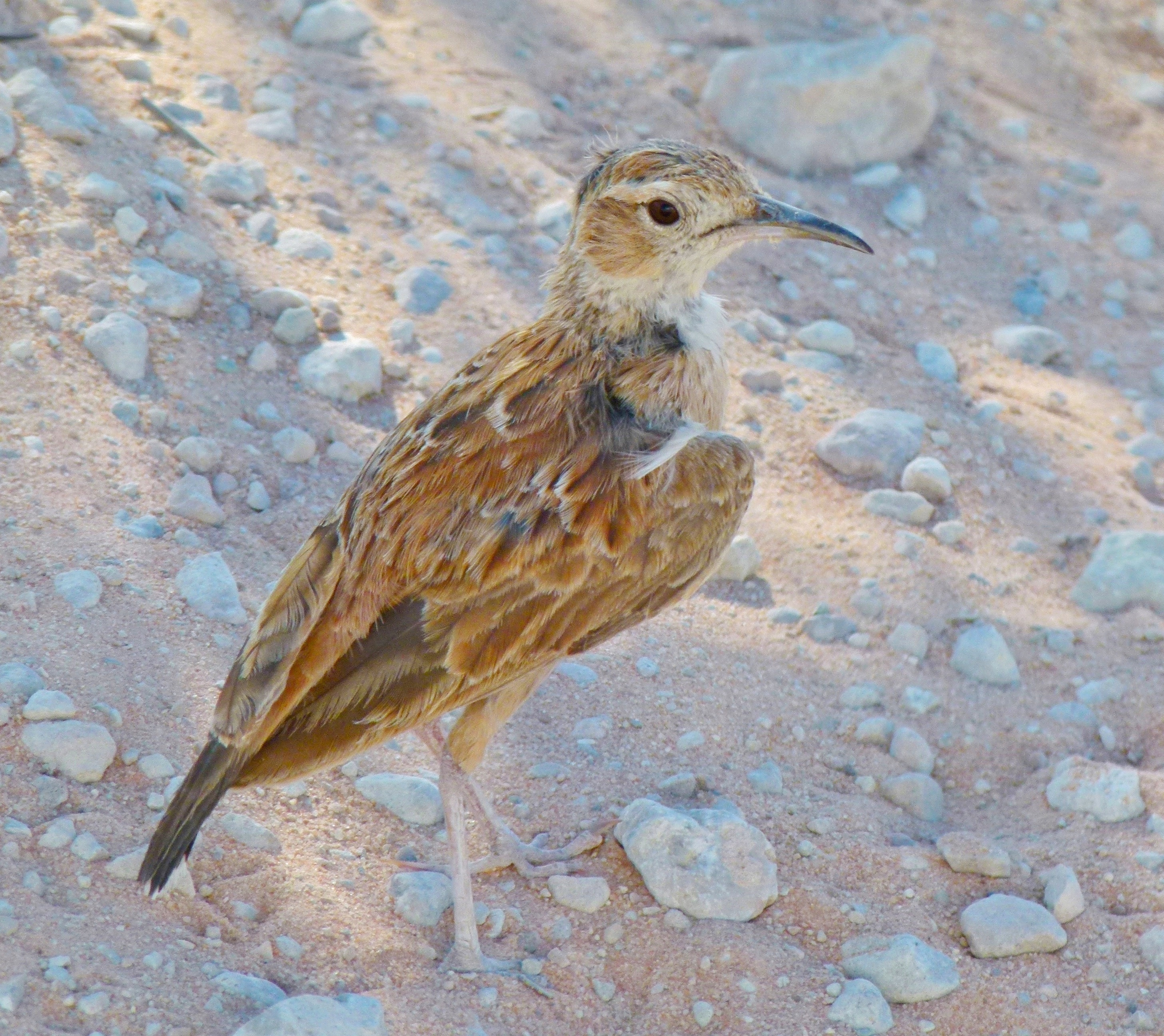
C. a. kalahariae in the Kgalagadi T. F. Park
