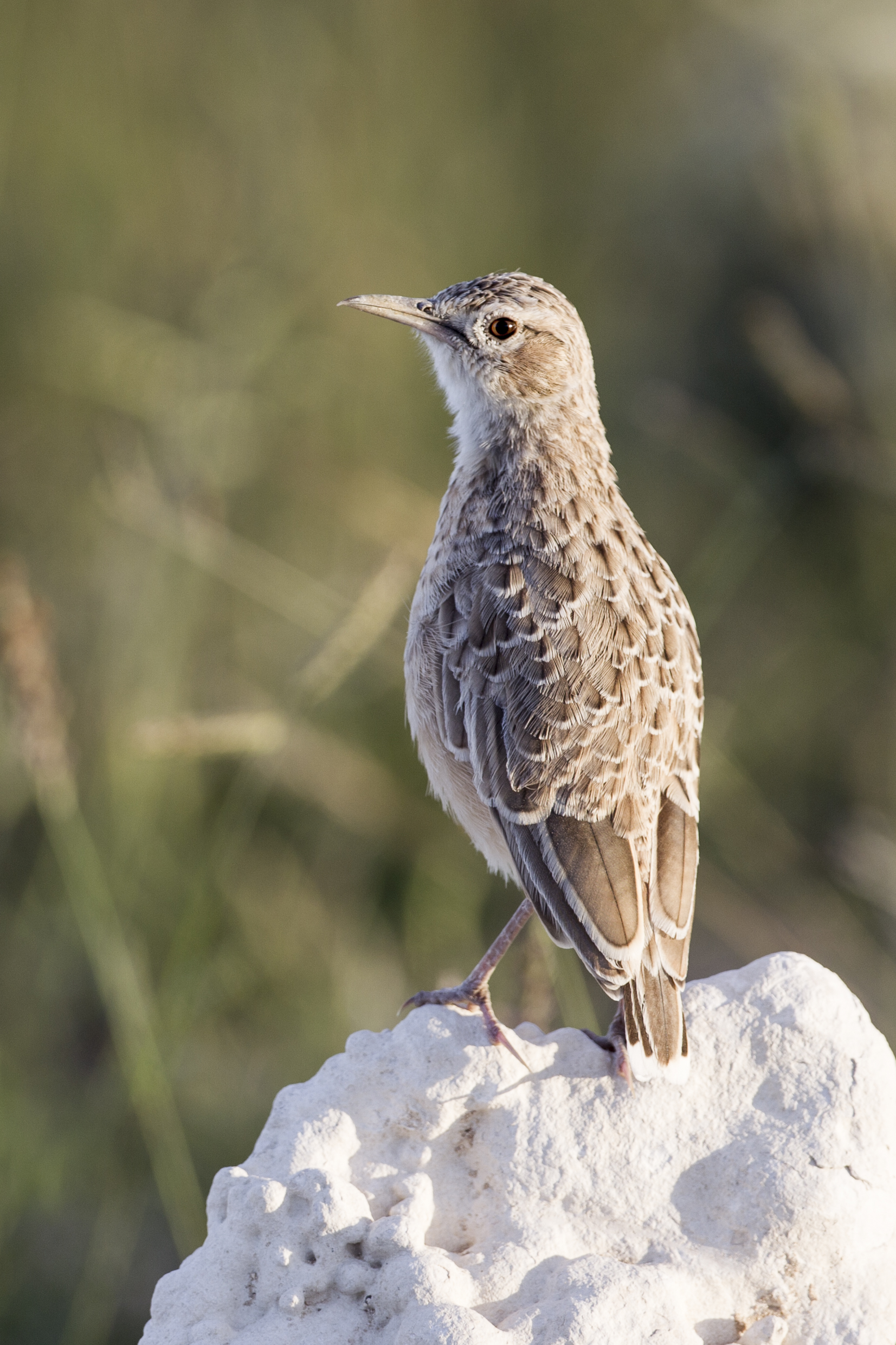
- Spike-heeled lark (Chersomanes albofasciata)

Scientific classification
- Kingdom: Animalia
- Phylum: Chordata
- Class: Aves
- Order: Passeriformes
- Family: Alaudidae
- Genus: Chersomanes; Cabanis, 1851

Type species
- Certhilauda garrula A. Smith, 1846

Species
- 2, see text
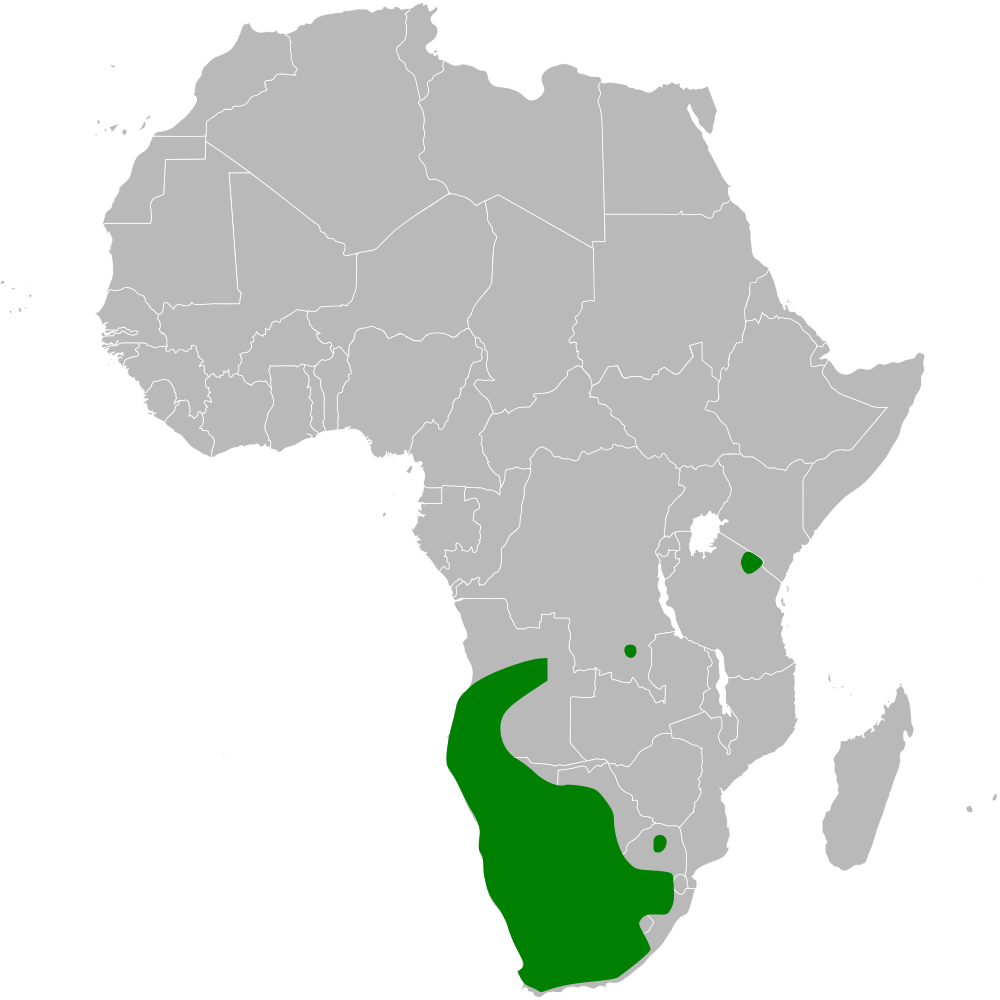
- range of genus

= Chersomanes =

Genus of birds

Chersomanes is a genus of larks in the family Alaudidae found in southern and southeastern Africa.

It contains the two species:

| Image | Scientific name | Common name | Distribution |
|---|---|---|---|
| | Chersomanes beesleyi | Beesley's lark | northeastern Tanzania |
| | Chersomanes albofasciata | Spike-heeled lark | southern Africa |
