= Rhaeboctesis trinotata =

Zimbabwe Rhaeboctesis Sac Spider

Conservation status
- Least Concern (SANBI Red List)

Scientific classification
- Kingdom: Animalia
- Phylum: Arthropoda
- Subphylum: Chelicerata
- Class: Arachnida
- Order: Araneae
- Infraorder: Araneomorphae
- Family: Liocranidae
- Genus: Rhaeboctesis
- Species: R. trinotata

Binomial name
- Rhaeboctesis trinotata Tucker, 1920

Species of spider

Rhaeboctesis trinotata is a species of ground dwelling spider in the family Liocranidae. It occurs in southern Africa and is commonly known as the Zimbabwe Rhaeboctesis sac spider.

== Distribution ==
Rhaeboctesis trinotata is found in Zimbabwe and South Africa. In South Africa, it has been recorded from six provinces: Free State, KwaZulu-Natal, Limpopo, Mpumalanga, North West, and Northern Cape. The species has a wide distribution across various protected areas including multiple locations in Kruger National Park.

== Habitat and ecology ==
The species inhabits Grassland, Nama Karoo, and Savanna biomes at altitudes ranging from 140 to 1,909 m above sea level. These free-running ground spiders have been found to survive in agroecosystems and have been sampled from pistachio orchards.

== Description ==
This species is usually light brown to dark brown carapace. It has three patches on its abdomen arranged dorsally.

Rhaeboctesis trinotata is known only from females.

== Conservation ==
Rhaeboctesis trinotata is listed as Least Concern due to its wide geographical range. The species is able to survive in agroecosystems and is protected in five protected areas. Threats to this species are not considered significant.

== Taxonomy ==
The species was originally described by Tucker in 1920 from Zimbabwe. The genus remains unrevised.
