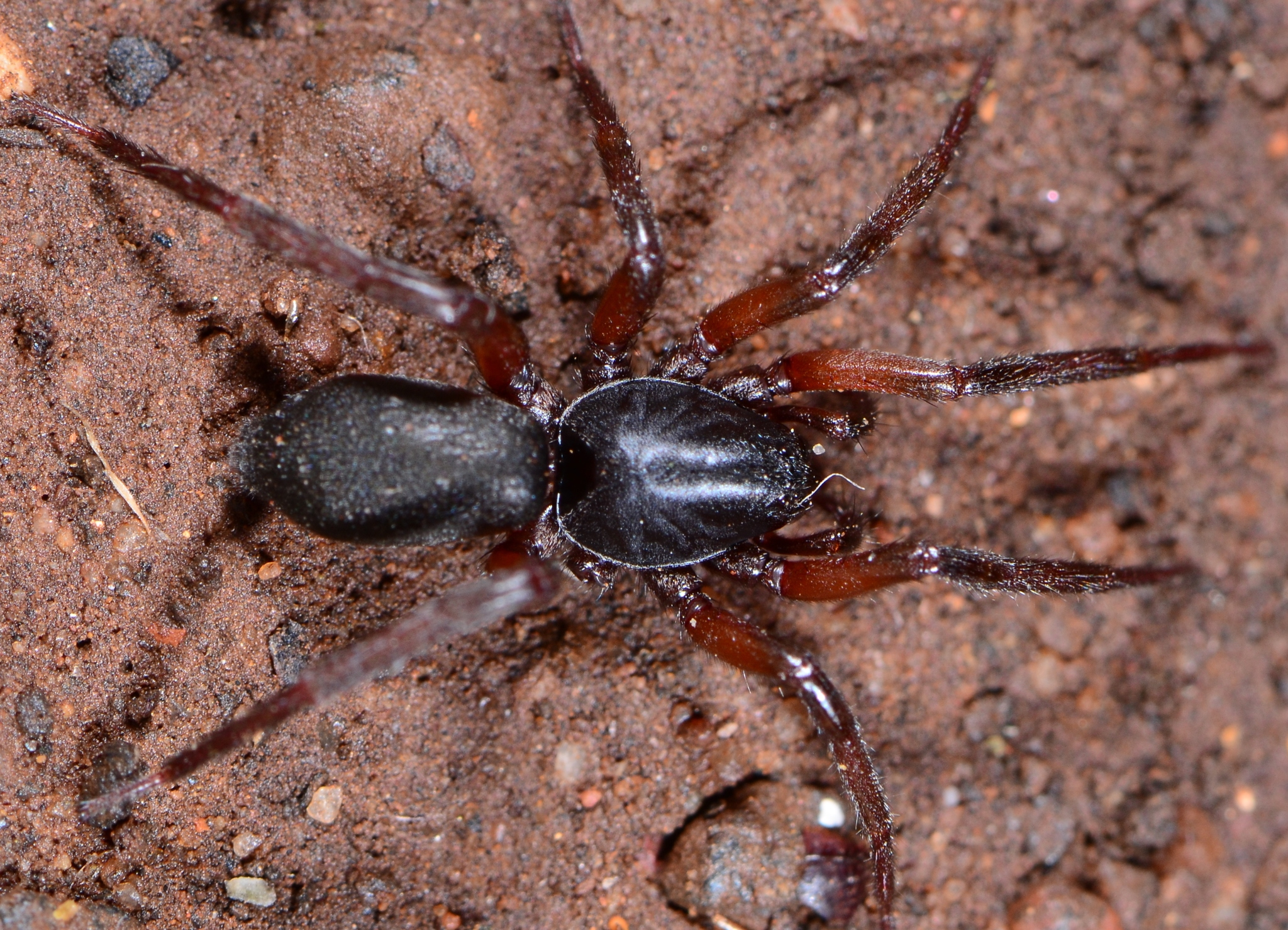
- Female
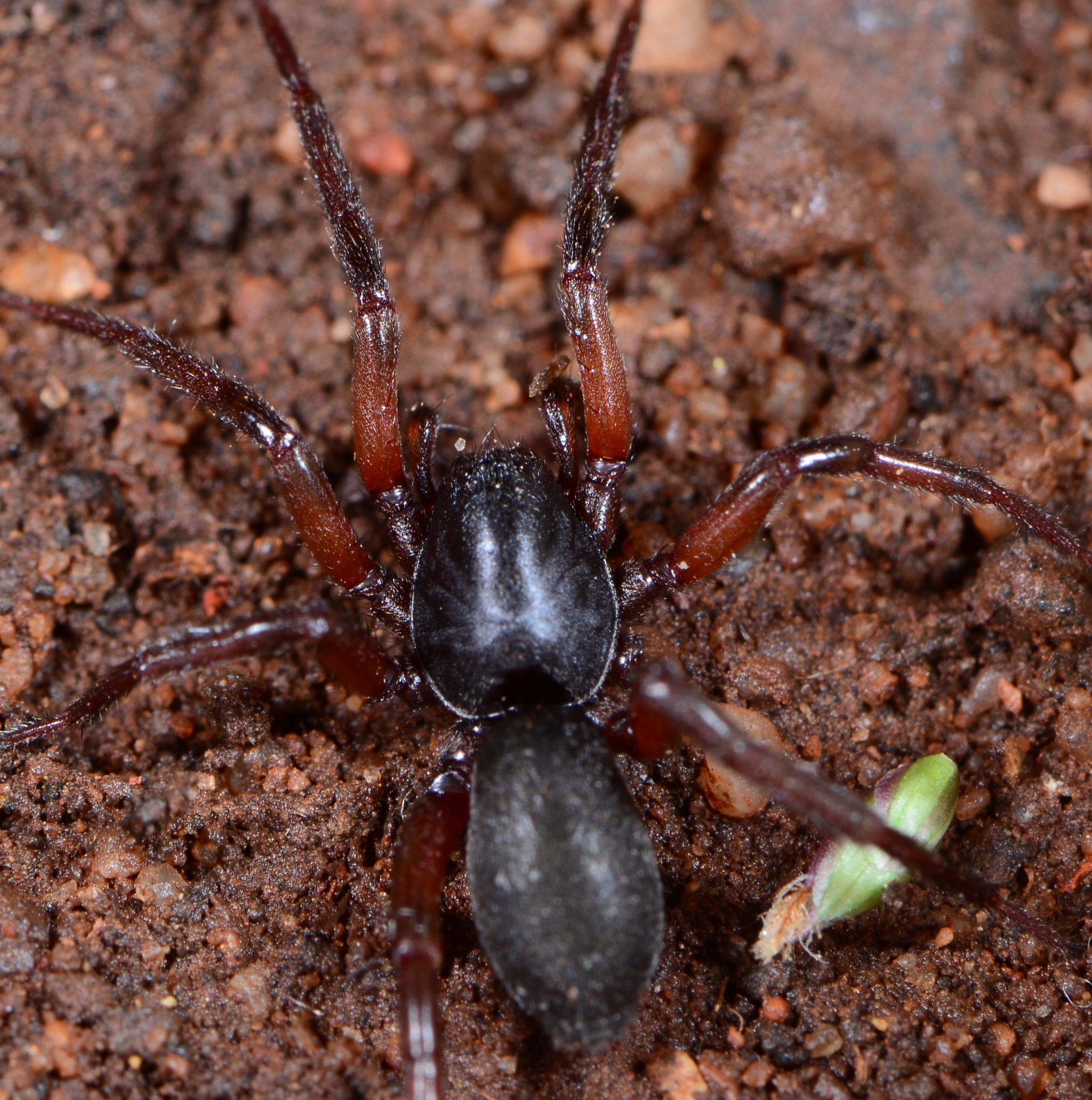
- Female

Scientific classification
- Kingdom: Animalia
- Phylum: Arthropoda
- Subphylum: Chelicerata
- Class: Arachnida
- Order: Araneae
- Infraorder: Araneomorphae
- Family: Liocranidae
- Genus: Rhaeboctesis
- Species: R. exilis

Binomial name
- Rhaeboctesis exilis Tucker, 1920

= Rhaeboctesis exilis =

Mussina Rhaeboctesis Sac Spider

Species of spider

Rhaeboctesis exilis is a species of spider in the family Liocranidae. It is endemic to South Africa and is commonly known as the Mussina rhaeboctesis sac spider.

== Distribution ==
Rhaeboctesis exilis is found in three provinces of South Africa, KwaZulu-Natal, Limpopo, and Mpumalanga. Notable locations include Ndumo Game Reserve, Kruger National Park, various nature reserves in the Limpopo Province, and the Lowveld National Botanical Garden.

== Habitat and ecology ==
The species inhabits Indian Ocean Coastal Belt and Savanna biomes at altitudes ranging from 47 to 1,523 m above sea level. These are free-running ground spiders that are rarely encountered.

== Conservation ==
Rhaeboctesis exilis is listed as Least Concern due to its wide geographical range. The species is known from eight protected areas, and threats to this species are not considered significant.

== Taxonomy ==
The species was originally described by Tucker in 1920 from Mussina (now Musina) in the Limpopo Province. The genus remains unrevised.
