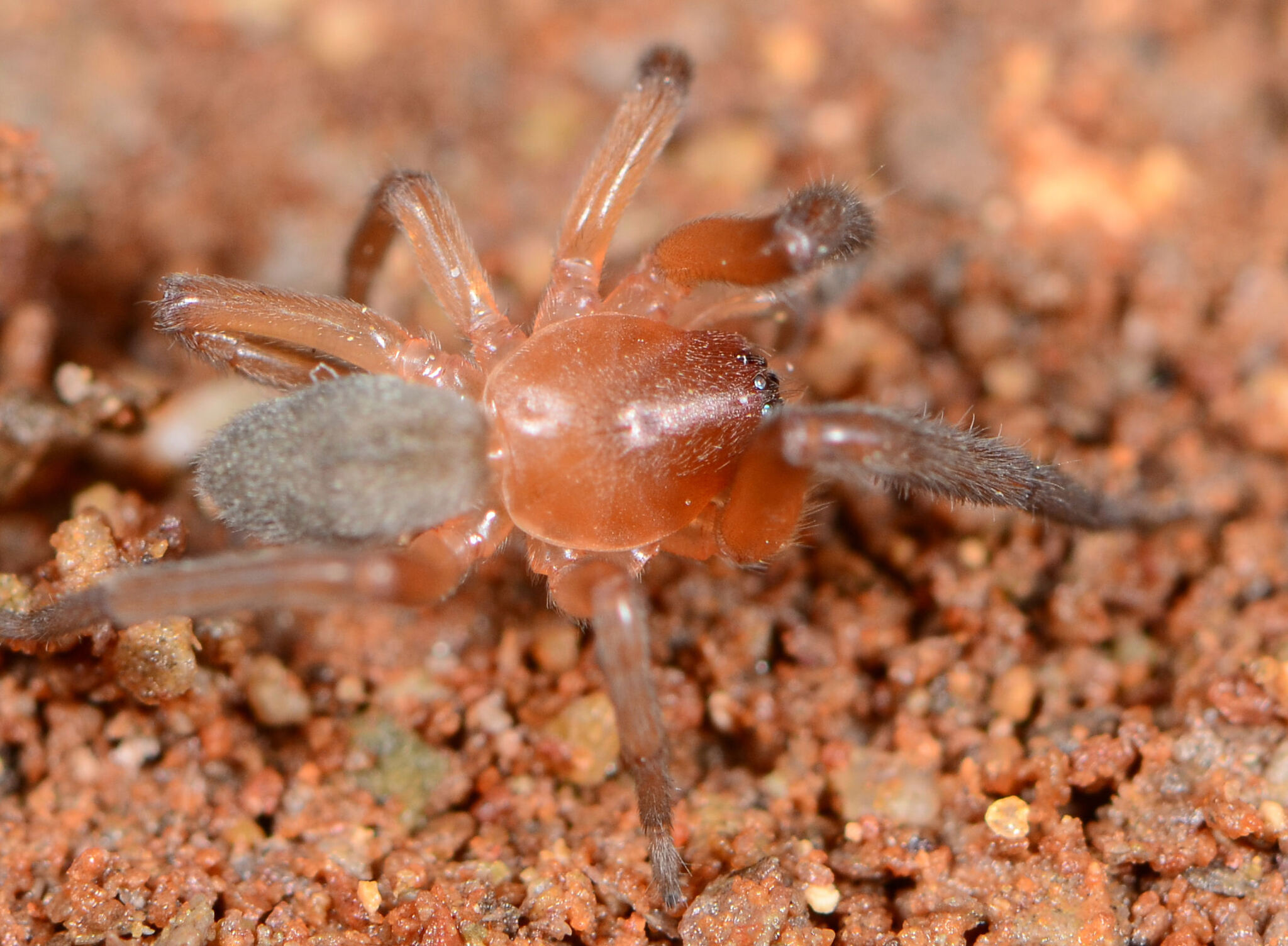
- Female
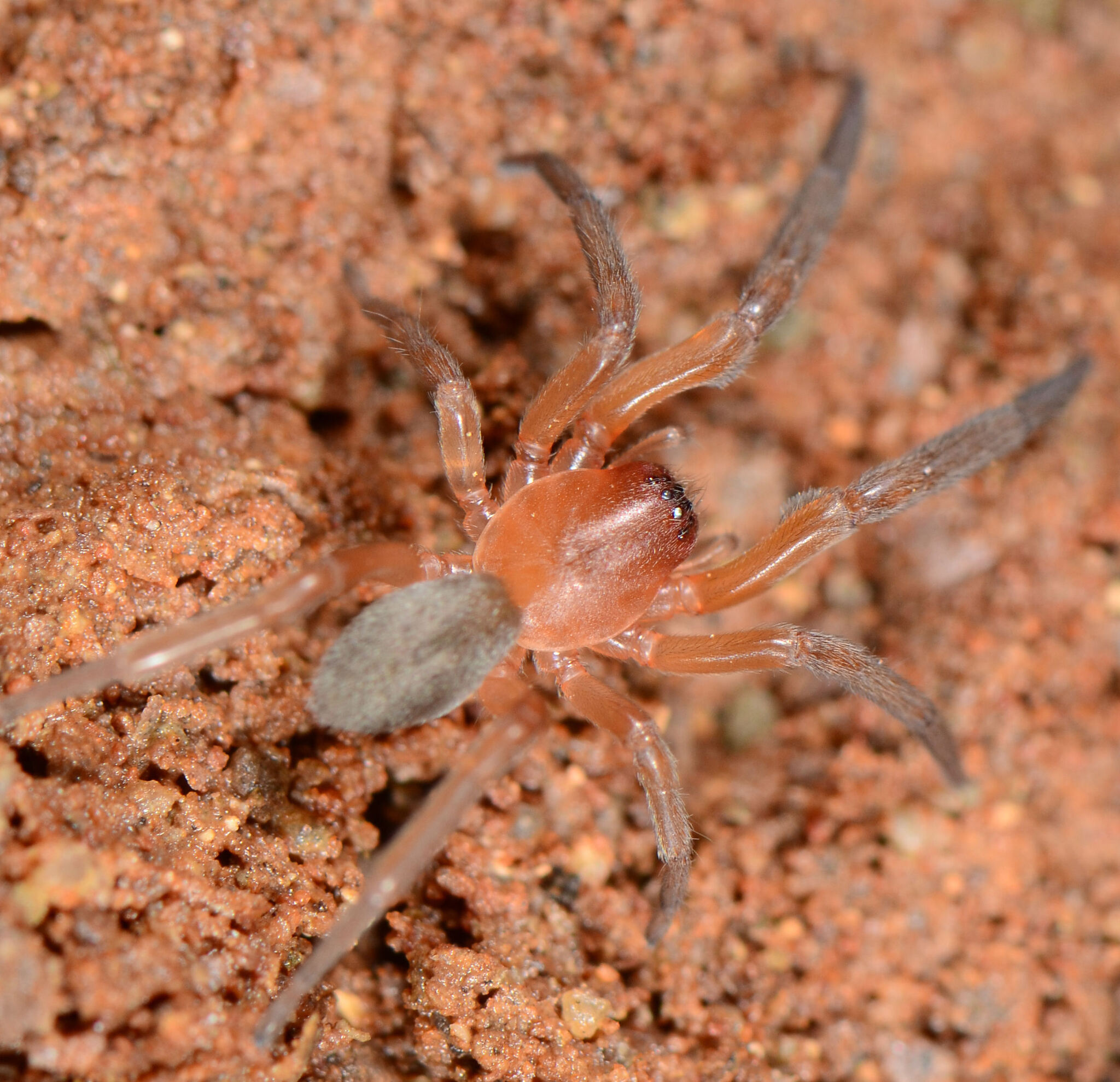
- Female

Scientific classification
- Kingdom: Animalia
- Phylum: Arthropoda
- Subphylum: Chelicerata
- Class: Arachnida
- Order: Araneae
- Infraorder: Araneomorphae
- Family: Liocranidae
- Genus: Rhaeboctesis
- Species: R. secunda

Binomial name
- Rhaeboctesis secunda Tucker, 1920

= Rhaeboctesis secunda =

Hanover Rhaeboctesis Sac Spider

Species of spider

Rhaeboctesis secunda is a species of spider in the family Liocranidae. It occurs in southern Africa and is commonly known as the Hanover Rhaeboctesis sac spider.

== Distribution ==
Rhaeboctesis secunda is found in Lesotho and South Africa. In South Africa, it has been recorded from Eastern Cape, Free State, North West, Northern Cape, and Western Cape. Notable locations include Tsolwana Nature Reserve, Pilanesberg Nature Reserve, Vaalbos National Park, and Anysberg Nature Reserve.

== Habitat and ecology ==
The species inhabits Grassland, Nama Karoo, and Savanna biomes at altitudes ranging from 371 to 1,558 m above sea level.

These are free-running ground spiders.

== Conservation ==
Rhaeboctesis secunda is listed as Least Concern due to its wide geographical range. The species is protected in six protected areas, and threats to this species are not considered significant.

== Taxonomy ==
The species was originally described by Tucker in 1920 from Hanover in the Northern Cape. The genus remains unrevised.
