= Rhaeboctesis equestris =

Scientific classification
- Kingdom: Animalia
- Phylum: Arthropoda
- Subphylum: Chelicerata
- Class: Arachnida
- Order: Araneae
- Infraorder: Araneomorphae
- Family: Liocranidae
- Genus: Rhaeboctesis
- Species: R. equestris

Binomial name
- Rhaeboctesis equestris Simon, 1897

Species of spider

Rhaeboctesis equestris is a species of spider in the family Liocranidae. It is endemic to South Africa.

== Distribution ==
Rhaeboctesis equestris is found in South Africa, though the exact distribution is unclear as the type locality is given only as "Africa australis" (southern Africa).

== Habitat and ecology ==
The species is described as a free-running ground spider, but specific habitat information is not available.

== Description ==
The species is known only from a female with a total length of 11 mm.

== Conservation ==
Rhaeboctesis equestris is listed as Data Deficient due to both taxonomic and unknown provenance reasons. The identification of this species is problematic as no drawings were provided in the original description, and the description is not detailed enough for correct identification. More sampling is needed to collect males and determine the species' range.

== Taxonomy ==
The species was originally described by Eugène Simon in 1897 as the type species of the genus Rhaeboctesis. The genus remains unrevised.
