= Cho Hyun-ju =

Squid Game character

- Squid Game character
- Park Sung-hoon as Cho Hyun-ju in Squid Game season 2
- First appearance: "001" (2024)
- Last appearance: "It's Not Your Fault" (2025)
- Created by: Hwang Dong-hyuk
- Portrayed by: Park Sung-hoon
- Voiced by: Nicky Endres (English); Sushant Divgikar (Hindi); Virginie Emane (French); Zara Dobura (Portuguese)

In-universe information
- Alias: Player 120
- Occupation: Special Forces operator (formerly)
- Nationality: South Korean
- Allies: Kim Young-mi; Park Gyeong-seok; Jang Geum-ja; Park Yong-sik; Seong Gi-hun; Kim Jun-hee; Park Jung-bae; Kang Dae-ho; Oh Young-il; Kim Jun-hee's baby; Kwon Byeong-su; Player 145
- Enemies: Seon-nyeo; Kim Yeong-sam; Choi Hyuk; Lee Myung-gi; Nam-gyu; Player 202; Kang No-eul; Player 039

Cho Hyun-ju (Korean: 조현주), also known as Player 120, is a character in both the second and third seasons of South Korean Netflix drama Squid Game. In the series, she is a highly skilled and highly trained ex-Special Forces soldier until she was discharged after coming out as a trans woman, further losing family support and employment. She joins Squid Game to win money in order to support her gender-affirming surgery and possibly move to Thailand to live as a kathoey, and befriends multiple characters, including a woman named Kim Young-mi. She is a leader of her own group with Young-mi and the archenemy of Seon-nyeo. She was created by series creator Hwang Dong-hyuk and portrayed by Park Sung-hoon, a cisgender man. Hwang expressed difficulty in finding a trans female actor in South Korea, citing how South Koreans treat trans people as a reason for casting being difficult. Park worked with trans people in order to portray the character accurately, hoping to avoid caricaturing her.

When it was announced that Hyun-ju would be played by a cisgender man, the show, Hwang, and Park received criticism, with people on social media and critics arguing that casting a cisgender man in this role affirmed an anti-trans notion that trans women are men. It was also argued that it would be more ideal to cast a trans or cisgender woman instead. On release, Hyun-ju was received well for her portrayal and writing, with multiple critics considering the character an authentic representation of trans women. There was also a hope that Hyun-ju would lead to further acceptance and better representation in the future.

== Appearances ==
Cho Hyun-ju appears in the second season of Squid Game, a trans woman who formerly served as a soldier in the South Korean military as a sergeant until she was discharged for wanting to transition. She also lost family support and struggled to find employment. She was invited to join a game called Squid Game due to the financial strain, as well as her desire to move to Thailand and receive gender-affirming surgery. Her debts would be shown to the rest of the player by a manager, disappointing herself. During the first game, she gets confused as to what Seong Gi-hun is saying. But when a player named Kang Mi-na dies, she along with the other players discover that losing has lethal consequences, proving Gi-hun right. At the end, she assists Gi-hun in rescuing a man who had been eliminated and shot but had not died; the man is subsequently killed after the game ends by No-eul, a North Korean defector and soldier in the Squid Games. During the interim, the surviving players learn that the total reward is 45,600,000,000 won, and they would receive 100 million won per person who died split between the survivors (91,000,000 won). Given the choice to vote to stay or leave, she votes to stay, and the game continues by a slim majority.

Hyun-ju later befriends a woman named Kim Young-mi, who asks to join her, later adding Jang Geum-ja, her son Park Yong-sik, and a shaman named Seon-nyeo, where they have to complete a series of five games while chained side by side. From there, Hyun-ju watches her teammates, as well as stopping Seon-nyeo from disturbing Young-mi and Geum-ja, and slapping and threatening her to complete the games or face death. She then tells everyone to look away from her while she finishes the last game, as she is self-conscious about not having had bottom surgery. Hyun-ju assists the other members with advice and emotional support. Due to her expenses related to transition and a lack of a source of income, Hyun-ju votes to remain in the game again, with the result being to continue and unintentionally upsets Young-mi. During the next game, Young-mi is killed, causing Hyun-ju to become anguished and blames Lee Myung-gi, but she is then forced to move on. After Mingle, Seon-nyeo mocks Hyun-ju about Young-mi's death and predicts Geum-ja's and Yong-sik's future. Hyun-ju is angered and attempts to attack her, only to be stop and Seon-nyeo walks away. Along with Geum-ja and Yong-sik, she allies with Gi-hun's team, votes to terminate the games, joins the X Team and allies with Park Gyeong-seok, eventually agreeing to participate in a revolt by helping steal guns from soldiers and attempting to take over the facility in order to capture the Masked Officer. After the bathroom fight that results Thanos's death and conflict with the X Team and the O Team, Gi-hun explains a riot that makes the players to kill each other. Hyun-ju hides and pretends to be dead. Once the Masked Officer initiated reinforcements, Hyun-ju strikes back along with the other player. As the soldiers retreated, Hyun-ju joins Gi-hun and some players to help take control the games. She also explains to the players how to reload the guns, revealing to Gyeong-seok that she work in the Korean Special Forces. She provides support while Gi-hun and Jung-bae goes deeper. She sends Kang Dae-ho, an ex-marine and one of Gi-hun's allies, to get more ammo, but when he doesn't return, she goes to see what's wrong, leaving Gyeong-seok and the players to keep fighting against the soldiers. She finds Dae-ho with the ammo, but he is distressed due to the fact he lied about being a marine and is thoroughly unprepared for violence. During this, the others and Jung-bae are killed or apprehended, and the revolt is defeated. She prepares to fight a squad in the dorm, but Geum-ja stops her.

After Gi-hun awakes and chained by soldiers, Hyun-ju asks about Jung-bae and apologises to Gi-hun, only to be stopped by Yong-sik, who blames Dae-ho for not returning the ammo. Hyun-ju participates in the game Hide and Seek/Keys and Knives as a hider. Hyun-ju and the others hiders on the blue-vest team are forced to hide and flee from the red-vested team of players attempting to kill them. She teams up with Kim Jun-hee and Geum-ja, assists in delivering Jun-hee's baby, and defends them by killing two seekers (Kim Yeong-sam aka 226, and 202). After finding the exit, she almost crosses it, but selflessely returns to the others instead to bring them along. This selfless act costs her her life, as upon reuniting with her friends, she is fatally stabbed by Lee Myung-gi, who is on a murder spree with Nam-gyu. Realizing that Jun-hee, whom he cares about, is in the room, Myung-gi closes the door without hurting the other two. Geum-ja closes a dead Hyun-ju's eyes, and, by following Hyun'ju's blood stains, she and Jun-hee successfully reaches the exit with the newborn child, surviving the game.

She is later mourned by her friends, including by Geum-ja, who says that Hyun-ju sacrificed her life for them. Hyun-ju makes a brief final appearance in season three's third episode, "It's Not Your Fault", as one of many dead corpses being placed in coffins by the guards after the game.

== Concept and creation ==
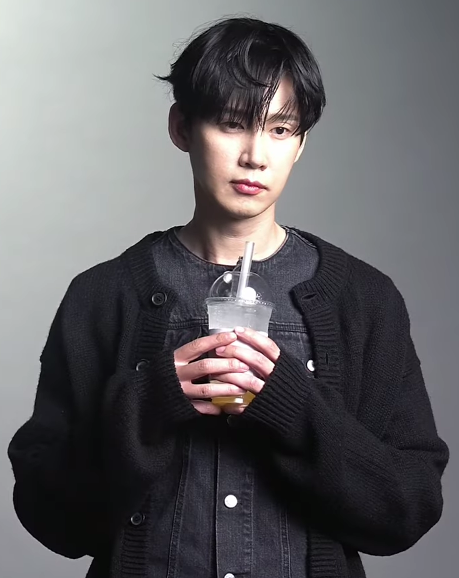
Park Sung-hoon portrayed Hyun-ju. He worked with trans people in order to portray the character accurately.

The character of Cho Hyun-ju was developed by Squid Game creator Hwang Dong-hyuk, who compared her in purpose to the character Ali Abdul from the first season of Squid Game. Where he included Ali to represent people in South Korea who are marginalized in non-financial ways, he wanted to include a transgender character to do the same in season 2. He hoped that her choices, actions, and the way she "carries herself in the game" would raise awareness of issues surrounding trans people in South Korea. Hwang intended to cast a trans actor in the role, but found that there were "close to no actors that are openly trans" due to the marginalization of LGBTQ+ people in South Korean society, and expressed displeasure with this. Hwang believed Hyun-ju would be the "most beloved" character of the season.

Roh Jae-won originally had the role of Hyun-ju, but then Hwang had Park Sung-hoon to take over the role. Jae-won then had gotten a separate role as Nam-gyu.

Hwang ultimately decided to cast actor Park Sung-hoon, a cisgender man. Park believed that he was cast because of a "feminine side" that he developed through growing up with sisters, as well as his performance in the 2021 film Hee-soo. He stated that he approached his performance with "more detail and caution", consulting with trans people to make sure Hyun-ju was not caricaturized. Park avoided exaggerating gestures such as his voice, feeling that altering his naturally deep speaking-tone would "undermine the emotional authenticity". The character's short bangs were chosen by Park, according to him. Describing the character, Park said that Hyun-ju shows "incredible strength, decisiveness, and natural leadership" despite the prejudices she faces, calling her "inspiring" and a character who "breaks down stereotypes". While discussing the fight-choreography for Hyun-ju, stunt-coordinator Park Young-sick explained that, unlike many other characters' fighting which has a "raw survival-action feel", Hyun-ju needed a more "professional feel", taking her "background, profession, and physical [ability] into account".

Hyun-ju is voiced in the Hindi dub by genderfluid performer Sushant Divgikar, and in the English dub by nonbinary transfeminine actor Nicky Endres.

== Reception ==
The casting of a cisgender man instead of a trans woman or cisgender woman received controversy, something creator Hwang Dong-hyuk anticipated. TV Guide writer Kat Moon believed that the controversy created more conversations about LGBTQ+ representation and "moved the needle" on the subject outside of the US. Vogue writer Radhika Seth felt that, despite Hyun-ju's arc being handled sensitively and her being a powerful character, it felt "jarring" that a cisgender man was cast at a time that Hollywood is casting more carefully. Seth noted that, while this was significant for trans people in South Korea, for many, there is still more to go. The Mary Sue writer Rachel Ulatowski considered it a "small sign of progress," noting that there is progress that can be made still. Digital Spy writer David Opie found Hyun-ju's portrayal more compassionate than one might expect from Squid Game, citing how many characters refer to her as unnie (Korean: 언니, an affectionate term for "older sister" in Korean) and one scene where a female character takes Hyun-ju to the women's bathroom with her. Opie found it "remarkable" that a South Korean show affirm Hyun-ju's gender considering the politics surrounding trans people in South Korea, comparing her positively to what he considered a negative portrayal of homosexuality in season 1 of the predatory VIP character.

The writing and portrayal of Hyun-ju has received generally positive reception, identified as "by far the best addition" in season 2 by USA Today writer Kelly Lawler. Discussing Film writer James Crooks, while noting that the character is likely to "spark some unnecessary online discourse," the inclusion of Hyun-ju helped add a "heart-warming level of emotional depth" to the story.

Upon hearing about the casting of a cis man, Inverse writer Dais Johnston found the character "regressive." They criticized the casting of cis men as problematic, stating that "trans women are women, not men in costumes, and should be portrayed as such." Johnston disputed arguments that South Korean trans actresses were not feasible to cast, citing examples such as Lee Si-yeon and Choi Hae-jun. They also responded to arguments that a post-transition actress would not be able to portray a pre-transition character accurately, arguing that because Hyun-ju is apparently saving up for bottom surgery, it wouldn't have mattered if the actress was post-transition. Johnston acknowledged that a trans actress may not want to play the role due to the role potentially leading to abuse, but cited trans women characters in the Japanese series Alice in Borderland and the South Korean series Itaewon Class, both of whom are portrayed by cisgender women. They felt this was not ideal, but was better than using a cisgender man, arguing that in casting a cisgender man, it suggests that trans women are "men in disguise," suggesting it as a caricature and expressing skepticism about how the character would be handled. After watching the series, Johnston was "shocked" by how well Hyun-ju's story was executed, saying that her story was "handled with extreme care" and praising the show for not featuring any misgendering, deadnaming, or "tragic flashbacks."

According to My Daily writer Lee Seung-gil, despite viewers having concerns about the character before release, both the character and actor received positive reception in South Korea. Lee considered her the best character in the second season, praising Park for his understated and realistic performance. Top Star News writer Hwang Seong-yong felt that Hyun-ju was a difficult character to perform, one that requires the performer to demonstrate both the strength of a soldier and "delicate inner self" of a trans person. They praised Park for managing to pull this off, saying that this proved the versatility of his acting. The Mary Sue writer Annie Banks praised the second season for featuring a trans character, calling her story "authentic" and expressed hope that this would lead to further inclusion of trans characters in K-dramas. Gizmodo writers Germain Lussier and Cheryl Eddy identified her as one of the best parts of the second season, saying that while it would be better if she was played by a trans woman, they appreciated that her presence felt important and not merely added for diversity. Den of Geek writer Brynna Arens considered her the "MVP" of the second season, praising her for her competence, bravery, sympathizing as an American with the plight of being desperate for healthcare. Despite her praise, she felt it unfortunate that Park was cast, saying that casting a cisgender man doesn't help the "harmful stereotype" perpetuated by anti-trans groups that trans women are men. She felt that, even with this, it is important for people to understand the difference between acceptance of trans people in the US and South Korea.

Slate writer Nadira Goffe considered Hyun-ju's death to be the hardest death for them in the third season, believing her to be captivating and a highlight of the series' latter two seasons. They commented on Hyun-ju not just being a kind character who protects the weak, but also someone who will encourage them to overcome their limitations. They felt that her death came too soon, and stated that her selflessness was what led to her death.
