= Front Man (Squid Game) =

Squid Game antagonist

- Squid Game character
- Lee Byung-hun as the unmasked Front Man in season 2
- First appearance: "Red Light, Green Light" (2021)
- Last appearance: "Humans Are..." (2025)
- Created by: Hwang Dong-hyuk
- Portrayed by: Lee Byung-hun
- Voiced by: Tom Choi (English)

In-universe information
- Full name: Hwang In-ho
- Aliases: Player 001; Player 132; Oh Young-il
- Occupation: Police officer (formerly); Front man
- Family: Hwang Jun-ho (half-brother); Park Mal-soon (step-mother); Wife (deceased)
- Children: 1
- Nationality: South Korean
- Date of birth: February 2, 1976
- Allies: Oh Il-nam; Masked Officer; The Recruiter; Pink Guards; VIPs; Park Yeong-gil; Captain Ko; Seong Ga-yeong; American Recruiter; Kim Jun-hee's baby; Lee Myung-gi; Kang Dae-ho; Kim Jun-hee
- Enemies: Hwang Jun-ho; Byeong-gi; Seong Gi-hun; Cho Sang-woo; Kang Sae-byeok; Park Jung-bae; Park Gyeong-seok; Kang No-eul; Jang Deok-su; Thanos; Nam-gyu; Gyeong-su; Im Jeong-dae; Seon-nyeo; Sim Jae-seok; Kwon Byeong-su; Player 015

The Front Man, (Korean: 프론트 맨; pronounced [pʰɯɾontʰɯ mɛn]), real name Hwang In-ho (Korean: 황인호; pronounced [hwaŋ.in.ho]), is a fictional character in the Netflix TV series Squid Game. Conceived by series creator Hwang Dong-hyuk and portrayed by Lee Byung-hun, who assisted in developing the character, he is the emotionally detached head of the Squid Game hierarchy, initiating and managing the competition while hiding his identity behind a voice-altering mask.

In the first season, his half-brother Hwang Jun-ho's search for him acts as one of the main plotlines, leading to the revelations that In-ho, a former police officer, won a previous edition of Squid Game as Player 132 and is now the Front Man. It is later revealed that he had participated in a futile attempt to save his terminally-ill pregnant wife, and won by executing an offer from the game's creator and original Front Man, Oh Il-nam, to kill the other finalists. Sometime after his victory, In-ho started working for the organization behind the games, becoming the Front Man and cutting off ties to his family and former life.

In the first season, the Front Man is mainly shown overseeing and organizing the games. However, in the second season, he masquerades as Player 001, a participant with the fake name "Oh Young-il" (오영일; [ˈo̞(ː).jʌ̹ŋ.iɭ]), to befriend main protagonist Seong Gi-hun and undermine the latter's plans to take down the games. He resumes his role as Front Man in the season finale and then throughout all of the third season. An ambiguous character who is arguably the show's main antagonist, his cynical views are opposed to Gi-Hun's continued determination and belief in humanity.

== Appearances ==
=== Squid Game season 1 ===
In the first season, In-ho is the organizer of the games, going by the alias the Front Man and dressed all in black. During Red Light, Green Light, the Front Man calmly watches the game while listening to "Fly Me to the Moon". After the Sugar Honeycomb game, he goes in the game hall and shoots a rogue for showing his face to a player. When the players return to the game, the Front Man orders a supervisor to keep an eye on those who have not returned. One night, an altercation occurs with guards and a player named Byeong-gi who is a doctor helping to harvest the organs of executed players in exchange for hints on surviving the games; in the end, the Front Man kills a guard and orders Byeong-gi's execution. He also discovers that there is an infiltrator among the workers. Before the VIPs arrive, he discovers that the infiltrator is his brother, police Detective Hwang Jun-ho. In the fifth game, the Front Man serves as a host for the VIPs, and when Jun-ho assaults one of them, the Front Man begins a chase. On a remote island, the Front Man confronts Jun-ho near a cliff, revealing that he is his missing brother and asking him to join forces, but Jun-ho refuses. In-ho then shoots him, and he falls off the cliff. After Seong Gi-hun wins the games, he meets the Front Man, who tells him to think it was all a dream. A year later, Gi-hun finds an invitation card at an airport and calls the number on it, promising to get revenge on the organizers. The Front Man answers and tells him to get on his plane, but Gi-hun hangs up and leaves the terminal.

=== Squid Game season 2 ===
In the second season, after Gi-hun leaves the terminal, the Front Man tells him that he will regret what he has done and Gi-hun replies that he will find the organizers.

Two years later, during a Halloween party, the Front Man has Gi-hun picked up in a limousine, where Gi-hun asks him to end the games. When the Front Man reveals that he was aware of Gi-hun's plan to sabotage him, Gi-hun asks instead to return to the games, to which the Front Man agrees.

With Gi-hun in the dorm, the Front Man keeps a watchful eye on him. During "Red Light, Green Light", the Front Man notices that thanks to Gi-hun's instructions, fewer players were eliminated. He then decides to infiltrate the game as Player 001, to teach Gi-hun a lesson, and ends up being the deciding vote to continue the games while he instructs the Masked Officer to control the games.

In-ho, as Player 001, votes O making all players stay in the games. He then approaches Gi-hun and forms a team with him. Gi-hun witnesses In-ho fighting Thanos and Nam-gyu, saving Lee Myung-gi's life, trying to earn Gi-hun's trust. At night, In-ho tells Gi-hun his supposed reason for joining the games: his terminally ill wife fell pregnant, and in an attempt to find an organ donor to save both her and her unborn child, he accepted money from a criminal; the transaction was misunderstood as a bribe, and he was kicked off of the police force. In reality, this was actually part of why he became the Front Man.

In the Six-Legged Pentathlon, In-ho and Im Jeong-dae with the O Team finds out that the next game wasn't Dalgona. As Jeong-dae continues to make false remakrs, In-ho steps in to defend Gi-hun. Afterwards, In-ho teams with Gi-hun, Park Jung-bae, Kang Dae-ho and Kim Jun-hee. When it is his turn to throw the spinning top in the Six-Legged Pentathlon, In-ho, who is left-handed, purposely wastes the team's time by using his right hand but still manages to gain their trust. After the game, In-ho introduces himself to his team under the pseudonym "Oh Young-il". "Oh" (오) can be used to represent "zero". "Young" (영) can also mean "zero" and "Il" (일) can mean "one". Therefore, "Oh Young Il" literally translates to "Oh Zero One" or "001", forming a pun for the pseudonym "Player 001" and hinting at In-ho's true identity as a fake player. After they return to the Dormitory, In-ho is seen with Jung-bae and Dae-ho confronting Thanos and Nam-gyu the second time and both stare at each other and Thanos leaves, sparing Myung-gi again. During the next vote, In-ho tries to convince people to vote to leave using Kim Young-mi's plea as his advantage, but Jeong-dae argues with him and uses the O Team as his own advantage. The players vote to continue the games and In-ho stares at Gi-hun.

In the third game (Mingle), after they survived the first round Cho Hyun-ju's team, In-ho is seen staring at Gi-hun, who looks at the eliminated players being shot before being interrupted by Seon-nyeo. The last round, In-ho kills a player via snapping their neck in order to save himself and Park Jung-bae. A fight breaks out in the bathroom, causing Thanos's death and more conflict with the X Team and the O Team.

Gi-hun realizes that there will be a fight that night and hatches a plan that leaves In-ho perplexed. Gi-hun wants his group to start a rebellion to end the games. In-ho initially opposes the idea, saying it's too risky and suggests they should instead attack the O Team first. Gi-hun suggests they hide under the beds as the lights turn off, allowing the O Team to murder the other sleeping X Team, to maintain the ruse and keep the plan hidden. This leads In-ho to subtly smile while stating that Gi-hun is essentially sacrificing human lives for the greater good, and he agrees to help with the rebellion.

When the guards enter the dorm to stop the fight, Gi-hun and his team, including In-ho, take the guns from the guards and start a rebellion. During the rebellion, In-ho offers to go with Gi-hun through the compound to find the control room, but Gi-hun chooses to go with his friend Jung-bae instead. In-ho, along with Kwon Byeong-su and another player, go to help them and Gi-hun gives him his last magazine. Eventually, In-ho sabotages and kills the two players who were with him, faking "Young-il"'s death as well. After this, he radios the guards to "wrap things up". Gi-hun and Jung-bae surrender, and In-ho, now dressed as the Front Man, comes with the Masked Officer and several guards and asks him if it was worth it to "play the hero". He then kills Jung-bae in front of Gi-hun, leaving him hysterical and devastated as he walks away with the Masked Officer.

=== Squid Game season 3 ===
After the failed rebellion, Gi-hun is returned as the apparent sole survivor (unbeknownst to anyone else, Gyeong-seok/Player 246 was saved by Kang No-eul/Guard 011). In-ho has a phone call with Captain Park who works for him as a mole, keeping an eye on In-ho's brother Jun-ho and the mercenary group hired by Gi-hun, preventing them from finding the island. In-ho orders Park to kill everyone in Jun-ho's team if things go wrong, including his own brother. Subsequently, almost the entire team is later killed by Captain Park after Choi Woo-seok calls Jun-ho and warns him that the Captain is working for the Squid Game organization. Jun-ho manages to fatally wound the Captain. Before his death, Park tells Jun-ho that he saved him from drowning 4 years ago because In-ho had ordered him "to do whatever it took to keep you alive". Later, In-ho calls his brother and tells him that he will die if he continues to investigate the games, but Jun-ho defies him by saying "then you'll have to kill me".

In-ho continues to monitor the games when they continue, eventually welcoming the VIPs. During the aftermath of the Jump Rope game which resulted in Jun-hee's death, shortly after she gave birth to her baby, the Front Man decides the baby is designated as Jun-hee's replacement for Player 222.

Gi-hun, who swore to care for the baby after Jun-hee's death, is summoned to meet In-ho in his office where he finally reveals himself as the Front Man. After apologising for Jung-bae's death and explaining that the remaining players intend to kill him and the baby to win the prize money, In-ho offers Gi-hun a knife and proposes that Gi-hun kills the other finalists first to save himself and the baby. It is then revealed that during the 2015 games that In-Ho won, Oh Il-nam (who was the Host at the time) made the same proposition to In-ho in a similar situation; In-ho killed the other finalists and was traumatised by his actions. This is implied to be what began his descent into becoming the Front Man.

Gi-hun ultimately doesn't kill the other finalists after a hallucination of Sae-byeok about him not being that kind of person (which is also the reason why Gi-hun did not kill Sang-woo in Season 1) and proceeds with them to the final game, Sky Squid Game. During the final game, with In-ho and the VIPs watching, Gi-hun manages to outlive the remaining finalists including Lee Myung-gi (the father of Jun-hee's child and whom In-ho saved from Thanos and Nam-gyu). Due to an oversight made by them in not beginning the final round before Myung-gi's death, Gi-hun decides to sacrifice his life to allow Jun-hee's child to win the final round. As he does, he declares to In-ho and the VIPs that the players are humans, not horses as In-ho previously described to Gi-hun after his victory against Sang-woo. In-ho, moved by Gi-hun's sacrifice and display of humanity, rescues Jun-hee's baby and leaves Jun-ho when confronted by him. Shortly after, the island's hidden explosives are detonated to destroy the facility.

Six months later, In-ho sends the baby and her prize money to Jun-ho. He also delivers Gi-hun's bloody 456 tracksuit and remaining winnings from the 2020 games to his only child, Ga-yeong, in Los Angeles. While driving through the city, he spots an American Recruiter playing ddakji with a homeless person. He expresses apparent disappointment - having likely been influenced by Gi-hun's experience in the games - before leaving.

== Concept and creation ==
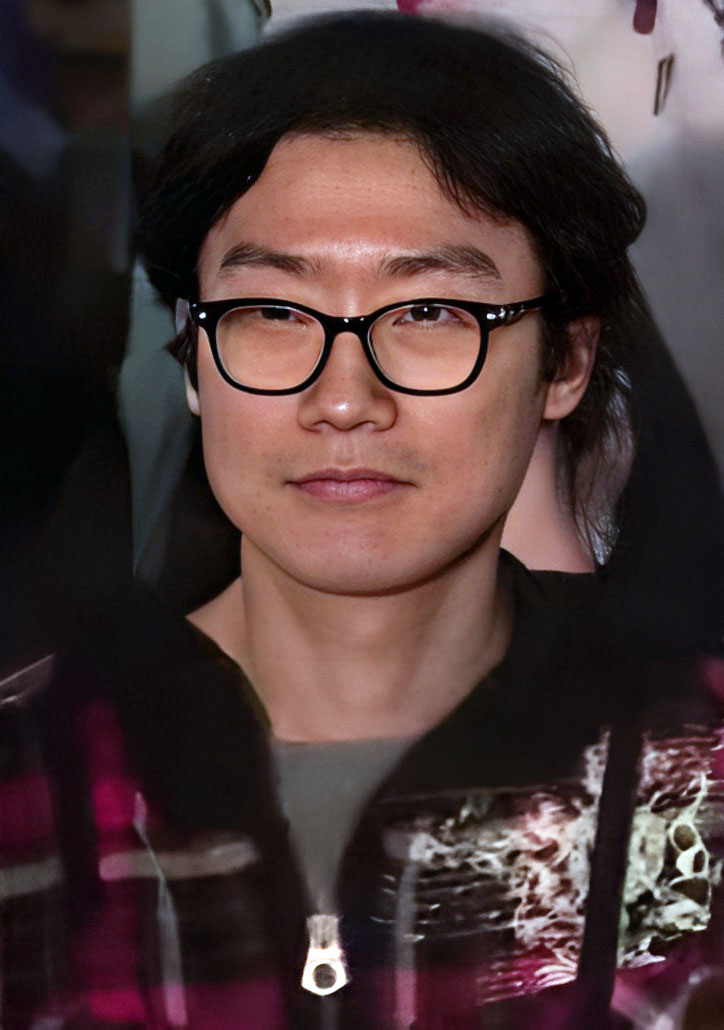
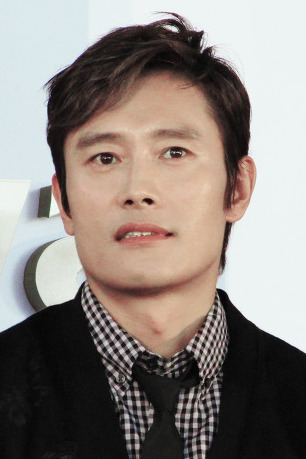
The character was created by director Hwang Dong-hyuk (left) and portrayed by actor Lee Byung-hun (right).

The Front Man was created by series creator Hwang Dong-hyuk and portrayed by Lee Byung-hun. Lee described his appearance in season 1 as more akin to a "cameo appearance," as this character lacked a backstory and did not appear in promotional efforts for the first season. This changed in the second season, in which his character received a more prominent role. Because the character had not been "fully shaped" in season one, Lee and Hwang collaborating on his backstory to create a "fully developed" narrative. Hwang stated that the final results pleased him, calling the Front Man's decision to become a player the most important aspect of the second season.

In season 2, it is revealed that In-ho's reason for playing 28th Squid Games in 2015 was to save his unnamed wife, who had acute liver cirrhosis, and their unborn child. He was the winner of the 2015 games, but by the time he won, his wife had already died. In a mournful and heated conversation between In-ho's stepmother Mal-soon and his half-brother Jun-ho, it is suggested that if In-ho hadn't given his kidney to his brother, he could have sold it, paid for all his wife's treatments and might have been able to save her.

However, in Season 1, Hwang In-ho´s player file makes no mention of him having a wife or being married, and it was implied that his brother Jun-ho needing a kidney transplant was the reason why In-ho played the 2015 games.

Season 3 features a small flashback to 28th Squid Game in which In-ho participated as Player 132. The night before the final game, the Host of the games, Oh Il-nam, gifted In-ho a gold and black knife, giving him an opportunity to "kill the trash". Despite his initial hesitation, In-ho used the knife to kill at least five other finalists while they were sleeping. It remains unanswered why In-ho was the one who got the knife from the Host. It is also unclear was anyone spared by In-ho or if the final game of 2015 was played after this.

Lee stated that the character had three different parts to him: Hwang In-ho, the Front Man, and Oh Young-il, all of which demanded different nuances of his performance. Lee, who found the performance "the most fun" for him as an actor, considered this to be a challenging thing to balance. He specifically cited the scene in which he killed a man to ensure his and Jung-bae's survival during the sixth episode as one where all three sides of the character come out, calling it a "rush of mixed emotions." He worked with Hwang to create a balance between the character's "charismatic and chilling" sides. Lee describes the Front Man as wanting to convince Gi-hun to adopt his pessimistic mindset and share his distaste for the world. He stated that, while the Front Man joined the games to change Gi-hun's mind, Gi-hun's hope for humanity changed his mind somewhat by reminding the Front Man of himself. He felt that while the character must have felt conflicted over killing Jung-bae, the Front Man persona took priority, as killing Jung-bae was the most "extreme" way to show that Gi-hun was wrong.

He is voiced in the English dub by South Korean-American actor Tom Choi as the masked voice.

== Reception ==
Gizmodo writers Germain Lussier and Cheryl Eddy praised the "carefully calibrated duplicity" giving Lee a "juicy part to dive into." Therese Lacson for Collider says that Lee "steps into the role of the Games' turncoat" and that his interpretation of the character shows that "the lines for the Front Man are blurred. Sometimes, it feels like we're looking at Hwang In-ho...But then, sometimes, it feels like we're with the Front Man."
