= Thanos (Squid Game) =

Squid Game character

- Squid Game character
- Choi Seung-hyun (T.O.P) as Thanos in Squid Game season 2
- First appearance: "001" (2024)
- Last appearance: "○△□" (2025)
- Created by: Hwang Dong-hyuk
- Portrayed by: T.O.P
- Voiced by: Matthew Yang King (English)
- Allies: Nam-gyu; Gyeong-su; Im Jeong-dae; Kim Yeong-sam; Kang Mi-na; Player 442; Player 418; Player 056; Player 348
- Enemies: Lee Myung-gi; Park Min-su; Se-mi; Hwang In-ho; Seong Gi-hun; Kang Dae-ho; Park Jung-bae; Kwon Byeong-su; Player 145

In-universe information
- Full name: Choi Su-bong
- Alias: Player 230
- Occupation: Rapper

Choi Su-bong (Korean: 최수봉), known by his stage name Thanos (Korean: 타노스) and as Player 230, is a character and a major antagonist in the second season of the Netflix series Squid Game. He is one of the participants in the fictional Squid Game competition, after he went into debt after investing in a failed cryptocurrency by a YouTuber called MG Coin. He uses drugs during the game, behaving erratically and attacking other players. Thanos is a prominent character in the series and his team being the leader, the best-friend of Nam-gyu and the archenemy of Lee Myung-gi. Thanos makes conflict with Myung-gi, Hwang In-ho, Seong Gi-hun and later briefly with former allies turned enemies: Park Min-su and Se-mi. The character is named after the character Thanos from Marvel Comics.

Thanos is portrayed by Choi Seung-hyun (better known as T.O.P), a rapper who belonged to the K-pop band BigBang. In 2016 he was convicted of marijuana use, which led to a surge of anti-fans among South Koreans. While the character was not created for him, director Hwang Dong-hyuk aimed to find someone who stopped working due to drugs for the role.

The casting of T.O.P caused controversy among South Koreans, including censorship of his face on the Korean show This Morning Daily. This controversy came with criticism of the performance. Hwang expressed surprise that he still had controversy over his drug use, and called him brave for doing the role of a drug user, believing he would be received better in countries with a lower stigma against marijuana use. He was more well received outside of Korea, being voted overwhelmingly the favorite character by Netflix viewers. International commenters also criticized the negative response to T.O.P over his drug use as harsh and unreasonable. He has been contrasted with season 1 villain Jang Deok-su, who was noted by critics as having more of a presence. His performance received both praise and criticism, with differing opinions on whether the way he acted improved or worsened the season.

== Appearances ==
=== In Squid Game Season 2 ===
Choi Su-bong, a.k.a. Thanos, first appears in the second season of Squid Game in its third episode "001", a rapper who joined Squid Game after incurring debts due to a failed cryptocurrency investment, prompting him to harass another player, a YouTuber named Lee Myung-gi over the bad advice he followed. Before he joined, he was about to jump off the Han River Bridge after the scam. He was then approached by The Recruiter, who handed him a card which he accepted. He also befriends a man and bartender named Nam-gyu over their mutual dislike of Myung-gi. . In the games, he complained to the guards about his limited edition shoes and negotiates them with a replacement. His debt was revealed to the players after Cho Hyun-ju's debt. Upon signing the consent form, Thanos and Nam-gyu gets the opportunity to confront Myung-gi and threatens him to pay them back after the games. Thanos later get recognised by Gyeong-su and other fans, so he proceeded to let his fans take a photo with him but a guard declines him to do so. He then took his photo, showing his middle fingers to the camera. During the first game, Red Light, Green Light, he witnesses Kang Mi-na's death, whom he tried to flirt with earlier, realizing the stakes of the game and deciding to take drugs he had stored in a crucifix-shaped container around his neck, causing him to become carefree. While following protagonist Seong Gi-hun's advice on how to survive, he pushes three other players down, causing them to get killed, and having fun while playing and ultimately surviving, disappointing Gi-hun. During a vote to stay or leave and receive a portion of 45,600,000,000 won, Thanos just finished voting and Gi-hun interrupts. Several players such as Im Jeong-dae all think that Gi-hun is here for the money despite being told that he was here before. Thanos tell an angry Gi-hun that he should give everyone tips on how to win, triggering him. Arguments spark between Thanos, Jeong-dae and the O Team against Gi-hun and Park Jung-bae, which Thanos chants with the players who voted to stay encouraging others to vote O. With the slim majority voting to stay, this disappointing Gi-hun the second time. Thanos, Jeong-dae and the O Team continues to mock Gi-hun and convincing players to continue the games. During their meal time, he and Nam-gyu confronts Myung-gi again and they fight until both are overpowered by Hwang In-ho, the front man. He continues to harass and assault Myung-gi, eventually recruiting four players into a five-person team: Nam-gyu, Se-mi, Park Min-su, and Gyeong-su, his group known as "Thanos Team", or "the Thanos World". He agrees to give Nam-gyu some of his drugs to help him calm his nerves during the second game, the five of them stood side to side with their legs tied together. Each player plays one of five games, with Thanos having to bounce a jegi five times before they could then cross the finish line, enjoying himself.

He once again votes to stay in the break between games, with the result being more strongly in favor of staying. In the bathroom, Thanos with the aid from Nam-gyu and Gyeong-su provokes and mocks Myung-gi for voting to leave, angry about this as well as Myung-gi mocking him for forgetting his lines during a performance. Just as he was about to choke Myung-gi, Jung-bae, Kang Dae-ho and In-ho arrives at the scene to defend Myung-gi, causing Thanos to leave the bathroom along with Nam-gyu and Gyeong-su, sparing Myung-gi. During the third game, Mingle, he dances with Nam-gyu, needing to pick a specified number of players and go into a room when the music stops playing and the number is said. When four players are announced, he chooses Min-su over Gyeong-su, kicking the latter in the chest and running into a room with the other members of his team, though expressing confusion about where Gyeong-su is and expressing dismay when he sees him die. He and the other three are able to survive until the end of the game, Min-su having chosen Thanos over Se-mi. After Mingle, Se-mi opposes Thanos and Nam-gyu by voting to terminate the games and joining Gi-hun, causing Thanos to be disappointed. Voting to stay, the vote ends up being a tie, forcing another vote to occur the following day. He confronts Min-su about his vote, harassing him into changing it, which causes Myung-gi and the X Team to defend Min-su. Thanos and Nam-gyu proceeds to mock Min-su and Myung-gi with the X Team. He also then threatens to kill Myung-gi to target Min-su and claim Kim Jun-hee as his, angering Myung-gi. This leads to Thanos repeatedly punching and then strangling Myung-gi, but gets stabbed in the neck with a fork by Myung-gi, killing him. His drugs would later be taken by Nam-gyu. Thanos also appears in Season 3 as a hallucination to Min-su, and was a wholesome welcome back to the new season despite the return being brief.

=== In Squid Game Season 3 ===
Thanos would later be mentioned in Hide and Seek by Nam-gyu to Min-su about the bathroom fight and later Myung-gi about the latter mispronouncing his name as "Nam-su" constantly, annoying him. The drugs would be dropped taken by Min-su, prompting him to take it. Thanos appears to Min-su in a hallucination in the last game, "Sky Squid Game". While Jeong-dae the other players attempts to kill Gi-hun and Jun-hee's baby, he asks for Min-su's help while hanging off a cliff, offering his cross as compensation for helping him. The hallucination changes from Thanos to Nam-gyu momentarily then switching back to Thanos saying Min-su wouldn't be able to handle it and calls him a coward before being kicked by Min-su. After continuous back and forth fighting between Min-su's hallucinations of Nam-gyu and Thanos, it ends. Min-su's triggered withdrawal would then be witnessed by Myung-gi which results in his death. Thanos would be avenged by Gi-hun when Myung-gi falls to his death, whilst fighting him.

=== Other appearances ===
He appears in the video game Squid Game: Unleashed as a playable character.

== Concept and creation ==
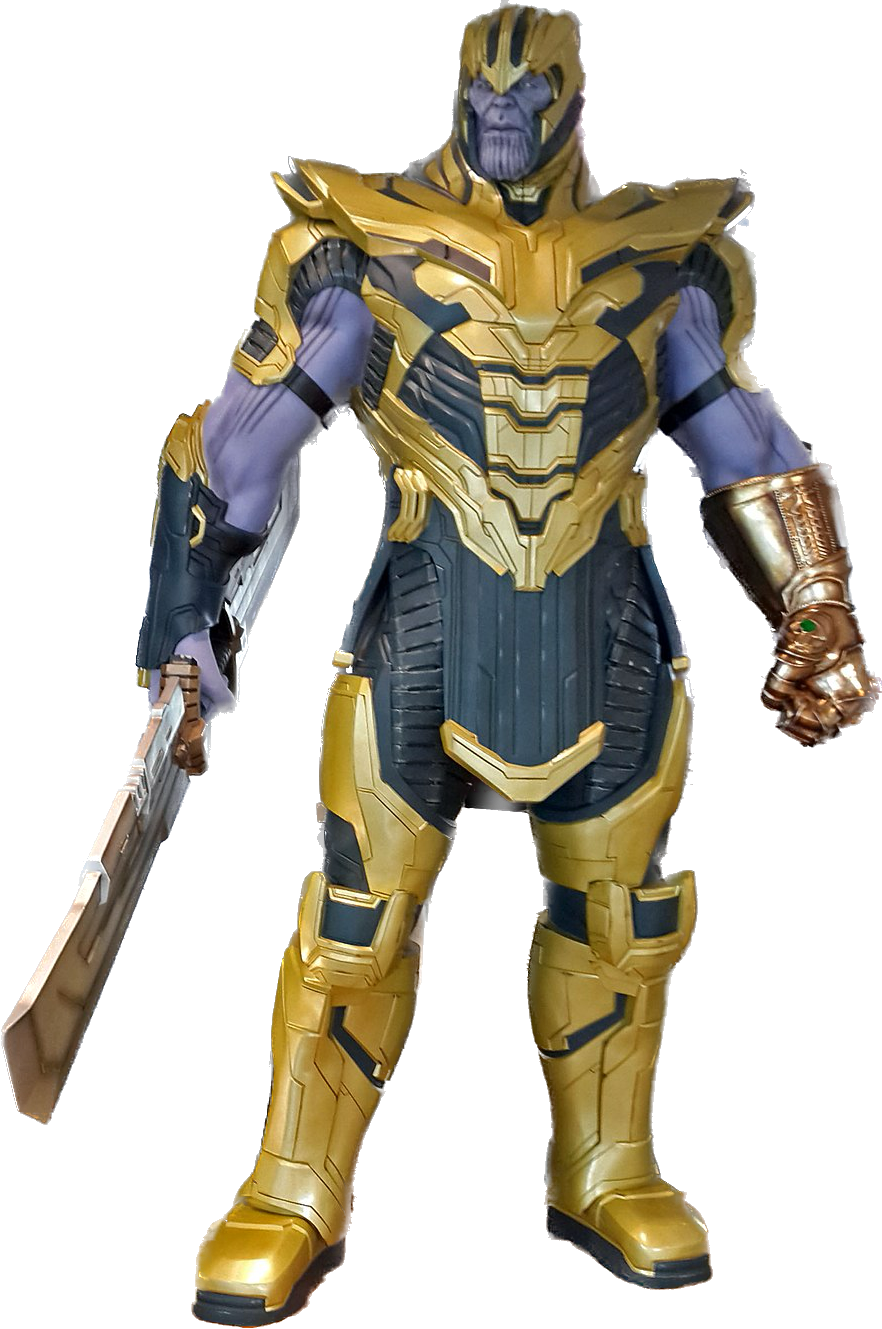
The character's stage name is a reference to the Marvel Comics character of the same name.

The character's stage name is a reference to the Marvel Comics character of the same name, featuring purple hair similar to Thanos' skin color and fingernails painted to resemble the Infinity Stones from Marvel that Thanos uses. Creator Hwang Dong-hyuk stated that he was named Thanos to give the character more worldwide appeal. He speaks Korean, but occasionally speaks English, something found in certain Korean music genres. In the English dub of the show, the voice actor for Thanos only speaks English. Gizmodo writers Germain Lussier and Cheryl Eddy considered him one of the highlights of the season and its best villain, considering him "hilarious and charming." They compared him to Thanos from Marvel, believing that him being "dumb" contrasted with Marvel's Thanos' intelligence, feeling that the rapper Thanos "doesn't quite grasp his own persona."

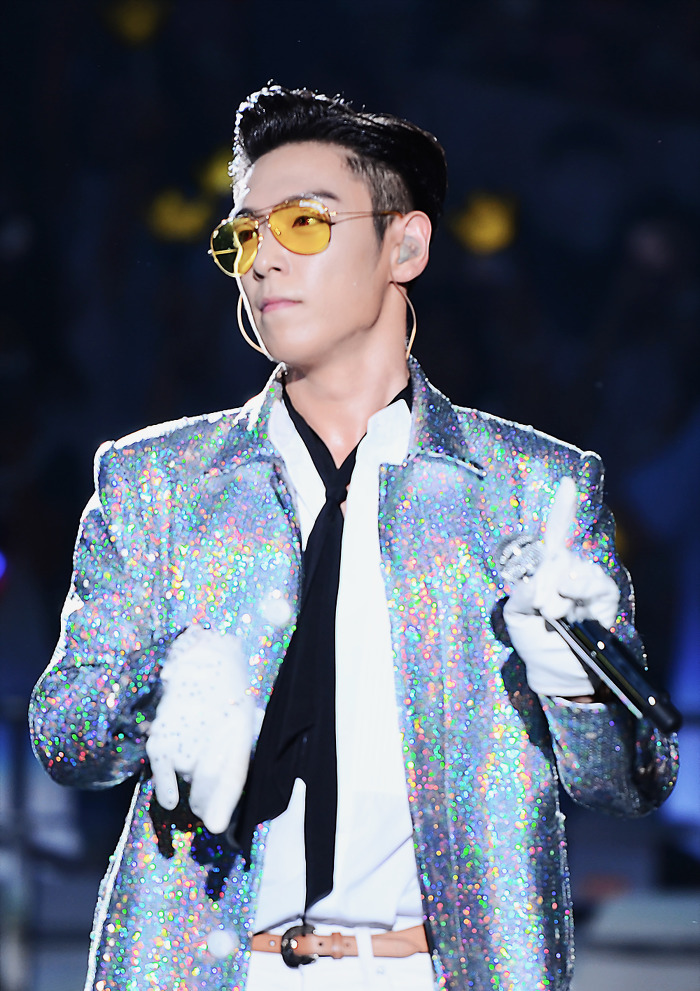
Rapper T.O.P was chosen due to director Hwang Dong-hyuk wanting an actor who had left the industry due to drugs.

Thanos is portrayed by Choi Seung-Hyun, best known by his stage name T.O.P, a former member of the K-pop group BigBang. The character was created before casting, T.O.P receiving the role after Hwang found his "serious" approach. Executive producer Kim Ji-yeon felt this, combined with his talent, made him a good fit. Hwang explained that he wanted to cast someone who stopped working due to drugs, T.O.P retiring from the K-pop industry and leaving BigBang over a marijuana conviction. To get ready for an action scene with actor Yim Si-wan who portrayed Lee Myung-gi, both attended an action school to improve their chemistry together. During this training for the fight scene between the two, T.O.P broke ribs. According to Yim, they stopped filming, but T.O.P wanted to continue, so they resumed. When asked about Thanos' death, Hwang identified him as one of his favorite characters, believing that an "intense" death at the end of season 2 was the perfect time to kill him, and that season 3 will still feel like he is there with how the plot progresses.

== Reception ==
=== Controversy among South Koreans ===
The casting of T.O.P received controversy in South Korea, the actor's face blurred on the Korean show Live This Morning when airing a segment about the show. The casting led to some viewers to believe that Lee Jung-jae, who portrayed Seong Gi-hun and was close to T.O.P, had gotten him the role, a claim that Lee denied. Netflix and Hwang received criticism for this casting for possibly setting a bad precedent. T.O.P was absent for a time from promotional events with the cast. Responding to speculation that he was removed from promotional events over the controversy, Hwang said that they planned to not have him featured from the beginning, wanting T.O.P to be able to talk about his involvement at his own pace. He felt that he had "a lot of guts" for agreeing to do the performance considering his history with drugs, and was surprised that he had still not been forgiven. He also believed that the reaction to his casting would not be reflected outside of Korea due to different legality and opinions on marijuana use in some countries. He also believed that his character may prove popular with younger viewers in Korea.

After release, his acting was criticized, particularly that his vocal and facial performance was out of place, with the quality of his rap having mixed reception. Outside of South Korea, the negative reaction to his casting was criticized by some people, who found it excessive and unreasonable. Hwang argued against the claim that cartoonish characters were not limited to only season 1, comparing him to Jang Deok-su and Han Mi-nyeo, who he said both received similar commentary. He believed that more serious performances have their acting skill recognized more readily in Korea, expressing regret that Thanos' exaggerated character caused people to view his acting ability negatively. Ilgan Sports writer Jeon Hyeong-hwa felt he lacked presence compared to Deok-su from season 1, but argued that he served a different role than Deok-su, who provided tension through his actions. Jeon felt that the reference to the Marvel character was meant to bring together the remaining characters and causing the death of half the remaining cast members, in reference to Thanos' actions in Marvel comics. David A. Tizzard, writing for The Korea Times, discussed how the K-pop industry has anti-fans so he finds the response to the casting unsurprising. Discussing criticism of his portrayal, Tizzard appreciated that offers jokes in between the sadder elements of the show, believing he would fit into a Quentin Tarantino movie. He also felt that T.O.P's treatment from the media over his drug conviction influenced his portrayal of Thanos.

=== International reception ===
Reception to Thanos and his performance was less negative than from South Korean viewers according to Korea Times. A survey held by Netflix about the favorite new character was conducted, with Thanos winning 50 percent of the vote out of 700,000 people. IGN writer Shannon Miller praised T.O.P, stating that he "found a way to imbue pitch-perfect physical comedy, rage, and tragic recklessness" into Thanos, making players "hold their breath in fear and beg for more." The Wrap writer William Goodman found him to be a standout character, finding him "endlessly appealing." Fellow The Wrap writer Kayla Cobb felt he was a standout character among the villains of Squid Game season 2, feeling that he brought an "unhinged jolt of energy" to the season. Men's Health writer Evan Romano felt he was an "incredibly frustrating" character, praising Squid Game for creating this portrayal. Screen Rant writer Amanda Mullen believed that Thanos' death reflected the notion that season 3 would be "the show's darkest yet," arguing that the lack of the comic relief he provided will cause this. Comic Book writer Evan Valentine felt that he represented how poor conditions for the current generation can be, and how even being a celebrity does not protect them from their bad actions. He found the idea of Thanos conceptually unbelievable, he was impressed by how the character was portrayed, particularly how he performs in the games and "poisons" contestants into joining his side.

Despite the more positive reception, he also received criticism from international viewers. Looper writer Mike Bedard called him the worst character in the second season, feeling he did not fit in with the rest of the cast due to how over-the-top he was portrayed. Despite several scenes with Thanos that are similar to Deok-su's, Bedard compared him negatively to season 1 antagonist Jang Deok-su, commenting that while he appreciated that Thanos is not a repeat of Deok-su's character, he wished he was either a "complete psychopath" or sympathetic villain. Collider writer Therese Lacson felt that Thanos, along with much of the cast lacked depth, arguing that the show does not offer an exploration of him as a person, instead caricaturizing him. The Guardian writer Rebecca Nicholson considered him one of the most irritating characters in recent TV series, finding him "cartoonishly awful."
