= Squid Game season 3 =

Season of South Korean television series

Squid Game
- Season 3
- Promotional poster
- Showrunner: Hwang Dong-hyuk
- Starring: Lee Jung-jae; Lee Byung-hun; Yim Si-wan; Kang Ha-neul; Wi Ha-joon; Park Gyu-young; Lee Jin-wook; Park Sung-hoon; Yang Dong-geun; Kang Ae-shim; Jo Yu-ri
- No. of episodes: 6

Release
- Original network: Netflix
- Original release: June 27, 2025

Season chronology
- ← Previous; Season 2

The third and final season of the South Korean dystopian survival thriller television series Squid Game, marketed as Squid Game 3 (Korean: 오징어 게임 3) and created by writer and director Hwang Dong-hyuk, was released on Netflix on June 27, 2025.

The season stars Lee Jung-jae, Lee Byung-hun, Wi Ha-joon, Yim Si-wan, Kang Ha-neul, Park Gyu-young, Park Sung-hoon, Yang Dong-geun, Kang Ae-shim, Jo Yu-ri, Lee David, and Roh Jae-won. In the season, Seong Gi-hun and the players fight for survival in ever-deadlier games. In-ho welcomes the VIPs while his brother Jun-ho continues the search for the island, unaware of a traitor in their midst. The season received positive reviews from critics.

== Episodes ==
No. overall	No. in season	Title	Directed by	Written by	Original release date
17	1	"Keys and Knives"; Transliteration: "Yeolsoewa kal" (Korean: 열쇠와 칼)	Hwang Dong-hyuk	Hwang Dong-hyuk	June 27, 2025
After a failed rebellion, (Note: As shown in the second season episode "Friend or Foe") Kang No-eul non-fatally shoots Player 246, Gyeong-seok, pretending to cooperate with organ traffickers to gain access to their operating room. Seong Gi-hun is returned alive to the dormitory and learns that all the other rebels, except Cho Hyun-ju and Kang Dae-ho, have been executed. A new vote is held and the decision is made to continue the games. Still shaken, Gi-hun blames Dae-ho for the rebellion's failure. The players are then led past the bodies of the hanged rebels and assigned roles for a lethal version of Hide-and-Seek, where armed taggers hunt hiders searching for exits using three types of keys. Before the game begins, Dae-ho confronts Gi-hun over the failed plan, and Geum-ja and Jun-hee switch roles with Myung-gi and Yong-sik to become hiders, while Myung-gi reluctantly teams up with Nam-gyu as a tagger. In the operating room, No-eul kills the traffickers and forces the doctor to stabilize Gyeong-seok. Meanwhile, Jun-ho's team resumes searching for the island with a new drone operator, Woo-seok investigates Captain Park on his own, and Hwang In-ho orders Park to eliminate them if necessary.
18	2	"The Starry Night"; Transliteration: "Byeori binnaneun bame" (Korean: 별이 빛나는 밤에)	Hwang Dong-hyuk	Hwang Dong-hyuk	June 27, 2025
No-eul kills the doctor after Gyeong-seok recovers. In the game's maze, Hyun-ju, Geum-ja, and Jun-hee team up. Myung-gi and Nam-gyu kill several hiders to eliminate attackers as well and increase the prize pool. Seon-nyeo is betrayed by Player 100, Jeong-dae, and killed by Min-su, who hallucinates Se-mi under the influence of Thanos' drugs that Nam-gyu dropped. Jun-hee injures her ankle and goes into labor while Hyun-ju kills several attackers attacking them. Geum-ja helps Jun-hee deliver her baby, but Hyun-ju is later killed by Myung-gi just as she discovers a way out; overcome with guilt, at the sight of Jun-hee and the newborn, Myung-gi walks away. Meanwhile, a vengeful Gi-hun, a tagger, pursues Dae-ho, who confesses to having lied about his military past and betrayed the rebellion out of fear. Enraged, Gi-hun strangles him to death. Moments before the game ends, Yong-sik, having failed to eliminate any hiders, nearly kills Jun-hee, forcing Geum-ja to intervene and stab him, after which the guards shoot him. Blaming himself for the deaths of the rebels, Gi-hun attempts suicide but is stopped by guards.
19	3	"It's Not Your Fault"; Transliteration: "Dangsinui tasi anida" (Korean: 당신의 탓이 아니다)	Hwang Dong-hyuk	Hwang Dong-hyuk	June 27, 2025
VIPs arrive and pose as soldiers to execute eliminated players. During the vote, Geum-ja begs the "O" players to vote "X" but is ignored; she asks Gi-hun to protect Jun-hee and her newborn daughter, and after he refuses, she hangs herself out of guilt over her son's death. Jun-ho searches the island after finding the cliff where In-ho shot him. At Captain Park's house, Woo-seok discovers money, a guard uniform, and a photo linking Park to the Recruiter, realizing Park's involvement before being arrested. After Geum-ja's death, Gi-hun agrees to help Jun-hee and her baby in the next game, Jump Rope, where players must cross a bridge while avoiding a swinging rope. Min-su triggers the game by throwing Thanos's necklace, leading Nam-gyu to jump and die. The VIPs rule that Jun-hee's baby counts as a player; Gi-hun crosses safely with the baby, followed by Player 096, who then shoves others. Meanwhile, a Masked Officer, threatened by No-eul, discovers Gyeong-seok posing as a soldier.
20	4	"222"	Hwang Dong-hyuk	Hwang Dong-hyuk	June 27, 2025
During the game, Player 096 blocks the path and is killed by Gi-hun in self-defense after refusing to move. Myung-gi approaches Jun-hee, who rejects him for killing Hyun-ju and reveals her injured foot. As time runs out, Jun-hee entrusts her baby to Gi-hun and sacrifices herself. The VIPs allow the baby to remain in the game as Player 222. Gyeong-seok and No-eul escape the island but are pursued by guards. Back in the dormitory, the announcement that the baby replaces Jun-hee angers some players, who attempt to harm the child but are stopped by guards; from this point on, assaults outside games are banned. Jeong-dae's group plans to eliminate Gi-hun, the baby, and Min-su in the next game, with Myung-gi pretending to cooperate. Before the final round, In-ho summons Gi-hun and proposes a secret deal to remove the remaining players, revealing he was secretly Oh Young-il. Elsewhere, Woo-seok informs Jun-ho of Captain Park's role, and Park is mortally wounded after killing most of Jun-ho's team, admitting the truth before dying. Under threat from the Masked Officer, No-eul returns to the island after ensuring Gyeong-seok's escape.
21	5	"○△□"	Hwang Dong-hyuk	Hwang Dong-hyuk	June 27, 2025
Gi-hun considers In-ho's proposal to kill the remaining players but, after a memory of Kang Sae-byeok, ultimately refuses. In-ho recalls killing players during the 2015 games under Oh Il-nam's orders. The next day, Gi-hun, Myung-gi, and the other finalists, including the baby, advance to the final game. No-eul returns to the island, forces the Officer to erase all digital records of Gyeong-seok, then kills him and destroys the remaining physical player records. The final game, Sky Squid Game, requires players to push opponents off elevated platforms across three rounds. Min-su is pushed off in the first round; in the second, Myung-gi pushes Player 336 and reveals he is the baby's biological father. Jeong-dae's group attempts to use Player 039 as a sacrifice, leading to a fight in which Players 203 and 353 are killed; Jeong-dae is then pushed off by Myung-gi, and Player 039 commits suicide. Elsewhere, Jun-ho rescues Gyeong-seok and kills the guards sent after him.
22	6	"Humans Are..."; Transliteration: "Sarameun..." (Korean: 사람은...)	Hwang Dong-hyuk	Hwang Dong-hyuk	June 27, 2025
After destroying the records room, No-eul considers suicide but finally does not. With only Gi-hun, Myung-gi, and the baby remaining, Myung-gi plans to win by taking the baby and throwing it off before Gi-hun can cross, but Gi-hun manages to cross. A struggle follows and Myung-gi falls to his death, which does not count since the game has not officially started. Gi-hun then begins the game and chooses to sacrifice himself, throwing himself off the platform. His death shocks the VIPs and leads In-ho to rescue the baby as the island is evacuated before its destruction, as the coast guard was approaching. Jun-ho, the VIPs, No-eul, and the staff escape in time. Six months later, Gyeong-seok reunites with his daughter and meets No-eul, who plans to travel to China to find her own daughter; Cheol reunites with his mother; and Woo-seok is released from prison and plans to reopen Gi-hun's fortified hotel. In-ho leaves the baby and the prize money with Jun-ho, then visits Gi-hun's daughter in Los Angeles to inform her of his death and give her his blooded tracksuit and remaining winnings, later witnessing an American recruiter playing ddakji, revealing the games' existence in America.

== Cast and characters ==
Numbers in parentheses denote the character's assigned player number in the Squid Game universe.

=== Main ===
- Lee Jung-jae as Seong Gi-hun (성기훈, [sʌŋɡihun], 456)
- Lee Byung-hun as Hwang In-ho / the Front Man (황인호, [hwaŋinho])
- Yim Si-wan as Lee Myung-gi / "MG Coin" (이명기; [i.mjʌŋ.gi], 333)
- Kang Ha-neul as Kang Dae-ho (강대호; [kaŋ.dɛ.βo], 388)
- Wi Ha-joon as Hwang Jun-ho (황준호, [hwaŋdʑunho])
- Park Gyu-young as Kang No-eul (강노을; [kaŋ.no.ɯɭ])
- Lee Jin-wook as Park Gyeong-seok (박경석; [pak̚.k͈jʌŋ.sːʌk̚], 246)
- Park Sung-hoon as Cho Hyun-ju (조현주; [tɕo.ʝʌn.dʑu], 120)
- Yang Dong-geun as Park Yong-sik (박용식; [pak̚.joŋ.ɕːik̚], 007)
- Kang Ae-shim as Jang Geum-ja (장금자; [tɕaŋ.gɯm.dʑa], 149)
- Jo Yu-ri as Kim Jun-hee (김준희; [kim.dʑun.ɦɰi], 222)

=== Special guest stars ===
- Park Hee-soon as the Masked Officer
- Jung Ho-yeon as Kang Sae-byeok (강새벽; [kaŋ.sːɛ.bjʌk̚], 067 of the first season)
- Cate Blanchett as the American Recruiter

=== Recurring ===
- Song Young-chang as Im Jeong-dae (임정대, 100)
- Chae Kook-hee as Seon-nyeo (선녀, 044)
- Lee David as Park Min-su (박민수, 125)
- Roh Jae-won as Nam-gyu (남규, 124)
- Choi Gwi-hwa as Kim Gi-min (203)
- Lee Gyu-hoe as Kim Yun-tae (353)
- Park Jin-woo as Lee Seung-won (336)
- Woo Jung-kook as Player 039
- Oh Dal-su as Sea Captain Park Yeong-gil
- Jeon Seok-ho as Choi Woo-seok
- Sung Do-hyun as Kim, the mercenary leader
- Lee Sung-woo as Kim Yeong-sam (김영삼, 226)
- David Sayers as VIP #1
- Jane Wong as VIP #2
- Bryan Bucco as VIP #3
- Jordan Lambertoni as VIP #4
- Kevin Yorn as VIP #5

=== Guest cast ===
- Choi Seung-hyun as Choi Su-bong / "Thanos" (최수봉 / 타노스, 230)
- Won Ji-an as Se-mi (세미, 380)
- Lee Seo-hwan as Park Jung-bae (박정배; [pak̚.t͈ɕʌŋ.bɛ], 390)
- Lee Suk as Player 096
- Jo Si-nae as Park Mi-hwa (박미화, 006)
- Kim Geum-sun as Player 349
- Cho Ah-in as Seong Ga-yeong, Gi-hun's daughter
- Park Hye-jin as Sang-woo's mother and Kang Cheol's adoptive mother
- Park Si-wan as Kang Cheol, the younger brother of Kang Sae-byeok
- Choi Jae-sup as Park Man-cheol, a broker involved with Sae-byeok and No-eul

Additionally, creator Hwang Dong-hyuk makes a cameo appearance.

== Production ==
=== Development ===
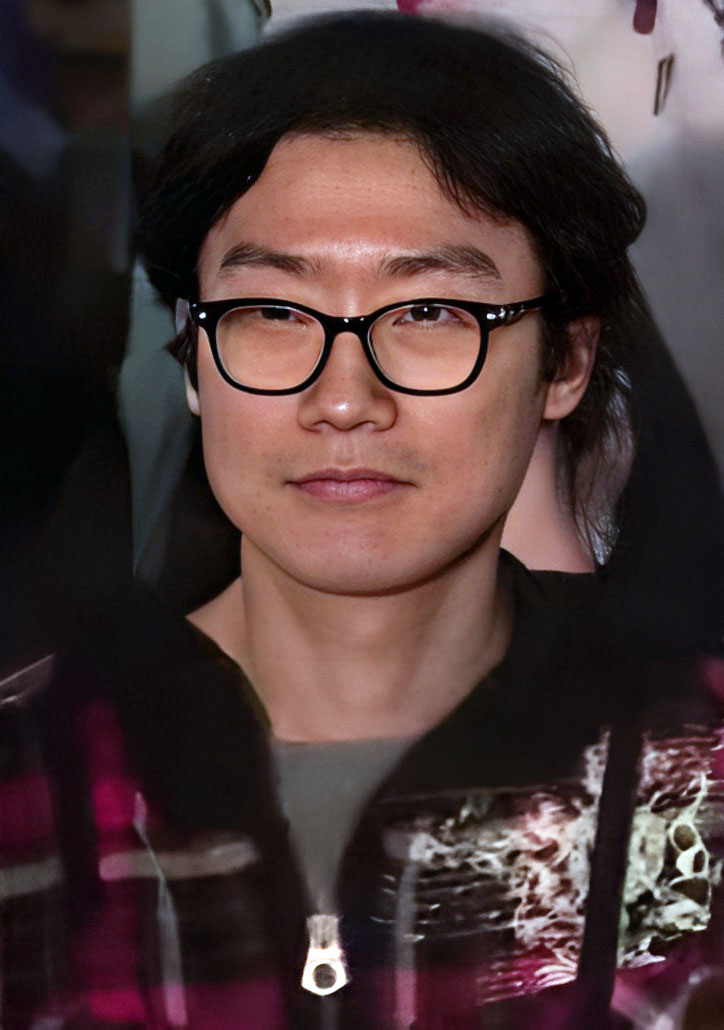
Series creator and director Hwang Dong-hyuk

Hwang stated in December 2021 that he was discussing a third season of Squid Game with Netflix. The third season was confirmed after season two aired. When Hwang was thinking about the idea for the ending of season three, he thought of season three as the finale. He believed that with that story, he was able to tell everything that he wanted to tell through the story of Squid Game and also in the perspective of Seong Gi-hun as a character, and that he doesn't need any further stories from here.

=== Writing ===
Hwang originally envisioned the second and third seasons as one, but split them up after feeling there were too many episodes for one season. According to Hwang, at the beginning of the third season, Gi-hun will once again be a changed man compared to the previous two seasons and "at a very critical crossroads". The season will also reveal how Hwang In-ho became the Front Man. Cheol-su, Young-hee's giant robot doll "boyfriend", was introduced in the post-credits scene of the second season's final episode and will appear in season three alongside a new game. Speaking about the season, Hwang talks about how the emphasis this season places "on how [people] have to preserve their humanity amidst this intense competition" but introduces games "that could really show the lowest bottom of human beings" wanting "very intense games to bring out the bottom parts of human nature." He also talked about how the changes Gi-hun and Myung-gi go through are "dramatic" and how Jun-hee's baby will be very relevant "not just for Jun-hee, but [also] for the fate of everyone inside."

Hwang had originally written the season to end with Gi-hun being able to escape the games, winning or not, along with others, and going to see his daughter, but felt this ending "didn't line up for me" given the situation in the contemporary world. He altered the story to include Jun-hee and her baby as to allow Gi-hun to sacrifice himself for the baby's future, which Hwang saw as a symbol of the next generation.

=== Casting ===
Lee Jung-jae and Lee Byung-hun reprise their roles as Gi-hun and the Front Man. As the games of the second season continue, Wi Ha-joon, Kang Ha-neul, Park Sung-hoon, Yim Si-wan, Yang Dong-geun, Park Gyu-young, Jo Yu-ri, Kang Ae-shim, Lee David, and Roh Jae-won reprise their roles.

Cate Blanchett makes a cameo appearance at the end of the final episode, she takes the role of a recruiter for an American version of the games. Hwang said that "having a woman as a recruiter would be more dramatic and intriguing", and with Blanchett, "We needed someone who could dominate the screen with just one or two words, which is exactly what she did[...] If Gong Yoo is the Korean Recruiter, I thought she would be the perfect fit as the American Recruiter, bringing a short but gripping and impactful ending to the story." Lee considered the scene to reflect on the nature of the Squid Games, that "despite all of the noble efforts of so many people, the world still continues as it was before". Though some media outlets like Variety and The Hollywood Reporter believed that this final scene may help to set up the planned America production of Squid Game that David Fincher has been slated to direct, Hwang said that he did not plan this scene to make any such connection, having heard no official word about the Fincher version.

=== Filming ===
Filming for the third season started in July 2023 and ended in June 2024, as it was filmed back-to-back along with the second season.

=== Post-production ===
The editing portion for season three was "nearly done" by November 2024.

=== Music ===
The soundtrack for the third season was composed by Jung Jae-il, who returned from the previous two seasons. The score was released digitally on June 27, 2025, alongside the series premiere. It features a darker, more orchestral variation of the "Way Back then" theme, reflecting the finality of the season.

== Release ==
The season was released on Netflix on June 27, 2025. In its first three days, it became the biggest-ever television launch for Netflix, getting more than 60.1 million views and more than 368.4 million hours viewed. According to information from Netflix, Netflix Tudum and Flixpatrol, the season ranked at No. 1 in 93 countries, making history as the first Netflix series to debut No. 1 in every available country, and remained at that top spot for a whole week. In less than two weeks, the season reached more than 100 million views and became the third most-watched non-English Netflix show, right beside Squid Game season 1 and season 2.

At the end of its run, based on total views in the first 91 days of release, Squid Game season 3 reached 145.8 million views, notably by remaining 9 consecutive weeks in the top 10 most popular non-English seasons. The season thus became the fourth Netflix's most-watched series of all time, behind Squid Game season 1 (265.2 million), Wednesday season 1 (252.1 million) and Squid Game season 2 (192.6 million), and surpassing the show Adolescence (142.6 million), released the same year.

=== Marketing ===
To promote the final season, Netflix launched a global campaign titled "The Final Game". In June 2025, replica "recruitment" stations were set up in major cities including New York City, Paris, Tokyo, and Seoul, where fans could play non-lethal versions of the games featured in the show. The final trailer was released on June 12, 2025, and accumulated over 40 million views in its first 24 hours.

== Reception ==
Professional ratings
Aggregate scores
Source	Rating
Metacritic	67/100
Rotten Tomatoes	78%
Review scores
Source	Rating
Metro	4.5/5 stars
The Telegraph	4/5 stars
The Guardian	3/5 stars

On the review aggregator website Rotten Tomatoes, 78% of 79 critics' reviews are positive, with an average rating of 7/10. The website's consensus reads: "The games reach a grim crescendo in this climactic third season, repeating familiar beats but with a ruthlessness that drives creator Hwang Dong-hyuk's themes home." Metacritic, which uses a weighted average, assigned the season a score of 67 out of 100, based on 26 critics, indicating "generally favorable" reviews.

Time also gave a positive review of the series, commenting that the series was back to its "brutal best" that "cuts to the bone" with its emotional depth and character arcs, as well as the themes touched on by Hwang in the series.

Although professional critical reviews remained mostly positive; it has been noted that audience ratings and reactions toward the season were mixed, with particular criticism being aimed at the series ending and the timing of certain character deaths.
