= Seong Gi-hun =

Squid Game protagonist

- Squid Game character
- Lee Jung-jae as Seong Gi-hun in season 1
- First appearance: "Red Light, Green Light" (2021)
- Last appearance: "Humans Are..." (2025)
- Created by: Hwang Dong-hyuk
- Portrayed by: Lee Jung-jae (adult); Kim Yeon-ung (child)
- Voiced by: Greg Chun (English)
- Allies: Cho Sang-woo; Kang Sae-byeok; Ali Abdul; Han Mi-nyeo; Ji-yeong; Park Jung-bae; Kim Jun-hee; Park Gyeong-seok; Cho Hyun-ju; Jang Geum-ja; Park Yong-sik; Kim Young-mi; Hwang Jun-ho; Park Min-su; Choi Woo-seok; Kim Jeong-rae
- Enemies: Hwang In-ho; Oh Il-nam; The Recruiter; Masked Officer; Kang No-eul; Im Jeong-dae; Kim Yeong-sam; Seon-nyeo; Kang Dae-ho; Lee Myung-gi; Jang Deok-su; Thanos; Kim Gi-min; Lee Seung-won; Kim Yun-tae; Player 096

In-universe information
- Alias: Player 456
- Nationality: South Korean

Korean name
- Hangul: 성기훈
- RR: Seong Gihun
- MR: Sŏng Kihun

Seong Gi-hun (Korean: 성기훈; [sʌŋ.ɡi.βun]), also known as Player 456, is the main major character and the protagonist of the South Korean dystopian survival thriller television series Squid Game, made for Netflix. He was created by series creator Hwang Dong-hyuk and portrayed by Lee Jung-jae, who was cast out of a desire to affect his reputation as a cool actor and show the humanity behind his role. Gi-hun took multiple aspects from Hwang's life, including his neighborhood, his childhood friend's name, aspects of his uncle, and his own struggles with gambling and failure. When designing his character for season 2, Hwang aimed to make him a Don Quixote–like character, revolting recklessly against the system. Lee found him to be the most "heartbreaking" character he has portrayed. He is voiced in the English dub by Greg Chun.

Gi-hun was a divorced former chauffeur and gambling addict who joined in a secret life-or-death contest consisting of six children's games where he competes with 455 other players for a cash prize of up to 45.6 billion won after incurring significant debts from gambling and unemployment. During participation, he makes allies with various other participants, including Ali Abdul, Cho Sang-woo, Kang Sae-byeok and Oh Il-nam whilst making enemies with Jang Deok-su, Byeong-gi, The Recruiter and indirectly with Hwang In-ho. Following his regretful victory in season 1, he returned as a participant in the games of the second and third in an attempt to end them. He makes allies with various other participants, including Kang Dae-ho, Park Jung-bae, Park Yong-sik, Cho Hyun-ju, Jang Geum-ja, Kim Jun-hee, Park Gyeong-seok and Hwang In-ho whilst making enemies with Im Jeong-dae, Thanos, Seon-nyeo, Kim Yeong-sam, and briefly with the Masked Officer and Kang No-eul.

Gi-hun was well received as a character in season 1, with Lee winning multiple awards for his performance, including a Screen Actors Guild Award and an Emmy. Critics discussed the parallels between his life and real-world problems in South Korea, including the 1997 Asian financial crisis. His season 2 and 3 portrayals were more mixed, with critics feeling his character's actions were frustrating and made little sense. Despite these criticisms, Lee has been praised for his ability to shift from a lighthearted character to a darker one in the second and third seasons.

== Appearances ==
=== Squid Game season 1 ===
Seong Gi-hun first appeared in the first season as the protagonist, introduced stealing money from his mother to gamble on horses with Park Jung-bae for a gift for his daughter's birthday. He ends up losing the winnings however after being pickpocketed by a woman while fleeing loan sharks, led by Kim Jeong-rae. Later, at a train station, he was approached by a man in a suit, who offered Gi-hun 100,000 won if he could beat him in a game of ddakji. He eventually wins, getting the won and an invitation to participate in Squid Game. He joined as player 456 of 456, meeting various people, including an old man, the pickpocket, and his childhood friend, Cho Sang-woo. The players participate in a game of Red Light, Green Light, learning that losing results in death. He nearly falls, only to be caught by Ali Abdul, who crosses the finish line with Gi-hun. It is then revealed that the winner of all six games will receive a cash prize of up to 45.6 billion won, but a slim majority of players vote to leave the game, Gi-hun included. Back home, he returns with Il-nam in a convenience store and later Jung-bae for money. He then reports the game to the police, but they are not convinced; police detective Hwang Jun-ho asks him about the games as his brother had a card similar to the one given to Gi-hun when he was told about the games and has disappeared. Gi-hun declines to help Jun-ho with the matter. He discovers his mother in the hospital, unable to get treatment; he attempts to get a loan from his ex-wife, learning she and their daughter are moving to the United States. Desperate for money, with no other options, he rejoins the Squid Game.

The second game prompts players to choose a shape; Gi-hun chose umbrella, only learning afterward they had to remove the shape from a flat snack, Gi-hun having picked the hardest one. He eventually wins by licking it out. During the interim, it is discovered that killing during breaks is permissible, prompting a gangster named Jang Deok-su to go on a massacre with his allies on other players. He rescues the pickpocket, and learns her name to be Kang Sae-byeok. The lights turn back on, and the killing is made to stop. They then participate in a game of tug-of-war, Gi-hun allying with Sae-byeok, the old man, Ali, Sang-woo, and five others. After winning thanks to the old man's advice, they barricade themselves for the night, taking shifts keeping watch and dissuading Deok-su from attacking by making him feel paranoid. During the night, he experiences PTSD and remembers his co-worker being killed by police during a strike.

In the fourth game, they are told to pair up with another player to play with, Gi-hun choosing to partner with the old man. They then learn that the objective is to win your opponent's marbles. Gi-hun struggles with bad luck, but starts to lie during the game in order to win. He learns that the old man knew he was lying, but let him win anyway, giving his name as Oh Il-nam and thanking him for helping him have fun before his apparent execution. During the next game, which is glass stepping stones, Gi-hun is shocked to see Sang-woo kill a man to ensure that he survives, and learns that Sae-byeok was injured during this game. The three are the only remaining survivors, with Gi-hun stopped from killing Sang-woo by Sae-byeok, each of them promising to take care of the other's family if the other dies. She is ultimately killed by Sang-woo to keep her and Gi-hun from voting to leave the game, and the two are sent to fight to the death in the final game. Sang-woo is defeated, but Gi-hun asks to vote to leave, not wanting to kill him, prompting Sang-woo to take his own life so Gi-hun would win the money by default.

Gi-hun is sent back by the Front Man and returns home then discovering his mother has died, and is unable to spend the money due to guilt. He later receives an invitation card from Il-nam, who reveals that he is the mastermind of Squid Game, wanting to relieve his boredom from being so rich. Il-nam challenges Gi-hun to a wager over whether a drunk in the snow would be rescued, only for Gi-hun to win as Il-nam passes away. Some time later, Gi-hun changes his appearance by having red hair. He then takes Sae-byeok's brother out of an orphanage and brings him to Sang-woo's mother, along with a portion of the prize money. On his way to his flight to see his daughter, he sees the same man in a suit from the train station with another man and gives chase. The man in the suit is gone, but he takes the card from the person who received it and calls the number. He states his intent to rejoin the games and end them once and for all and finding the Front Man, opting to not board the plane.

=== Squid Game season 2 ===
In the second season, set three years later, Gi-hun was paying his former loan sharks, with Choi Woo-seok and Kim Jeong-rae to hunt down the recruiter of the games, eventually tracking him down to a run-down hotel room. The recruiter challenges Gi-hun to a game of Russian roulette, both casting aspersions at the other. The recruiter challenges him to pull the trigger twice on him, saying that he would prove to be "trash"; Gi-hun pulls the trigger on himself, making the same challenge to the recruiter, who ultimately shoots himself. Gi-hun then joins forces with Hwang Jun-ho and the mercenaries. He plans with others to track down the Front Man, having a false tooth with a tracker in it. He was invited into a limo, where he asks to be put into the game so he could take it down, with the Front Man accepting this, becoming Player 456 again. As he wakes up along with other players, a shaman named Seon-nyeo approaches him and scolds him with the fate of the previous players. He learns of a new rule that players vote to stay or leave after every game now and that his friend, Park Jung-bae, had joined the game, telling him to stick close to him. During Red Light, Green Light, he discovers that the tracker was removed, preventing his allies from locating him. He explains the consequences of losing to the other players, taking care to instruct them when to freeze. The other players only realize the consequences once the first player dies. Gi-hun then instructs the players to form a line with the taller players in front. Thanos pushes players off and Gi-hun and the players are forced to run instead towards the finish line as the time almost runs out. He crosses the finish line, but notices a player who had been shot asking for help. He, alongside Cho Hyun-ju, help him cross, though he is killed anyway by Kang No-eul, a North Korean defector and Squid Game soldier. The players stare are the closing ceiling whilst Gi-hun fails to locate No-eul in time.

This time around, everyone participates in a vote to stay or leave after every game, receiving an X for those leaving and an O for those staying. During the vote, Gi-hun loudly declares that he has participated in the games before, inviting skepticism. Gi-hun is then approached by Im Jeong-dae and Thanos about him being in the games and wanting advice to win. By a slim majority, the players are made to remain, after Player 001 – Hwang In-ho, the true identity of the Front Man infiltrating the games as a mole to sabotage Gi-hun's plans – votes to stay. Numerous players seek out his input for the next game, though Gi-hun is unsure about whether it will be the same game, Dalgona. When the O team, Im Jeong-dae and In-ho confronts Gi-hun, he earns In-ho's trust after fighting Thanos and Nam-gyu, saving Lee Myung-gi's life. In the next game, Jeong-dae and the O Team find out it's a different game, not Dalgona. From there, Gi-hun is insulted by everyone who opposes him. The players are told to form a group of five, with Gi-hun's group consisting of himself, Jung-bae, a former Marine named Kang Dae-ho, a pregnant woman named Kim Jun-hee, and In-ho (calling himself "Oh Young-il"). They are made to have their legs tied side-by-side, each tasked with playing one of five games, each completing their game and crossing the finish line. Another vote is held, with a noticeable majority of players voting to remain, including Jung-bae, who previously voted to leave. They participate in the third game, Mingle, with Gi-hun and his friends allying with Hyun-ju, Jang Geum-ja, Park Yong-sik, Kim Young-mi and Park Gyeong-seok. The first round, Seon-nyeo reminds him about the previous games and him being the lone survivor. The following of Young-mi's death and the aftermath of Mingle, players proceeded to hold another vote. The vote ends up a tie due to players switching sides especially Park Min-su, forcing them to hold a vote the next day. After the bathroom fight with the X Team and O Team, resulting Thanos's death, Gi-hun realizes that the game intends for the players to kill each other, warning his group to hide during this until the soldiers enter so they can steal their guns and take over the facility. The O team, led by Nam-gyu for the riot, to avenge Thanos, starts the riot and Gi-hun and the others hid as the O and X Team massacres each other.

After the riot is ended, the guards, sent by the Masked Officer to conclude the killing and the group members pretend to be dead, allowing them to take the guards off guard and steal their weapons, killing them. Gi-hun with Jung-bae, Dae-ho, Hyun-ju and Gyeong-seok along with others joining the rebellion, collects the guns and ammo, leaving the dorm room with a hostage to tell them where to go. He and Jung-bae go to the command room and the Masked Officer while the others deal with the soldiers, fighting soldiers of their own along the way. In-ho eventually takes two people with him to help ambush the soldiers from behind and assist Gi-hun and Jung-bae, only to kill the two he brought and fake "Young-il"'s death while radioing Gi-hun. Gi-hun and Jung-bae surrender, and In-ho, now dressed as the Front Man, comes with several other guards and the Masked Officer, executes Jung-bae. The soldiers hold down a horrified Gi-hun and the fight is over.

=== Squid Game season 3 ===
In the third season, Gi-hun is returned to the dormitory in a coffin where he wakes up to see players looking at him. He is comforted by his friends and Cho Hyun-ju asks him where Jung-bae is. Gi-hun grapples with the trauma of his failed rebellion, tries to get the soldiers to shoot him but is pinned down and ends up not being allowed to vote while being chained to a bunk. He was then bullied and framed by Im Jeong-dae and others about the rebellion. As Seon-nyeo mocks him, Gi-hun attempts to kill her, only to be stop by her followers due to being handcuffed. During the fourth game, "Hide and Seek", still in a state of shock, he is made a seeker and kills Dae-ho for causing the rebellion to fail, only to later realize that his failure also led to the rebellion's failure. He nearly committed suicide, but was stopped by the guards. During his lowest point, Geum-ja requested Gi-hun to protect Jun-hee and her newborn baby, who gave birth during the fourth game. Though he initially refuses, he regains his resolve and begins to do so after witnessing Geum-ja's suicide following her guilt and shame of killing her son. He still wasn't allowed to vote, so the next game proceeded. In the fifth game, Gi-hun and several others witnessed Nam-gyu's death, forcing himself to go next with the baby. He effortlessly passes the jump rope bridge with the child and encouraged others to go in and pass through. While he was helping others, another player attempted to kill others by pushing them off at the end so that he and Gi-hun can win the money but Gi-hun prevented him from doing so and they fight. Gi-hun gouges his eye and throws him off. As other players passed, time was running out and tried to get Jun-hee but failed to save Jun-hee, who sacrificed herself due to her injuries and time limit.

After the child inherited Jun-hee's number as a player by the VIPs, most of the remaining players began scheming to eliminate the newborn to increase the prize pool. The last game was voted to continue and only Gi-hun and Park Min-su voted to terminate whilst the other continued. Hwang In-ho, who reveals himself as The Front Man to Gi-hun, makes a proposition to kill the remaining players in their sleep to ensure his and the child's safety, using the knife where he was given the same proposition by Oh Il-nam. Although Gi-hun was tempted, he was stopped by a vision of Kang Sae-byeok, who reminded him that it isn't the person he wanted to be, and rejects the proposition, surprising In-ho.

In the final game of squid, near its climax, the first round, Gi-hun is targeted by Im Jeong-dae unaware that they changed their target to Min-su, resulting in the latter's death. In the second round Gi-hun gets to know that Lee Myung-gi, Player 333, is the baby's father and together with him fights with Im Jeong-dae and the other finalists with the knife In-ho gave him to protect the baby, he then engages in a fierce battle with Myung-gi in the third and final round and emerges victorious, with the two falling from the platform, Gi-hun managing to hold on to the edge whilst Myung-gi falls to his death. However, after recovering himself, Gi-hun realizes that the two of them neglected to press the button which would initiate the game, meaning Myung-gi's death has been in vain. The VIPs mistakenly believe he has won, as the last competitor was Jun-hee's baby daughter. However, he chooses to jump off the platform to fulfill a promise he made to Jun-hee. He declares in his final words that the players were humans, not horses, and jumps off the platform, saving the baby and disproving In-ho's cynical philosophy. His sacrifice stuns the VIPs, and inspires No-eul, who was close to committing suicide after killing the Masked Officer and finding out the whereabout of her husband and child, to continue living. In-ho rescues the baby and leaves as the island's bombs detonate, fulfilling Gi-hun's wish to destroy the Squid Game and saving the baby and indirectly Gyeong-seok, who had survived by No-eul from the Masked Officer after the revolt.

Six months after his death, in May 2025, In-ho meets Gi-hun's daughter, Seong Ga-yeong in Los Angeles, where he gives her a black box with the games logo containing Gi-hun's blood stained Player 456 uniform and a debit card containing Gi-hun's remaining winnings in the first game.

== Concept and creation ==
Seong Gi-hun was created by series creator Hwang Dong-hyuk, and portrayed by Lee Jung-jae. Hwang stated that Lee always looked cool, and he had a desire to "ruin" him, as well as a desire to express the humanity derived from his "cool" acting. Lee's agency, upon seeing the script for season 1, advised against him taking the role, believing that Gi-hun was "too big of a loser" for him to portray. He chose to take the role after reading the script for himself, feeling that it was more than just a "typical survival game story" and enjoying the theme of the characters "struggles and emotions." The character was named after Hwang's childhood friend of the same name. Hwang stated that he put himself into Gi-hun's character, citing a failed movie that saw him unable to make money, and needing to rely on his mother like Gi-hun. Other similar traits included his interest in betting on horse races and growing up in the same neighborhood as Gi-hun. He also included aspects of his uncle, who caused trouble for Hwang's grandmother. His background of having organized as a factory worker opposing mass layoffs was inspired by the SsangYong Motor labor strike of 2009. His player number of 456, being the last among all the players, was given to him as a reflection of his social standing.

It was speculated that Gi-hun's red hair in the first-season finale was meant to reflect that he would become a guard in the second season, a theory that Hwang denied. He clarified that it was meant to symbolize his "rage" and his inability to become the person he used to be. He also stated that he thought about what Gi-hun would not get at a salon. Hwang struggled over the ending of the first season, unsure which of two endings to choose between him staying or leaving. He ultimately chose to have him stay because he felt that him leaving would take away from the question of the series.

When developing the second season, Hwang knew he wanted it to start from the end of the first season, and be about Gi-hun's attempts to stop the games. He also wanted the season to end with his attempts to end in failure, losing his best friend due to his actions, wanting to see how he would progress from there. Writing Gi-hun, Hwang stated that he wanted to portray him as a Don Quixote-type character, wanting him to grow from an immature character to fighter who recklessly challenges the system. He stated that, like many other revolutionaries, becomes frustrated with the revolution and loses sight of his good intentions. He cited a scene where the Front Man agreed to help him in his revolution after making clear that he could sacrifice others for his goal, stating that he helped because he realized that Gi-hun had begun to fall apart. The third season will center around the battle between Gi-hun and the Front Man, and be the end of Gi-hun's story.

Lee identified Gi-hun's as the most "heartbreaking" role he's portrayed. He described him as "frustratingly stubborn and a selfish figure at decisive moments," and believed that he's an important character, stating that society needed people who could "act on their conscience and do what's right, even when it's challenging." He felt that his "inherent goodness" is what caused him to survive the first season. Lee stated that he developed his second season portrayal based on his red-haired appearance in the first season, stating he believed he was already a completely different person then and wondered whether he can ever be the same person again. Lee described him as three-dimensional, stating that Gi-hun in the third season will experience major changes as he did in the second season.

He is voiced in the English dub by Greg Chun.

== Reception ==
=== Season 1 ===
Seong Gi-hun has been received generally well in the first season of Squid Game. Teen Vogue writer Jae-ha Kim discussed how the 1997 Asian financial crisis influenced Gi-hun's story progression, particularly the loss of his job and the lack of education denying him opportunities, which she believed led him to taking predatory loans to survive. Salon writer Melanie McFarland felt that Gi-hun's actions, including draining his mother's bank account for gambling, represented how he, like other characters, fit into roles of either "monetary carnivore or scavenger." She also stated that Gi-hun's story is a sad one, arguing that he followed the "bootstrapping myth to the letter by working hard and playing by the rules" without anything to show for it. Authors Yavuz Akyıldız and Elif Şeşen argued that Gi-hun's decision to not use the money and "leads a miserable, depressive, and chaotic life" was a representation of the idea that the game cannot have a winner, stating that the economic structure of society leaves people "lonely and abandoned." Polygon writer Jenna Stoeber felt that Sae-byeok should have won, believing early on that she would be the one to survive, either through winning or escaping. She believed that battle royale stories typically would see characters like Sae-byeok, who have "skills and defiance." She argued that Gi-hun, meanwhile, played by the rules and complied with the boundaries of the games, noting the scene where Il-nam and he watched to see if a drunken man in the streets would be rescued or not. She stated that he has the ability to save him but chooses not to, questioning whether he would learn to understand that he does not have to follow rules that are stacked against him.

Lee was nominated for multiple awards for his performance of Gi-hun, including a Golden Globe, Emmy, and Screen Actors Guild Award, the latter two he won.

=== Season 2 ===
Lee Jung-jae's performance of Gi-hun's season 2 character shift was praised by critics.

IGN writer Alex Zalben drew comparisons between Gi-hun and the people behind Squid Game, arguing that the way he commands the people he hires to find the Recruiter mirrors the controlling nature of the games. He also believed that Gi-hun's "seeming heroism" is self-centered, that it is done for redemption more than for the good of others. Gi-hun's development in season 2 was well received by Gizmodo writers Germain Lussier and Cheryl Eddy, praising actor Lee Jung-jae for managing to capture his shift into a character with "darker intensity" who is struggling with survivor's guilt. Collider writer Therese Lacson praised Lee's performance, particularly comparing his character at the beginning of season 2 to the end, and commented that he now filled the same role that Sang-woo had. Discussing Film writer James Crooks felt that Lee had a rare talent "outside of the A-list stars" in his performance of Gi-hun in season 2, calling the performance "phenomenal." Entertainment Weekly writer Kristen Baldwin praised Lee's shift from season 1 to season 2, commenting about how going from the "wide-eyed, terrified, and intermittently goofy" character with an "endearing levity" to the "trauma-hardened, grimly determined" was "beautifully" done by Lee.

The Hollywood Reporter writer Daniel Fienberg felt that, compared to his performance in season 1, where Lee acted with "live-wire dexterity" and being big in both his portrayal of Gi-hun's comedy and trauma, his "one-note haunted aspect" in season 2, while well performed, the character is less interesting in season 2. Looper writer Akos Peterbencze found Gi-hun's strategy underwhelming, stating that even though he was "far from the smartest character" in the first season, his "cluelessness and naivety" felt unrealistic for someone so dedicated. He expressed frustration watching him lose his confidence, finding it repetitive. Hankyung writer Kim Ji-won felt that Gi-hun's character in season 2 was not convincing, feeling that his decision to sacrifice people for the greater good made viewers side with the Front Man. Kim also felt frustrated that he couldn't identify that the Front Man was Player 001, feeling that the signs were obvious. Commenting on the reaction to Gi-hun's actions in season 2, which were described as frustrating, Lee expressed regret that he did not do better in the role, but believed that people's doubts would be resolved by the release of season 3.

=== Season 3 ===
Gi-hun's portrayal in the final season received mixed responses, with some reviewers lauding the end of his character arc as a satisfying conclusion to his story, while other reviewers indicated his development to be inconsistent with what was previously established in earlier seasons. Nick Bythrow of Screen Rant stated that, in spite of Gi-hun's dark shift in character in response to the trauma and carnage of playing the games, he still felt satisfied with how his story ended, as the conflict between Gi-hun and In-ho, continued to serve as "a compelling anchor for the story." Bythrow also appreciated how Gi-hun was able to overcome the hopelessness and despair of his failed rebellion of the previous season, with this emotional battle being indicative of the overall ideological conflict between Gi-hun and In-ho.

However, Emma Vine of Loud and Clear felt mixed on Gi-hun's character in the final season, sharing that while she appreciated how Gi-hun was forced to face "his morals as a character in a somewhat effective way," many of his actions in response to his moral quandaries led to "out-of-character" moments that did not "make much sense." Vine also commented on how she felt Gi-hun was relegated to "a side-character," and was underwhelmed by his final confrontation with In-ho, stating that the narrative built up their characters for a larger payoff, only for the result to fall short of expectations.

Despite criticism of the character's writing, many reviews praised Lee Jung-Jae's performance. British film magazine Total Film highly praised the actor’s acting, saying "Lee Jung-Jae’s acting this season and in the ‘Squid Game’ series is one of the greatest performances in TV history." American film media Decider commented: "Lee Jung-Jae’s acting over the three seasons could not have been higher. It is really difficult to completely transform a character like this, and he did it very naturally and effortlessly." Others reviews noted how well Jung-Jae worked on Gi-hun's changing attitude and facial expression throughout the course of the season and the show in general; Britain’s largest political newspaper The Guardian noted how his acting transcended language: "Lee Jung-jae’s character Seong Gi-hun’s face was as expressive as rubber, with various and rich expressions. With just his expressions, he expressed all the pain and emotions that the game demands." Empire Magazine qualified his performance as "stunning."
