= Squid Game season 2 =

Season of South Korean television series

Squid Game
- Season 2
- Promotional poster
- Showrunner: Hwang Dong-hyuk
- Starring: Lee Jung-jae; Lee Byung-hun; Yim Si-wan; Lee Seo-hwan; Kang Ha-neul; Wi Ha-joon; Park Gyu-young; Lee Jin-wook; Choi Seung-hyun; Park Sung-hoon; Yang Dong-geun; Park Hee-soon; Kang Ae-shim; Roh Jae-won; Jo Yu-ri
- No. of episodes: 7

Release
- Original network: Netflix
- Original release: December 26, 2024

Season chronology
- ← Previous; Season 1 Next → Season 3

The second season of South Korean dystopian survival thriller television series Squid Game, marketed as Squid Game 2 (Korean: 오징어 게임 2) and created by writer and director Hwang Dong-hyuk, was released on Netflix on December 26, 2024.

Four days after its premiere, the second season had set new streaming records with 68 million views, exceeding the highest premiere viewership for Netflix held by the first season of Wednesday at 50.1 million views during its premiere week. According to Netflix, the season ranked at No. 1 in 92 countries. It garnered positive reviews from critics. A third and final season, which was filmed back-to-back with the second season, was released on June 27, 2025.

== Episodes ==
No. overall	No. in season	Title	Directed by	Written by	Original release date
10	1	"Bread and Lottery"; Transliteration: "Ppanggwa bokgwon" (Korean: 빵과 복권)	Hwang Dong-hyuk	Hwang Dong-hyuk	December 26, 2024
Seong Gi-hun leaves the terminal (Note: As depicted in the first season episode "One Lucky Day".) determined to confront the Front Man and removes a tracking device from behind his ear after realizing he is being watched. Hwang Jun-ho survives his fall from the cliff (Note: As depicted in the first season episode "Front Man".) after being rescued by Park, a shrimp boat captain. Two years later Gi-hun lives frugally in a fortified hotel while employing his former loan shark, Mr. Kim, and his associates to locate the Recruiter in Seoul. Jun-ho, still a police officer, continues searching for the games' island with Park, while Kim and Choi Woo-seok eventually find the Recruiter, who offers vagrants bread or a lottery ticket and destroys the uneaten bread. Kim and Woo-seok are abducted and forced into a deadly rock-paper-scissors game combined with Russian roulette, where Kim sacrifices himself to save Woo-seok. Jun-ho traces Gi-hun's base, and the Recruiter confronts Gi-hun, revealing his past as a soldier in the games and that he killed his own father, a player, before challenging Gi-hun to Russian roulette, which ends with the Recruiter's death.
11	2	"Halloween Party"; Transliteration: "Hallowin pati" (Korean: 할로윈 파티)	Hwang Dong-hyuk	Hwang Dong-hyuk	December 26, 2024
Gi-hun, Jun-ho, and Woo-seok follow a lead from the Recruiter to a Halloween party. Woo-seok recruits a group of mercenaries, Gi-hun plants a tracker inside himself, and the three devise a plan to locate the Front Man. Jun-ho keeps secret that the Front Man is his brother, In-ho. Meanwhile, Gi-hun continues to support Sang-woo's mother and Cheol, working with a broker to reunite Cheol with his mother from North Korea, and places a silent call to his estranged daughter. At the party, Gi-hun is escorted by one of the game's pink-clad soldiers into a limousine while the team follows. He confronts the Front Man via speaker, demanding an end to the games, but then requests to re-enter the games as a player after his team's cars were attacked. Meanwhile, Kang No-eul, a North Korean defector seeking to extract her daughter from the North, is recruited by a masked figure and joins the games as a soldier.
12	3	"001"	Hwang Dong-hyuk	Hwang Dong-hyuk	December 26, 2024
Gi-hun awakens in the games' dormitory with 455 other players, where a manager announces a new rule allowing participants to vote after each game on whether to end the competition and split the accumulated prize money. The first game is Red Light, Green Light, during which Gi-hun recognizes Player 390 as his friend Jung-bae and tries to warn others about the danger, initially being ignored but eventually helping reduce casualties. Despite this, many players are killed, including victims deliberately caused by Player 230, known as Thanos. Gi-hun and Player 120, Cho Hyun-ju, attempt to save a wounded player, but he is killed by No-eul. After the game, Gi-hun urges everyone to vote to stop the games and reveals he previously won a past iteration, but most players choose to continue. The vote is split between those who want to leave and those who want to stay, with In-ho, posing as Player 001, casting the deciding vote to continue the games.
13	4	"Six Legs"; Transliteration: "Yeoseot gaeui dari" (Korean: 여섯 개의 다리)	Hwang Dong-hyuk	Hwang Dong-hyuk	December 26, 2024
In-ho pretends to ally himself with Gi-hun and fabricates a partially true story about why he joined the games. Thanos and Nam-gyu attack Player 333, Myung-gi, but In-ho intervenes and easily stops them, after which Myung-gi is reunited with his pregnant ex-girlfriend Jun-hee. At the same time, a group of guards led by a Masked Officer secretly harvest organs from eliminated players, ordering No-eul to ignore the operation, which she refuses to do. Jun-ho unsuccessfully seeks police support. The second game is announced, requiring players to form teams of five for a six-legged pentathlon of traditional children's games to be completed within five minutes. Gi-hun forms a team with In-ho, Jung-bae, Jun-hee, and Kang Dae-ho, while other teams are formed, including one led by Thanos. When one team fails the challenge, No-eul notices guards leaving a wounded player alive and executes him, continuing her attempt to disrupt the illegal organ trade.
14	5	"One More Game"; Transliteration: "Han pan deo" (Korean: 한 판 더)	Hwang Dong-hyuk	Hwang Dong-hyuk	December 26, 2024
After Hyun-ju's team manages to win through mutual support, many other teams are inspired and survive. Gi-hun's team survives and the five agree to ally and exchange names after the game, with In-ho calling himself "Oh Young-il". No-eul is attacked by two soldiers involved in the organ trade, warning her not to interfere. During the following vote, In-ho encourages the players to vote against continuing the games, but a larger majority opts to proceed, believing the prize pool remains insufficient. Gi-hun confides in Jung-bae about his growing uncertainty in rescuing everyone. Meanwhile, Jun-ho and Woo-seok, now joined by an expanded mercenary team and Captain Park, continue their search for the island. The third game, "Mingle", requires players to form groups based on an announced number and enter designated rooms accordingly. (Note: The song played during the merry-go-round that the players stand on during the game is called dunggeulge dunggeulge (둥글게 둥글게), which literally means "round and round". The song is a classic Korean song for a version of a Korean musical chairs game. The real version of the game involves children going around the table or stadium.)
15	6	"O X"	Hwang Dong-hyuk	Hwang Dong-hyuk	December 26, 2024
During the game "Mingle", players struggle to fit their alliances into rooms, leading to widespread tension, betrayal, and many deaths, including Gyeong-su and Young-mi. In the final round, Jung-bae sees In-ho kill another player to secure a room. Afterward, Gi-hun and In-ho argue over pushing for a vote to end the games but decide against it. During the vote, several players switch to voting to leave, resulting in a tie decided by In-ho and a one-day delay before another vote. Later, Thanos and Nam-gyu try to coerce Min-su into changing his vote, but Myung-gi and others intervene, triggering a fight in which Thanos is killed by Myung-gi. Meanwhile, Jun-ho’s team discovers a supposed entrance to the island that turns out to be a decoy rigged with explosives, killing one of the mercenaries.
16	7	"Friend or Foe"; Transliteration: "Chinguwa jeok" (Korean: 친구와 적)	Hwang Dong-hyuk	Hwang Dong-hyuk	December 26, 2024
Captain Park sabotages Jun-ho's team's drone and kills its pilot. Following the bathroom fight, the players realize they can kill others to increase the prize pool and weaken the opposing voters. Gi-hun predicts an attack that night, and convinces a small group of "X" players to avoid attacking. During the massacre, Gi-hun's group remains hidden while the rest of the group suffers heavy losses, including Se-mi, who is killed by Nam-gyu. The "X"s in Gi-hun's group fake their deaths and attack the soldiers, killing all but one and taking their firearms. They start a rebellion and force the surviving soldier to guide them to the control room. However, more soldiers open fire along the way, and the rebellion begins to falter as the group runs out of ammunition; Dae-ho, tasked with retrieving more magazines, suffers an anxiety attack and is unable to return. In-ho betrays the group by killing two players and faking his death, while other players who surrender are executed. Gi-hun and Jung-bae are captured. In-ho, now masked as the Front Man, executes Jung-bae in front of a distraught Gi-hun.

== Cast and characters ==
Numbers in parentheses denote the character's assigned player number in the Squid Game universe unless otherwise specified.

=== Main cast ===
- Lee Jung-jae as Seong Gi-hun (성기훈; [sʰʌŋ.ɡi.βun], 456)
- Lee Byung-hun as Hwang In-ho / "Oh Young-il" / the Front Man (황인호; [ɸwaŋ.in.ɦo], 001)
- Yim Si-wan as Lee Myung-gi / "MG Coin" (이명기; [i.mjʌŋ.gi], 333)
- Kang Ha-neul as Kang Dae-ho (강대호; [kaŋ.dɛ.βo], 388)
- Wi Ha-joon as Detective Hwang Jun-ho (황준호; [ɸwaŋ.dʑun.ɦo])
- Park Gyu-young as Kang No-eul (강노을; [kaŋ.no.ɯɭ], Guard 011)
- Lee Jin-wook as Park Gyeong-seok (박경석; [pak̚.k͈jʌŋ.sːʌk̚], 246)
- Park Sung-hoon as Cho Hyun-ju (조현주; [tɕo.ʝʌn.dʑu], 120)
- Yang Dong-geun as Park Yong-sik (박용식; [pak̚.joŋ.ɕːik̚], 007)
- Kang Ae-shim as Jang Geum-ja (장금자; [tɕaŋ.gɯm.dʑa], 149)
- Jo Yu-ri as Kim Jun-hee (김준희; [kim.dʑun.ɦɰi], 222)

=== Special guest stars ===
- Jung Ho-yeon as Kang Sae-byeok (067)
- Park Hae-soo as Cho Sang-Woo (218)

=== Recurring ===
- T.O.P as Choi Su-bong / "Thanos" (최수봉 / 타노스, 230)
- Song Young-chang as Im Jeong-dae (임정대, 100)
- Lee Seo-hwan as Park Jung-bae (박정배; [pak̚.t͈ɕʌŋ.bɛ], 390)
- Chae Kook-hee as Seon-nyeo (선녀, 044)
- Lee David as Park Min-su (박민수, 125)
- Roh Jae-won as Nam-gyu (남규, 124)
- Won Ji-an as Se-mi (세미, 380)
- Kim Si-eun as Kim Young-mi (김영미, 095)
- Park Hee-soon as Masked Officer
- Oh Dal-su as Sea Captain Park
- Jeon Seok-ho as Choi Woo-seok
- Sung Do-hyun as Kim, the mercenary leader
- Kang Sung-wook as Gyeong-su (경수, 256)
- Lee Sung-woo as Kim Yeong-sam (김영삼, 226)
- Baek Seung-chul as Kwon Byeong-su (권병수, 047)

=== Guest cast ===
- Gong Yoo as the Recruiter, a salesman who finds participants for the Game.
- Choi Gwi-hwa as Kim Gi-min (김기민, 203)
- Lee Gyu-hoe as Kim Yun-tae (353)
- Park Jin-woo as Lee Seung-won (336)
- Woo Jung-kook as 'Lunchbox' (039)
- Park Hye-jin as Sang-woo's mother
- Park Si-wan as Kang Cheol, Kang Sae-byeok's younger brother
- Kim Pub-lae as Mr. Kim
- Lee Joo-sil as Park Mal-soon, Hwang Jun-ho's mother and Hwang In-ho's stepmother
- Choi Jae-sup as Choi Jae-sup, a broker
- Song Ji-woo as Kang Mi-na (강미나, 196)
- Jo Si-nae as Park Mi-hwa (박미화, 006)
- Seo Soo-chan as Player 004
- Ha Soo-ho as Player 145
- Park Hyun-chul as Jang Do-yeong (장도영, 198)
- Park Bo-kyung as Player 254
- Lee Eun-mi as Lee Eun-ju (이은주, 283)
- Kim Geum-sun as Player 349
- Jo Hyun-woo as Kim Nam-du (김남두, 444)

== Production ==
=== Development ===
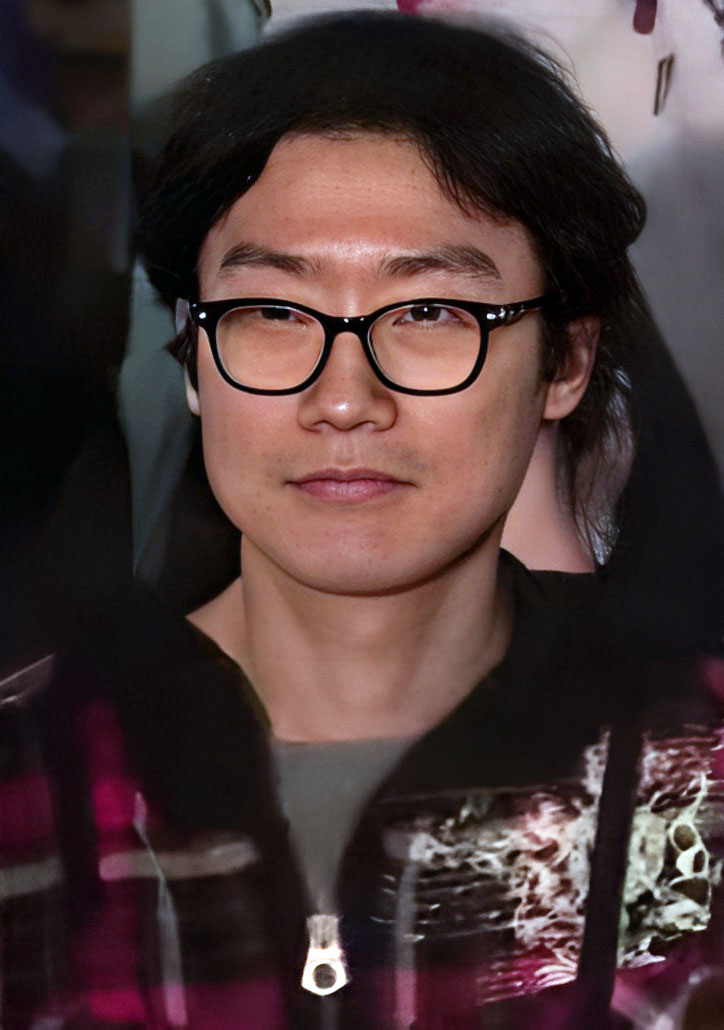
Series creator and director Hwang Dong-hyuk

In late October 2021, Squid Game creator Hwang Dong-hyuk stated he was in discussions with Netflix regarding a second season. He further stated in December 2021 that he was also discussing a third season with Netflix. Hwang wanted to produce another film first, as well as secure a contract with Netflix to release additional films he may create alongside further Squid Game seasons, so as to avoid becoming known only for Squid Game. Hwang confirmed that he had begun conceptualization work on a second season during a press event in November 2021, with plans to bring back Lee Jung-jae to reprise his role of Gi-hun. Netflix stated in response to Hwang's comments that they had not yet officially greenlit a second season, but were in discussions with Hwang towards one. During an earnings call in January 2022, Netflix's Ted Sarandos said when asked about a second season "Absolutely...the Squid Game universe has just begun." Hwang said in April 2022 that he presently was working on Killing Old People Club, an adaptation of a work called "Pape Satan Aleppe: Chronicles of a Liquid Society" by Umberto Eco, and anticipated that the second season of Squid Game would be completed and broadcast by 2024. Netflix confirmed that the second season was greenlit in June 2022.

=== Writing ===
Due to the stress of writing and producing the first series of nine episodes himself, Hwang initially had no immediate plans to write a second season to Squid Game, and did not have well-developed plans for a follow-up story and said that if he were to write one, he would likely need a staff of writers and directors to help him. However, with the immense popularity of the first season, Hwang later opined about the possibility of a second season in 2021, telling CNN, "There's nothing confirmed at the moment, but so many people are enthusiastic that I'm really contemplating it." Hwang also said in an interview with The Times that a second season may focus more on the story of the Front Man as well as incorporating more about the police: "I think the issue with police officers is not just an issue in Korea. I see it on the global news that the police force can be very late in acting on things—there are more victims or a situation gets worse because of them not acting fast enough. This was an issue that I wanted to raise." He added that he also wanted to explore the relationship between the cryptic Front Man and his policeman brother Hwang Jun-ho, as well as the background of the recruiter character (portrayed by Gong Yoo). Hwang said that a particular inspiration behind the decision to continue the Squid Game story was The Matrix film series, in which Neo chooses the red pill over the blue pill; Gi-Hun, similarly, chooses to go after those responsible for the game rather than go back to his life.

Speaking about the games that appear in the season, Hwang said "They are once again simple children's games that a lot of kids in Korea grew up playing. I remember being on set and being reminded of my childhood days." However, he also wanted the games to be more universally recognized this time: "In many different countries around the world, there will be some kind of version similar to these games that you probably have played as a child,...They're going to be both very easy to understand and play, and very fun."

=== Casting ===
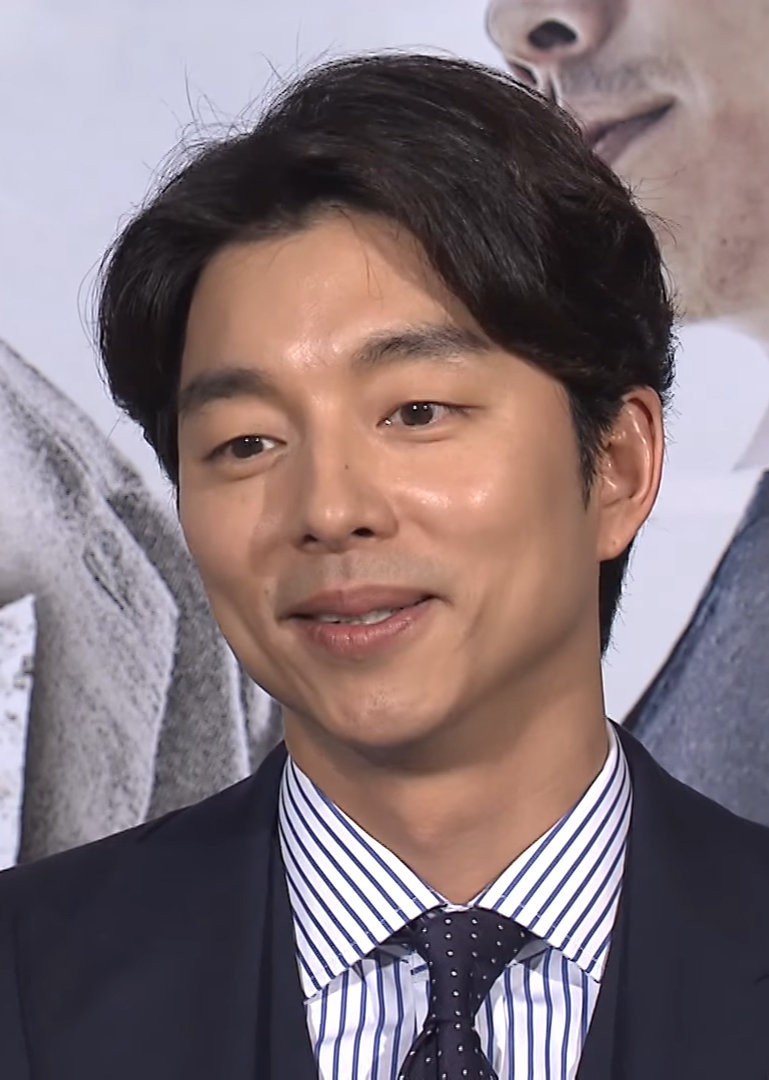
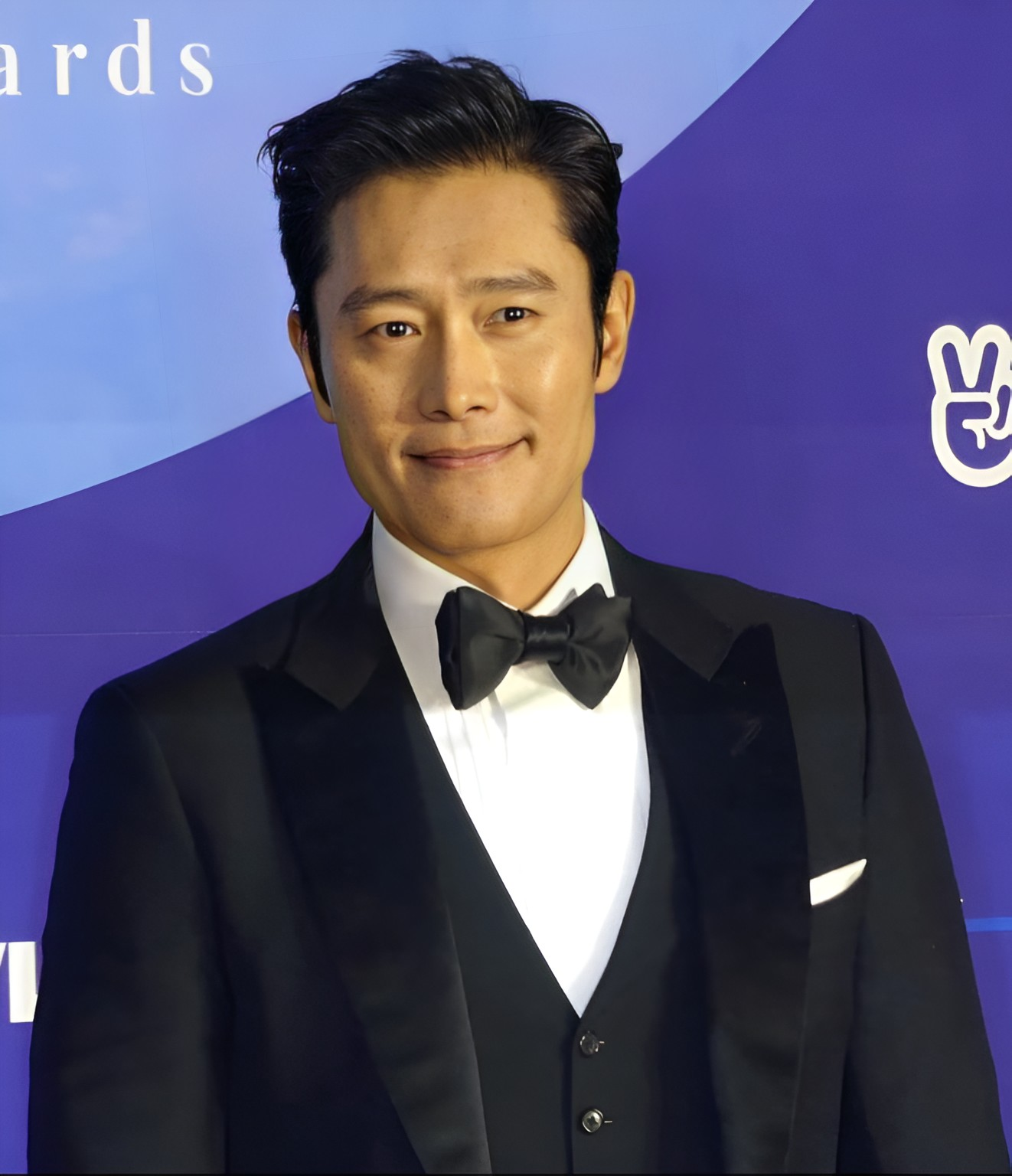
Director Hwang requested that actors Gong Yoo (left) and Lee Byung-hun (right), with whom he had previously worked, appear as the Recruiter and the Front Man, respectively, in Squid Game.

In April 2022, Hwang confirmed that the characters of Gi-hun and the Front Man would return for the second season. During Netflix's Tudum: A Global Fan Event in June 2023, Lee Jung-jae was confirmed to reprise his role alongside Lee Byung-hun, Gong Yoo and Wi Ha-joon. On June 29, Netflix released more info on the new season's cast, which includes Kang Ha-neul, Park Sung-hoon, Yim Si-wan, Yang Dong-geun, Park Gyu-young, Lee Jin-wook, Won Ji-an, Jo Yu-ri, Kang Ae-shim, Choi Seung-hyun, Lee David, and Roh Jae-won.

Prior to the season's release, the casting choice of Park Sung-hoon as transgender ex-soldier Hyun-Ju was controversial due to some wanting a trans person to authentically portray their experiences. Criticism fell on both the casting of a cisgender person for the role instead of a transgender person, as well as for casting a man in particular as opposed to a woman. Some argued in response to this criticism that South Korea is conservative with regards to LGBTQ rights, and that trying to find a transgender actress willing to put herself in the spotlight was not reasonable. People also opined that having a trans character in a South Korean series at all is an important step in representation. On December 18, 2024, during press day for Squid Game 2, director and creator Hwang Dong-hyuk spoke to a group of journalists, about why he wanted to include a trans character this time around:

The people who come to join the games in Squid Game are usually marginalized or neglected from society, and not just financially speaking, but people who would belong to marginalized groups. In season one, the representative character for that was Ali, who was a foreigner working in Korea, which is one of the most representative minority groups in Korea. Currently today, unfortunately, in the Korean society the gender minority is a group that is not as accepted widely within society. I wanted to create a character that would represent that. Acceptance of trans people has gotten better recently, but it's still not where it needs to be. In Korea, when you are a gender minority, it is not as widely accepted yet, unfortunately, and you are still seen to be very much out of the norm. And so by creating a character like Hyun-ju, through her choices, her actions, and the way she carries herself in the game, I hope that that could raise awareness of these issues that we face today.

Though Hwang wanted to cast a transgender actor for the role, it was difficult to find such an actor in Korea due to the above issues, and believed that Park's prior roles in The Glory and Queen of Tears made him capable of portraying the role.

Jo Yu-ri, who portrayed Kim Jun-hee (김준희, 222), is best known as a former member of the South Korean–Japanese girl group Iz*One. She first gained prominence after participating in Mnet's reality competition series Produce 48 in 2018, where she finished in third place and debuted with Iz*One on October 29, 2018. Following Iz*One's disbandment in April 2021, Jo embarked on a successful solo career, releasing her debut single album Glassy in October 2021, which garnered her several nominations for Rookie of the Year at major music awards.

On December 4, 2024, T.O.P was revealed as a cast member through the official Netflix YouTube account in the form of a "Meet the Cast" video. He would play the role of a former rapper, Thanos, fallen from grace due to a crypto scam. The character was created before casting, T.O.P receiving the role after Hwang found his "serious" approach. Hwang explained that he wanted to cast someone who stopped working due to drugs, T.O.P retiring from the K-pop industry and leaving BigBang over a marijuana conviction. The casting of T.O.P received controversy in South Korea, with the actor's face being blurred on the Korean show Live This Morning when airing a segment about the show. The casting led some viewers to believe that Lee Jung-jae, who portrayed Seong Gi-hun and was close to T.O.P, had gotten him the role, a claim that Lee denied. Netflix and Hwang received criticism for this casting for possibly setting a bad precedent. T.O.P was absent for a time from promotional events with the cast. Responding to speculation that he was removed from promotional events over the controversy, Hwang said that they planned to not have him featured from the beginning, wanting T.O.P to be able to talk about his involvement at his own pace. He felt that he had "a lot of guts" for agreeing to do the performance considering his history with drugs, and was surprised that he had still not been forgiven. He also believed that the reaction to his casting would not be reflected outside of Korea due to different legality and opinions on marijuana use in some countries. He also believed that his character may prove popular with younger viewers in Korea.

=== Filming ===
Principal photography for the second season was scheduled to start in July 2023 and was expected to last for "at least 10 months". On July 10, staff members of the production faced a controversy involving allegations of mistreatment towards citizens during filming at Incheon Airport, Seoul. The production company issued an official apology on the matter. Filming was reportedly underway in August 2023. It took place at a film studio in Daejeon. Filming wrapped in June 2024 and was filmed back-to-back along with the upcoming third season.

=== Music ===
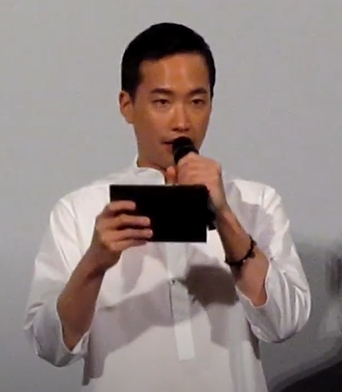
Jung Jae-il composed the score for the season.

Composer Jung Jae-il returned to score the second season, with the soundtrack album being released on December 27, 2024, through Netflix Music. Jung confirmed his involvement in 2023, telling the BBC the second season would retain some elements from the score to the first season but have a "more bizarre and unique sound". The first episode features the aria "Nessun dorma" from Giacomo Puccini's Turandot, performed by British tenor Paul Potts (who himself won the first season of reality competition show Britain's Got Talent), and "Time to Say Goodbye" by Sarah Brightman and Andrea Bocelli. The third episode features a cover of "Fly Me to the Moon" performed by Joo Won, a song which was also featured in the first season.

== Marketing ==
During Netflix Geeked Week in September 2024, a poster and a teaser for the season were released. Between October and December, Netflix promoted the series in fan conventions around the world, in which invited fans took part in simulated games from the series. The events took place in Lucca, Italy; Paris, France; Amsterdam, the Netherlands; Seoul, South Korea; Los Angeles, United States; Sydney, Australia; São Paulo, Brazil; Warsaw, Poland; London, United Kingdom; and Jakarta, Indonesia.

Spanish streamer Ibai Llanos organized his own version of Squid Game with KFC in Madrid, Spain. Filipino journalist MJ Marfori attended the three-day event for the season and also interviewed Lee Jung-jae. McDonald's Australia ran a limited time "Squid Game Meal" promotion, which came bundled with a Dalgona cookie for customers to extract a shape from, mirroring the first season. One form of the cookie included the shape of the companies signature Golden Arches where, if extracted successfully, customers could scan to enter a competition to win $100,000, alongside replicas of contestants' tracksuits from the series.

== Release ==
The season was released on December 26, 2024, on Netflix. Within the first three days of release, the second season had 68 million views, exceeding the highest premiere viewership for Netflix held by the first season of Wednesday at 50.1 million views during its premiere week. According to Netflix, the season ranked at No. 1 in 92 countries.

== Reception ==
=== Critical response ===
The publications noted that this season received more mixed responses from critics and viewers, with the BBC reporting that critical reaction ranged from "sensational" to "a letdown". On the review aggregator website Rotten Tomatoes, 84% of 98 critics' reviews are positive, with an average rating of 7.2/10. The website's consensus reads: "While Squid Game's return can't help but lose the element of surprise, some absolutely diabolical challenges and a knotty moral outlook keep this sophomore season thrilling." Metacritic, which uses a weighted average, assigned the season a score of 62 out of 100, based on 36 critics, indicating "generally favorable" reviews.

Laura Martin from the BBC gave the season 4 stars out of 5 and said it rivalled the production quality of the first season. Annabel Nugent from The Independent also gave the season 4 stars out of 5 and said while it was not as shocking as the first season, it was still captivating in its violence. Rebecca Nicholson from The Guardian gave the season a less positive review due to issues she found with its plot development and pacing and rated it 3 stars out of 5. Kelly Lawler from USA Today gave the season 2 stars out of 4, calling the plot outlandish and the end unsatisfying.

IGN writer Alex Zalben drew comparisons between Gi-hun and the people behind Squid Game, arguing that the way he commands the people he hires to find the Recruiter mirrors the controlling nature of the games. He also believed that Gi-hun's "seeming heroism" is self-centered, that it is done for redemption more than for the good of others. Gi-hun's development in season 2 was well-received by Gizmodo writers Germain Lussier and Cheryl Eddy, praising actor Lee Jung-jae for managing to capture his shift into a character with "darker intensity" who is struggling with survivor's guilt. The Hollywood Reporter writer Daniel Fienberg felt that, compared to his performance in season 1, where Lee acted with "live-wire dexterity" and being big in both his portrayal of Gi-hun's comedy and trauma, his "one-note haunted aspect" in season 2, while well performed, is less interesting than season 1.

=== Audience response ===
Of all the cast members of the second season, Park Sung-hoon's portrayal of transgender ex-soldier Hyun-ju won significant praise from viewers. Many viewers regarded Park's character as one of the most compelling characters in the second season, due to the character development and background of Hyun-ju and Park's dedication and depth in portraying Hyun-ju.

Gong Yoo's brief reprise of the recruiter character also received positive feedback from fans on social media.

T.O.P's casting was not well-received by viewers in South Korea, but was argued in Korea Times to have been more well-received overseas. Some viewers outside South Korea expressed that the negative reaction to T.O.P.'s casting was unreasonable. A survey held by Netflix asking about the new characters found that Thanos was the favorite of 50 percent of the 700,000 respondents, while Hyun-ju received 23%, and Jun-hee got 19%.

The season was boycotted in Vietnam due to a scene in the fifth episode, in which Jung-bae said that Dae-ho's father was "a good person" when he fought in the Vietnam War. This was interpreted by Vietnamese audiences as praising South Korean war crimes in Vietnam, and they demanded authorities "take necessary actions regarding this statement". In an interview on January 6, actor Lee Seo-hwan explained the scene: “That line was supposed to be a compliment about sending his only son to the Marines, not about him serving in the Vietnam War. There was a misunderstanding in that scene. But from a Vietnamese perspective, I understand that it can be hurtful. I feel the weight of responsibility that actors have to bear in every line they say.”

=== Accolades ===
Award ceremony	Year	Category	Nominee	Result	Ref.
Baeksang Arts Awards	2025	Best Supporting Actor	Roh Jae-won	Nominated	
Blue Dragon Series Awards	2025	Best Actor	Lee Byung-hun	Nominated	
Golden Globe Awards	2025	Best Television Series – Drama	Squid Game 2	Nominated	

=== Listicles ===
Name of publisher, year listed, name of listicle, and placement
Publisher	Year	Listicle	Placement	Ref.
South China Morning Post	2024	The 15 best K-dramas of 2024	1st place	
