= Tom Choi =

South Korean-American actor

- Born: Tom T. Choi; Daegu, South Korea
- Education: University of Washington
- Occupations: Actor; writer; producer; filmmaker
- Years active: 1998–present
- Spouse: Jill Renninger
- Children: 1
- Website: tomtchoi.com/index.html

Tom T. Choi (born in Daegu, South Korea) is a South Korean-American actor best known for Teen Wolf and his voice work on the Mortal Kombat video games and the Netflix series Squid Game as the masked voice of Hwang In-ho / The Front Man. He has acted in numerous movies and television programs. Choi is also a producer, director, and writer. He wrote the screenplay and starred in the award-winning short film Lone Hunter.

== Early life ==
Choi was born in Daegu, South Korea and moved to Des Moines, Iowa when he was four years old. After graduating high school, Choi moved to Seattle, Washington, where he graduated from the University of Washington with a bachelor's degree in drama. He then moved to Los Angeles and continued acting in film, television, and commercials. He attended the LACC School of Cinema and Television and now produces, directs, and writes in addition to acting.

== Career ==
Choi began working in film and television in 1998. He has made appearances in multiple blockbuster films and network television shows, and is best known for his roles as Ken Yukimura in Teen Wolf, Liu Kang in the Mortal Kombat series, and the masked voice of Hwang In-ho / The Front Man in Squid Game.

He runs the independent production company Tension Films and was elected in 2015 and 2017 as a board member for the Los Angeles local of SAG-AFTRA, the union's largest local.

=== As a filmmaker and writer ===
He made a short film called Singularity in 2016.

Choi has claimed there are not many film and television roles for Asian Americans. Tom Choi wrote the screenplay for Lone Hunter, and then starred in the short film.

Choi also has a web site called Tension Films to feature his work as a filmmaker and writer.

=== Personal life ===
He married Jill Renninger and has a son.

== Filmography ==
=== Film ===
Year	Title	Role	Notes
2000	Nowheresville	Young (The Waiter)	
2002	Minority Report	Payment – Agent No. 2	
2004	The Plight of Clownana	Actor	Short Film
2006	The Adventures of Big Handsome Guy and His Little Friend	Guy in Crowd	TV movie
2007	The Gene Generation	Dad	
2008	Starlight Mints	Brett	Short Film
2008	Trauma	Doctor, director, writer, producer	Short Film
2009	Operating Instructions	Reporter	TV movie
2009	Un-Broke: What You Need To Know About Money	Real Estate Agent	TV movie
2009	Road to the Altar	Ping	
2011	Untitled Kari Lizer Project	Martin	TV movie
2011	iPhone 4 vs. HTC Evo: Live Action Remake	Sales Guy	Short Film
2011	Hall Pass	Asian Husband	
2011	Speaking Meteorically	Tom	Short Film
2012	Applebaum	Pastor Park	TV movie
2012	Surprise	Bartender	Short Film
2012	God's Country	Yakomoto Brother No. 1	
2012	Letting Go	Executive	
2013	Reincarnation of Frank	Buddha	Short Film
2014	In Your Eyes	Male Nurse	
2015	Lone Hunter	Lee, producer, writer	Short Film Nominated: Best Actor at the Maverick Movie Awards (Tom Choi) Nominated: Best Actor at the Milledgeville Film Festival (Tom Choi) Won: Jury Prize for Best Short Film at the Milledgeville Film Festival
2016	April's Way	Sung-Min	Short Film
2016	Singularity	Singularity Device, director, editor, producer, writer	Awarded Honorable Mention at Justin Lin's Interpretations Short Films Initiative in the NBCUniversal Short Film Festival
2017	Friend Request	Dean	Short film
2017	Snatched	Colonel	
2017	Geostorm	Chinese Representative Lee	
2018	Truth or Dare	Officer Han Chang	
2018	Beautiful Boy	Lecturer	

=== Television ===
Year	Title	Role	Notes
1998	Pacific Blue	Charlie	Episode: "Cruz Control"
2004	The Shield	Sheriff	Episode: "Streaks and Tips"
2005	Grey's Anatomy	Fluoroscope Tech	Episode: "No Man's Land"
2005	Wanted	Paul Shin	Episode: "Rubbing One Out"
2005	Las Vegas	Mr. Nakamura	Episode: "The Real McCoy"
2006	Heist	ER Doctor	Episode: "Strife"
2006	Vanished	A/V Tech	Episode: "Pilot"
2006	The Chelsea Handler Show	Squiggle	Episode: #1.10
2006	Bones	FBI Agent	Episode: "The Boy In the Shroud"
2006	Criminal Minds	Special Agent Nick Casey	Episode: "Empty Planet"
2007	CSI: Miami	SGT Keller	Episode: "No Man's Land"
2007	General Hospital	Jim Harlow	Episode: #1.11265
2007	Brothers & Sisters	Steward	Episode: "An American Family"
2007–08	Women's Murder Club	Police Officer / Uniformed Officer	3 episodes
2008	Miss Guided	Ed the Wheelchair Man	Episode: "Homecoming"
2008	Prison Break	Feng's Driver	2 episodes
2009	Private Practice	Jake	Episode: "Acceptance"
2009	Ghost Whisperer	Volunteer	Episode: "Greek Tragedy"
2009	Lie To Me	Groom	Episode: "Love Always"
2009	ER	Chris Zafares	Episode: "Old Times"
2009	24	Agent Park	Episode: "Day 7: 2:00 a.m.-3:00 a.m."
2010	Leverage	Russell Pan	Episode: "The Runway Job"
2010	The Forgotten	Rufus	Episode: "Train Jane"
2010	Sons of Tuscan	Father	Episode: "Father's Day"
2010	Make It or Break It	Jim (a Rock Father)	Episode: "All or Nothing"
2010	The Suite Life on Deck	Mr. Hashimoto	Episode: "Trouble in Tokyo"
2010	Undercovers	Xu Chen	Episode: "Xerxes"
2011	Chuck	Skinny Guard	Episode: "Chuck Versus the First Bank of Evil"
2011	Franklin & Bash	Coroner	Episode: "She Came Upstairs to Kill Me"
2011	Death Valley	Male Nurse	Episode: "Blood Vessels"
2011	The Closer	Tommy Wong	Episode: "Silent Partner"
2012	Kickin' It	Judge	Episode: "New Jack City"
2012–13	Travel Tech	Producer, writer, actor, Host	2 episodes
2012–13	Static	Series Regular, writer	3 episodes
2013	CSI: Crime Scene Investigation	Director	Episode: "Dead Air"
2013	Southland	Captain Bill Choi	Episode: "Hats and Bats"
2013	Switched at Birth	Reporter	Episode: "Introducing the Miracle"
2013	House of Lies	Realtor	2 episodes
2013	A.N.T. Farm	Mr. Hashimoto	3 episodes
2013–16	NCIS: Los Angeles	LAPD Officer Fong	2 episodes
2014	Days of Our Lives	Dr. Chung	2 episodes
2014	The McCarthys	Doctor Lee	Episode: "Arthur and Marjorie's Night Apart"
2014–16	Teen Wolf	Ken Yukimura	21 episodes
2015	NCIS: Naval Criminal Investigative Service	Navy Commander Bradley Hall	Episode: "Day in Court"
2016	Agent Carter	Dr. Chung	2 episodes
2016	JoJoHead	Actor	Episode: "Bad First Dates"
2017	Nicky, Ricky, Dicky & Dawn	Sophisticated Guy	Episode: "Quad with a Blog"
2017	Hawaii Five-0	Brian Hadley	Episode: "Ua ho'i ka 'opa i Awalua"
2017	Bizaardvark	Dr. Wong	3 episodes
2018	Modern Family	Bob	Episode: "On the Same Paige"
2021–present	Squid Game	Hwang In-ho / The Front Man (masked voice)	13 episodes

=== Video games ===
Year	Title	Role	Notes
2008	Mortal Kombat vs. DC Universe	Liu Kang (voice)	
2011	Mortal Kombat	Liu Kang (voice)	
2015	Mortal Kombat X	Liu Kang (voice)	
2015	Batman: Arkham Knight	(voice)	
2019	Death Stranding	The Collector (voice)	
2020	Fallout 76: Steel Dawn	Knight Daniel Shin (voice)	
2025	Call of Duty: Black Ops 6	Hwang In-ho / The Front Man (voice)	Collaboration with Squid Game

== Awards ==
In 2015, Choi was nominated for Best Actor at the Maverick Movie Awards for the short film Lone Hunter. In 2017, he was nominated for Best Actor and won the Jury Prize for Best Short Film at the Milledgeville Film Festival for Lone Hunter, shared with John Heinsen and Pascal Leister.

In 2016, he received an Honorable Mention at Justin Lin's Interpretations Short Films Initiative in the NBCUniversal Short Film Festival for Singularity. Choi both directed the film and played the leading role.
