= The Recruiter (Squid Game) =

Squid Game character

- Squid Game character
- Gong Yoo as the Recruiter on the second season
- First appearance: "Red Light, Green Light" (2021)
- Last appearance: "Bread and Lottery" (2024)
- Created by: Hwang Dong-hyuk
- Portrayed by: Gong Yoo

In-universe information
- Full name: Unknown
- Aliases: The Recruiter; The Salesman
- Occupation: Game Soldier (formerly); Recruiter for the Game
- Family: Unnamed father (deceased)
- Allies: Hwang In-ho; Oh Il-nam; Park Yeong-gil; Pink Guards; Masked Officer; Captain Ko; Thanos
- Enemies: Seong Gi-hun; Choi Woo-seok; Kim Jeong-rae; Lee Myung-gi; Kim Jun-hee; Player 189; Hwang Jun-ho

The Recruiter, also known as The Salesman, is a major antagonist of the South Korean Netflix drama Squid Game. The Recruiter is an enigmatic figure who is dedicated to recruiting players for the Game through the same process: playing ddakji, giving them money and a card. Among the players he recruited was Seong Gi-hun, thus making him the catalyst behind Gi-hun's journey.

Despite his short appearance in the series, the Recruiter received critical acclaim from critics, with particular praise towards Gong Yoo's performance as the character.

== Appearances ==
=== Background ===
The Recruiter was previously a guard at the Games, serving first as a worker and then as a soldier. At one point, he killed his own father who had lost a game. He was later promoted to his current position.

=== Squid Game season 1 ===
The Recruiter dedicated himself to recruiting people for the Game. With few spots left in the Game, he approached Seong Gi-hun on the subway and offered him the chance to win money playing ddakji. When Gi-hun lost and could not pay him, the Recruiter slapped him, and this continued until Gi-hun won and the Recruiter paid him. Gi-hun refused the game card, and the Recruiter began to tell him everything documented in his life and gave him the card to think about the opportunity. Gi-hun phoned him to participate. A year later, Gi-hun finds the Recruiter playing with someone else and the Recruiter sees Gi-hun, realizing he won, gives him a smile and leaves on the subway.

=== Squid Game season 2 ===
For three years, Gi-hun, with the help of his former loan shark and his team, dedicated himself to searching for the Recruiter in the subway. One day, Kim Jeong-rae, the loan shark, and his partner Choi Woo-seok spot the Recruiter playing ddakji with Lee Myung-gi, and when they left, they set out to follow him. It is revealed that he had given the card to Kim Jun-hee, who calls Myung-gi shortly after Myung-gi wins. The Recruiter buys 100 lottery tickets and loaves of bread, and in a park, he offers one of the two to homeless people. When the majority choose the lottery ticket over the loaf of bread, the Recruiter destroys all the loaves of bread in front of the homeless. Kim and Woo-seok follow the Recruiter, where he knocks them unconscious and takes them to an apartment where he forces them to play rock, paper, scissors with Russian roulette, during which Kim sacrifices himself and dies.

The Recruiter later locates and confronts Gi-Hun at his base of operations and explains that he was a guard and later a soldier in the Games and killed his own father, a player. The Recruiter justifies the games by calling the people who play them scum. He then challenges Gi-hun to play Russian roulette, with the condition that they don't spin the six-shooter's cylinder after each shot. The bullet ends up in the sixth chamber, which is revealed by Gi-hun surviving three turns going first. After a final taunt by Gi-Hun, who remarks that the Recruiter is nothing more than the game runners' "dog", he accepts his loss and instead of attempting to flee or killing Gi-Hun, shoots himself in the head. Gi-hun finds a card in the Recruiter's pocket that he later uses to make contact with Hwang In-ho, the Front Man of the games.

Long after his death, the Recruiter was mentioned by Jun-hee to Park Jung-bae about her expertise in Ddakji and later Thanos bullies Park Min-su and explains how the Recruiter prevented Thanos from falling off the bridge by giving him the card, which Min-su hesitated to have accepted that he got the card too.

=== Squid Game season 3 ===
The Recruiter appears in a flashback in season 3. He is also seen on a photograph with Captain Park, which Choi Woo-seok discovers while searching for evidence to incriminate Park for secretly working with Hwang In-ho and the game runners.

== Concept and creation ==
The Recruiter was created by Hwang Dong-hyuk and portrayed by Gong Yoo. Yoo worked with Hwang in a previous film, Silenced, and Hwang had asked him to appear in a small role in Squid Game. Speaking with Business Insider, Hwang gave the Recruiter a bigger role after his warm reception in the first season, wanting to show the true nature of his character: a "sadist" who does everything for the Games "for the love of the game," giving him his own narrative. Since Gong Yoo has only played good characters, Hwang was interested in seeing how he portrayed a crazy bad guy. When creating the character, Hwang ended up designing him as someone who lived a hard life, similar to that of the people who participate in the Game, and who was filled with hatred, hatred that he expressed in those kinds of people and thus believed himself to be better than them. A trailer showed the luxurious life of the Recruiter, being luxurious unlike the people he recruits. He has also become one of the faces of the phrase "Wanna play a game?", popularized by the Saw franchise.

The dynamic established between the Recruiter and Seong Gi-hun in the first episode of the second season serves to show the different sides of humanity in this survival system.

== Reception ==
Gong Yoo's brief reprise of the character in the second series received positive feedback from fans on social media. Roxana Hadadi, from Vulture, highlighted "the brilliance" of Gong's performance and "how feral, grotesque, and undeserving of happiness they really are [Recruiter's emotions] [...] qualities Gong Yoo brandishes with a precision as razor-sharp as that jawline."
