= Cho Sang-woo (Squid Game) =

Squid Game character

- Squid Game character
- Park Hae-soo as Cho Sang-woo / Player 218
- First appearance: "Red Light, Green Light" (2021)
- Last appearance: "Bread and Lottery" (2024)
- Created by: Hwang Dong-hyuk
- Portrayed by: Park Hae-soo (adult); Park Si-won (child)
- Voiced by: Stephen Fu (English)

In-universe information
- Alias: Player 218
- Occupation: Investment broker
- Family: Unnamed mother

Korean name
- Hangul: 조상우
- RR: Jo Sangu
- MR: Cho Sangu

Cho Sang-woo (Korean: 조상우), also known as Player 218, is a fictional character in the first season of the South Korean survival drama television series Squid Game. He is portrayed by South Korean actor Park Hae-soo, while the younger version is portrayed by Park Si-won. The character was based on one of series creator Hwang Dong-hyuk's childhood friends. Sang-woo was one of the three finalists in the competition, alongside his childhood friend Seong Gi-hun, who had become his rival by that point, and Kang Sae-Byeok, whom he killed before the final game. He is voiced in the English dub by Stephen Fu.

Sang-woo was the leader of an investment team at a securities company, and a graduate of Seoul National University. He became a successful investment banker but fell into heavy debt after failed investments, leading to a warrant for his arrest on charges of financial crimes. To solve his financial problems, Sang-woo participated in the game. Initially allied with Gi-hun and several other players, he takes on a darker role as the series progresses, becoming willing to kill other players to ensure his own survival. His character would then be contrasted with Lee Myung-gi, who also kills players for his own survival.

Ever since his appearance, Sang-Woo had received a positive reception from critics, who described him as a "realistic character", with particular praise towards his tragic descent to villainy, his bond with Gi-hun and Ali, and Park's performance.

== Appearances ==
Cho Sang-woo was childhood friends with Seong Gi-hun. The two friends would often play children's games, such as Squid. Sang-woo later attended Seoul National University, and graduated at the top of his class. According to Gi-hun, Sang-woo's graduation from SNU caused him to become a famous prodigy in the Ssangmun-dong neighbourhood in the city of Seoul, the capital of South Korea. After graduating from SNU, Sang-woo became the leader of an investment team at the securities company Joy Investments. He illegally siphoned money from his clients’ balances, then invested it in derivatives and futures options, which failed, resulting in the loss of ₩6 billion won. He also used his mother's house and store as collateral for his illegal activities. He was then recruited to play in a series of deadly children’s games, and was reunited with Gi-hun. After learning that participants who lose are killed, Sang-woo gave Gi-hun advice on how to survive "Red Light, Green Light,” by informing him that the doll is a motion sensor. After both Sang-woo and Gi-hun survive the game, the majority of players want to quit, horrified at the revelation of players who lose being killed. When the masked staff members repeat the first two consent forms, Sang-woo took the initiative to conduct a vote among the contestants to end the Squid Game. However, he ultimately decided to continue participating when he learned that the prize money for winning was ₩45.6 billion won. After the games were stopped by the majority vote, his heavy debt almost led him to kill himself in his motel room before being offered the chance to rejoin the Squid Game, which he accepts.

During the Squid Game, Sang-woo helped Gi-hun and others in their alliance, particularly befriending Ali Abdul. However, to ensure his own survival, he became increasingly ruthless and inconsiderate as the games progressed. Sang-woo resorted to manipulation to win the Marbles game, betraying Ali and leaving him to die. He later murdered Player 017 in the Glass Stepping Stones game, and afterward, Kang Sae-byeok, to keep himself in the game. Sang-woo was one of the two players to make it into the final round of the competition, along with Gi-hun, who by then was his rival. The two faced off in the eponymous Squid game, in which, after an intense battle between the two, Gi-hun defeated him. Before claiming his victory, Gi-hun attempted to end the games prematurely by invoking clause 3 of the consent form, hoping to end the game and save his friend's life. However, Sang-woo decided to stab himself in the neck, allowing Gi-hun to be the winner of the game. As a final request before his death, Sang-woo asked Gi-hun to use some of the prize winnings to help his mother. Sang-woo's request to Gi-hun is fulfilled after he gives a portion to Sang-woo's mother, and also puts Kang Cheol (Sae-byeok's younger brother) in her care, offering a better life for both of them. Sang-woo doesn't make a physical appearance in Season 2 or 3, except in a nightmare Gi-hun had in the first episode of season 2.

== Concept and creation ==
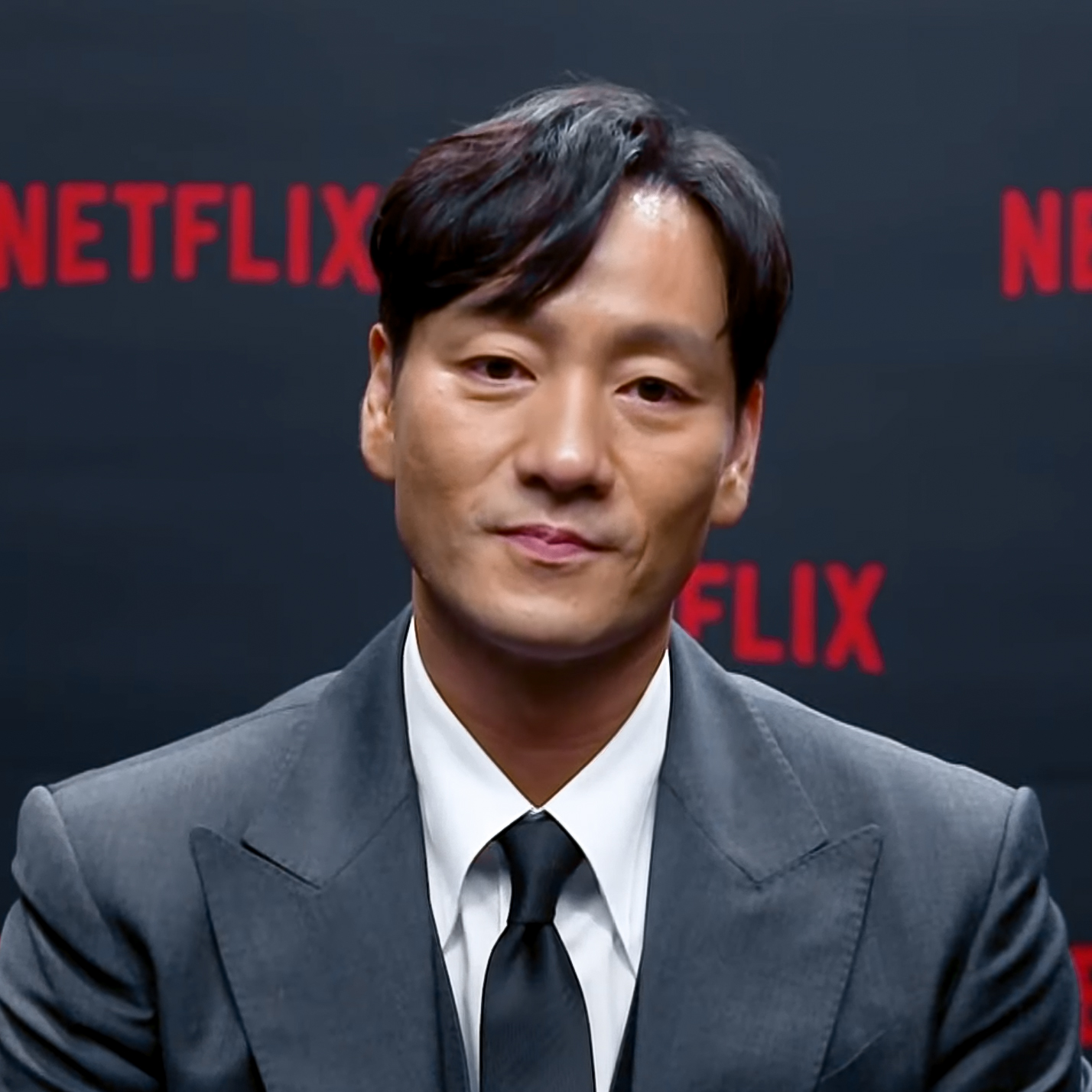
Cho Sang-woo, a character inspired by creator Hwang Dong-hyuk's childhood friends, was portrayed by Park Hae-soo.

Cho Sang-woo was created by series creator Hwang Dong-hyuk, who based him on one of his childhood friends. Hwang also based Sang-woo, as well as Gi-hun, on his own experiences and different aspects of himself; where Gi-hun was based on being raised by an economically disadvantaged single mother in the Ssangmun district of Seoul, Sang-woo reflected Hwang having attended Seoul National University with high expectations from his family and neighborhood. Sang-woo was meant to symbolize the intense societal pressure experienced by series creator Hwang, who witnessed harsh realities of inequality in South Korean society and saw those around him fall into debt, drawing from these experiences when shaping the character.

Park Hae-soo portrays Sang-woo, an investment banker who enters the games in an attempt to repay money he embezzled from his clients. He stated that he had anticipated some level of international interest in Squid Game, noting that while the games are Korean, they contain universally relatable themes. Park stated that he was drawn by the psychological transformations experienced by the characters. He also stated that he felt no difference between himself and his character while filming the series. Park praised Hwang's characterization of Cho Sang-woo, noting that Hwang fully immersed himself in the role's perspective. He expressed appreciation for the director's dedication, stating that he continued refining Sang-woo's lines until right before filming.

== Reception ==
Cho Sang-woo has been described as one of the most "realistic" characters in the series. Writing for Collider, Hwang Dong-hyuk explained that Sang-woo's actions stem from a belief in his own superiority, stating, "I still have to be morally right because I'm superior to them." Hwang noted that Sang-woo views victory as a result of personal effort, ignoring the role of chance and others' sacrifices, thus clinging to a self-justifying illusion of merit. Alexandra Moroca and Ajay Aravind from Comic Book Resources, criticized Sang-woo's actions, though they acknowledged that his behavior is understandable when viewed through the lens of a desperate man with nothing to lose. Although he initially shows compassion and forms bonds with Gi-hun and Ali, the lure of the prize money ultimately leads him down a darker path, transforming him into a more antagonistic figure over the course of the series.

Tatler writer Gia Hân believed that Sang-woo's character was not a traditional villain, and instead believed him to be complex and morally conflicted. He discussed how Sang-woo became "calculating, ruthless, and emotionally detached", leading him to kill people in order to win. Hân found his transition from the "warm elder brother in Gi-hun's childhood memories" to the "cold strategist" as subtle, haunting, and tragic. He believed that the performance made the audience feel conflicted over his actions, stating that despite being incensed and disapproving of his actions, they were nevertheless intrigued and "strangely empathetic."
