= Hee-soo =

- Hangul: 희수
- RR: Huisu
- MR: Hŭisu

Hee-soo, also spelled Hui-su, is a Korean given name.

== People ==
- Park Hee-soo (born 1983), South Korean baseball pitcher
- Randi Heesoo Griffin (born 1988), American ice hockey player
- Colde (born Kim Hee-soo, 1994), South Korean singer-songwriter
- Byun Hui-su (1998–2021), South Korean transgender soldier

== See also ==
- List of Korean given names
