= Nam-kyu =

- Hangul: 남규
- RR: Namgyu
- MR: Namgyu
- IPA: [namɡju]

Nam-kyu, also spelled Nam-gyu, is a Korean given name.

== Nam-kyu ==
- Cho Nam-kyu (born 1985), South Korean short track speed skater
- Kang Nam-kyu (born 1968), South Korean baseball player
- Park Nam-kyu (born 1936), South Korean sport shooter
- Yoo Nam-kyu (born 1968), South Korean table tennis player
- Lim Nam-kyu (born 1989), South Korean luger

== Nam-gyu ==
- Jeong Nam-gyu (1969–2009), South Korean serial killer
- Lee Nam-gyu, South Korean screenwriter
- Paek Nam-gyu (1891–1956), South Korean Esperantist
- Nam-Gyu Park (born 1960), South Korean chemist

== Fictional characters ==
- Nam-gyu (Squid Game), Squid Game character

== See also ==
- List of Korean given names
