= Park Jung-bae =

South Korean baseball player

- Pitcher
- Born: April 1, 1982 (age 44); Gongju, South Chungcheong
- Bats: Right Throws: Right

KBO debut
- 2005, for the Doosan Bears

KBO statistics (through July 26, 2019)
- Win–loss record: 28–23
- Earned run average: 4.83
- Strikeouts: 328
- Stats at Baseball Reference

Teams
- Doosan Bears (2005–2011); SK Wyverns (2012–2019)

- Park Jung-bae
- Hangul: 박정배
- Hanja: 朴廷培
- RR: Bak Jeongbae
- MR: Pak Chŏngbae

Park Jung-bae (Korean: 박정배; Hanja: 朴廷培, born April 1, 1982) is a retired South Korean professional baseball pitcher for the SK Wyverns of the KBO League.
