= Squid Game season 1 =

Season of South Korean television series

Squid Game
- Season 1
- Promotional poster
- Showrunner: Hwang Dong-hyuk
- Starring: Lee Jung-jae; Lee Byung-hun; Park Hae-soo; O Yeong-su; Wi Ha-joon; Jung Ho-yeon; Heo Sung-tae; Anupam Tripathi; Lee Yoo-mi; Kim Joo-ryoung
- No. of episodes: 9

Release
- Original network: Netflix
- Original release: September 17, 2021

Season chronology
- Next → Season 2

The first season of the South Korean dystopian survival thriller television series Squid Game was created, written, and directed by Hwang Dong-hyuk for Netflix, where it was released worldwide on September 17, 2021.

The season stars Lee Jung-jae, Park Hae-soo, O Yeong-su, Wi Ha-joon, Jung Ho-yeon, Heo Sung-tae, Anupam Tripathi and Kim Joo-ryoung. It revolves around a secret contest where 456 players, all of whom are in deep financial hardship, risk their lives to play a series of deadly children's games for the chance to win a ₩45.6 billion cash prize, ₩100 million taken from each eliminated contestant.

The season was released worldwide on September 17, 2021, to critical acclaim and international attention. It became Netflix's most-watched series and the most-watched program in 94 countries, attracting more than 142 million member households and 1.65 billion viewing hours in its first four weeks, surpassing Bridgerton as the service's most-watched show. It received numerous accolades, including a Golden Globe Award for O, and Screen Actors Guild Awards for Lee and Jung, respectively; all three were also the first Korean actors to win in those categories. The first season received 14 Primetime Emmy Award nominations, including for Outstanding Drama Series, making it the first non-English-language work to be nominated in this category; Lee won for Outstanding Lead Actor, the first for an Asian actor in a non-English part.

== Episodes ==
No. overall	No. in season	Title	Directed by	Written by	Original release date
1	1	"Red Light, Green Light"; Transliteration: "Mugunghwa kkochi pideon nal" (Korean: 무궁화 꽃이 피던 날) (Note: lit. The day hibiscus bloomed. The English title references the game Red Light, Green Light. The Korean title references the Korean version of the game.)	Hwang Dong-hyuk	Hwang Dong-hyuk	September 17, 2021
Seong Gi-hun is down on his luck, having accumulated enormous debts to loan sharks while becoming estranged from his daughter and ex-wife. In a subway station, a man in a suit and tie invites him to play a game of ddakji for money and offers an opportunity to participate in higher-stakes games, and was given a card with a number. Gi-hun initially declines but reconsiders after discovering that his daughter will leave for the United States with her stepfather if he does not make more money. Gi-hun soon calls the card and was told to arrive at a location, and when he did, a van approached him and sedated him. He awakens in a dormitory with 455 others, identified only by the number on their dark green tracksuits. A group of masked guards in pink jumpsuits arrives and explains that the players, all in dire financial straits, will be awarded billions of won in prize money if they can win six games over six days. The games are overseen by a masked figure dressed in all black known as the Front Man. Gi-hun befriends Player 001, an elderly man suffering from a brain tumor, and recognizes two of the other players: Cho Sang-woo, a childhood classmate turned investment broker, and Player 067, a pickpocket who previously stole from him. The first game is Red Light, Green Light, where anyone caught moving is shot dead on sight, revealing the sadistic nature of the games. Half of the players panic and attempt to flee upon realizing this, and are massacred. With help from Sang-woo and Player 199, Gi-hun and several others just barely make it out of the first game alive.
2	2	"Hell"; Transliteration: "Jiok" (Korean: 지옥)	Hwang Dong-hyuk	Hwang Dong-hyuk	September 17, 2021
With over half of the players killed in the first game, many survivors demand to be released. Using the game's third clause, they narrowly vote to end the games and return home, though without any prize money. Back in Seoul, Gi-hun attempts to report the games to the police, but only Detective Hwang Jun-ho, whose brother disappeared after receiving a similar invitation, believes him. The players are invited to re-enter the game, and many return out of desperation. Among them are Gi-hun, whose mother needs surgery; Sang-woo, who faces arrest for financial fraud; Player 001, who does not wish to die in the outside world; Player 067, who wishes to extract her mother from North Korea and bring her brother, Cheol, out of an orphanage; Player 199, a Pakistani migrant worker who violently attacked his boss for withholding his wages; and Player 101, named Jang Deok-su, a gangster fleeing gambling debts and his former bosses. Jun-ho secretly follows Gi-hun when the guards pick him up.
3	3	"The Man with the Umbrella"; Transliteration: "Usaneul sseun namja" (Korean: 우산을 쓴 남자)	Hwang Dong-hyuk	Hwang Dong-hyuk	September 17, 2021
Jun-ho successfully infiltrates the games by disguising himself as a masked worker, discovering that the workers and players are based in a facility on a remote island. The players, now more aware and prepared, begin forming alliances. Gi-hun, Sang-woo, Player 001, and Player 199 team up. Player 067 sneaks into an air vent and witnesses workers melting pots of sugar. The second game, Ppopgi, requires each player to extract a stamped shape from a dalgona (sugar candy wafer) within 10 minutes without breaking it. Sang-woo learns of Player 067's discovery and recognizes the game beforehand, but does not warn his teammates and chooses the easiest shape for himself. Gi-hun unknowingly chooses the most difficult shape, an umbrella, but ultimately succeeds by licking the back of his dalgona to dissolve it and weaken the seams. Player 212, a rowdy and manipulative woman, helps Deok-su complete the game with a smuggled lighter. Player 119, about to be executed, stabs one guard in the eye and forces another to unmask after shooting and wounding him. Shocked to discover the guard is a young man, Player 119 shoots himself; the Front Man then personally executes the guard for revealing his identity.
4	4	"Stick to the Team"; Transliteration: "Jjollyeodo pyeonmeokgi" (Korean: 쫄려도 편먹기)	Hwang Dong-hyuk	Hwang Dong-hyuk	September 17, 2021
Player 111, a disgraced doctor, secretly works with a group of guards to harvest organs from deceased players to sell on the black market in return for information on upcoming games. When Deok-su kills a player who accuses him of taking extra food, the guards take no action, and the prize pool is increased. Realizing they can freely kill other players to raise the prize pool, Deok-su and his group instigate a brawl after lights out, resulting in players attacking each other. Gi-hun's group survives and exchanges names to build trust: Player 199 is Ali Abdul, and Player 067 is Kang Sae-byeok. Due to his brain tumor, Player 001 struggles to remember his name. Player 212, named Han Mi-nyeo, has sex with Deok-su in the toilets. In the third game, players are instructed to form groups of ten. For Gi-hun's team, Sae-byeok recruits Player 240, a young woman near her age. The game is revealed to be a tug of war on two raised platforms, where a team wins by pulling the opposing team off the other platform to their deaths. Deok-su, having learned about the game from Player 111, selects only strong men and rejects Mi-nyeo, who joins Gi-hun's team. After Deok-su's team wins their match easily, Gi-hun's team struggles against another all-male team.
5	5	"A Fair World"; Transliteration: "Pyeongdeunghan sesang" (Korean: 평등한 세상)	Hwang Dong-hyuk	Hwang Dong-hyuk	September 17, 2021
Gi-hun's team wins their tug of war match through Player 001's strategy and Sang-woo's quick thinking. Anticipating another riot, they build a barricade and take turns on guard overnight, though Deok-su's team does not attack. Gi-hun reflects on an incident when he and his former coworkers at an automobile factory protested mass layoffs, which was the beginning of the hard times that had befallen him. Player 240 tries to befriend Sae-byeok, but she remains distant. Meanwhile, Jun-ho witnesses the organ harvesting racket and realizes that the guard whose identity he assumed took part in it. Player 111 turns against the racketeers after the guards are unaware of the next game, and all involved, except Jun-ho, are killed, including Player 111. The Front Man launches a manhunt for Jun-ho, who breaks into his office. There, Jun-ho discovers that the games have been operating for over 30 years and that his missing brother, Hwang In-ho, was the winner of the 2015 iteration.
6	6	"Gganbu"; Transliteration: "Kkanbu" (Korean: 깐부)	Hwang Dong-hyuk	Hwang Dong-hyuk	September 17, 2021
The players are shown the bodies of Player 111 and his co-conspirators, who were executed for cheating, and are reassured that the games are designed to ensure a fair chance for all participants. In the fourth game, players are instructed to pair up, only to be told afterwards that they must compete against their partner in a marble game of their choice; the goal is to collect all of the partner's marbles within thirty minutes to survive. Sae-byeok and Player 240, Ji-yeong, exchange life stories; Ji-yeong, believing Sae-byeok has more to live for, sacrifices herself. Sang-woo deceives Ali into forfeiting his marbles and wins. Deok-su wins against his partner and henchman, Player 278. Gi-hun exploits Player 001's dementia to win, only to learn that the old man, named Oh Il-nam, was aware of the deception all along. Il-nam, who regards Gi-hun as his gganbu (trusted friend), allows him to win. Gi-hun and Sae-byeok are left devastated by the deaths of their friends.
7	7	"VIPS"	Hwang Dong-hyuk	Hwang Dong-hyuk	September 17, 2021
The players return to find Mi-nyeo, who lacked a partner for the next game, still alive, having been given a free pass to the next game due to Player 111's death leaving an odd number of players left. Foreign VIPs, who had been remotely betting on the games, arrive to watch and wager on the remaining rounds live. Jun-ho, disguised as one of the masked servants, is propositioned by a VIP. In a private room, he attacks the VIP and records his confession before escaping the island. Meanwhile, in the fifth game, players must cross a two-panel-wide bridge; one panel at each step is made of strong tempered glass, while the other is made of ordinary glass that will break under a player's weight. Players at the front of the line fall to their deaths as they cross the panels. Deok-su, refusing to move despite the clock ticking, pressures others to test the panels before him. As revenge, Mi-nyeo sacrifices herself to pull him down with her to their deaths. Player 017, a seasoned glass worker, identifies the safe panels until the Front Man turns off the lights, removing his advantage. With time running out, Sang-woo pushes Player 017 to his death, revealing the last tempered panel. Only Gi-hun, Sang-woo, and Sae-byeok complete the game, but explosions shatter the remaining panels, injuring the three in a rain of shards.
8	8	"Front Man"; Transliteration: "Peuronteumaen" (Korean: 프론트맨)	Hwang Dong-hyuk	Hwang Dong-hyuk	September 17, 2021
As finalists, Gi-hun, Sang-woo, and Sae-byeok are given formal outfits and are treated to a candlelit dinner provided by the guards. Sae-byeok hides a severe laceration sustained in the glass bridge explosion. Having now witnessed the lengths Sang-woo will go to win, Gi-hun suggests an alliance with Sae-byeok to oppose him. Sae-byeok, however, instead begs Gi-hun to promise that the winner will look after the other's loved ones. Gi-hun goes to kill Sang-woo while he sleeps, but Sae-byeok stops him, telling him he is not a murderer. Sae-byeok's injury worsens, prompting Gi-hun to call for help, but while he is away, Sang-woo stabs Sae-byeok with his leftover steak knife from the dinner, and the guards arrive only to collect her body. Furious and heartbroken, Gi-hun tries to attack Sang-woo but is stopped by the guards. Meanwhile, Jun-ho reaches another island but is quickly tracked by the Front Man, who reveals himself to be Jun-ho's brother, In-ho, and attempts to recruit him. When Jun-ho refuses, In-ho shoots him in the shoulder, causing him to fall over a cliff into the sea.
9	9	"One Lucky Day"; Transliteration: "Unsu joeun nal" (Korean: 운수 좋은 날) (Note: The title is a reference to the 1924 Korean novel with the same name that tells the story of a rickshaw man initially being happy earning a lot of money from having a lot of customers on a rainy day, and thrilled to buy his wife some soup, only to find his wife dead in her house.)	Hwang Dong-hyuk	Hwang Dong-hyuk	September 17, 2021
In the final eponymous Squid game, Gi-hun defeats Sang-woo after a brutal fight but refuses to kill him, instead begging him to stop the game using the third clause. Sang-woo declines, and asks Gi-hun to take care of his mother before stabbing himself, making Gi-hun automatically the winner by default. Gi-hun is returned to Seoul with a bank card to access the prize money, only to learn his mother died some time after he re-entered the games. A year later, still traumatized and unwilling to use the money out of guilt, Gi-hun receives an invitation card from "Gganbu" and is shocked to find a declining Il-nam on his deathbed. Il-nam reveals he created the game to entertain the bored and wealthy like himself, choosing childhood games and participating in Gi-hun's group for nostalgia. As they talk, Il-nam wagers with Gi-hun on whether an unconscious man in the street will be helped before midnight. The man is helped just in time, but Il-nam dies shortly after. Gi-hun retrieves Sae-byeok's brother and arranges for Sang-woo's mother to care for him after giving them a share of the prize money. On the way to the airport to reconnect with his daughter in Los Angeles, Gi-hun sees the same game recruiter playing ddakji with a new player and manages to take the player's invitation card. He calls the card's number before boarding his plane, demanding to know who is behind the games. The Front Man answers, ordering Gi-hun to board his flight, but Gi-hun ends the call and returns to the terminal.

== Cast and characters ==
Numbers in parentheses denote the character's assigned player number in the Squid Game universe.

=== Main cast ===
- Lee Jung-jae as Seong Gi-hun (성기훈; [sʰʌŋ.ɡi.βun], 456),
- Park Hae-soo as Cho Sang-woo (조상우; [tɕo.saŋ.u], 218 (Note: Hwang Dong-Hyuk said the number was actually a pun using the fact that "two-eighteen" in Korean is i-sibpal (이십팔), similar to the Korean swear word ssibal (씨발, "fucker").)),
- Lee Byung-hun as Hwang In-ho, the Front Man
- O Yeong-su as Oh Il-nam (오일남; [o.iɭ.ɭam], 001),
- Jung Ho-yeon as Kang Sae-byeok (강새벽; [kaŋ.sːɛ.bjʌk̚], 067),
- Heo Sung-tae as Jang Deok-su (장덕수; [tɕaŋ.dʌk.s͈u], 101),
- Anupam Tripathi as Ali Abdul (알리 압둘, 199),
- Kim Joo-ryoung as Han Mi-nyeo (한미녀; [han.mi.njʌ], 212),

=== Special guest stars ===
- Gong Yoo as the Recruiter, a salesman who finds participants for the Game

=== Recurring cast ===
- Wi Ha-joon as Hwang Jun-ho (황준호),
- Yoo Sung-joo as Byeong-gi (병기; [pjʌŋ.gi], 111),
- Lee Yoo-mi as Ji-yeong (지영, 240),
- Kim Young-ok as Oh Mal-soon, Gi-hun's mother
- Cho Ah-in as Seong Ga-yeong, Gi-hun's daughter
- Lee Seo-hwan as Park Jung-bae, Gi-hun's best friend
- Kang Mal-geum as Kang Eun-ji, Gi-hun's ex-wife and Ga-yeong's mother
- Park Hye-jin as Sang-woo's mother
- Park Si-wan as Kang Cheol, the younger brother of Kang Sae-byeok
- Kim Si-hyun as Player 244, a pastor
- Lee Sang-hee as Do Jung-soo, a glass maker who has been making glass for over 30 years (도정수, 017),
- Kim Yun-tae as Player 069, the husband of Player 070
- Lee Ji-ha as Player 070, the wife of Player 069
- Kwak Ja-hyoung as Player 278
- Christian Lagahit as Player 276
- John D Michaels as VIP #1
- Daniel C Kennedy as VIP #2
- David Lee as VIP #3
- Geoffrey Giuliano as VIP #4
- Stephane Mot as VIP #5
- Michael Davis as VIP #6

=== Guest cast ===
- Kim Pub-lae as Mr. Kim, a loan shark
- Choi Jae-sup as Park Man-cheol, a broker
- Lee Jung-jun as Young Guard

== Production ==
=== Development ===
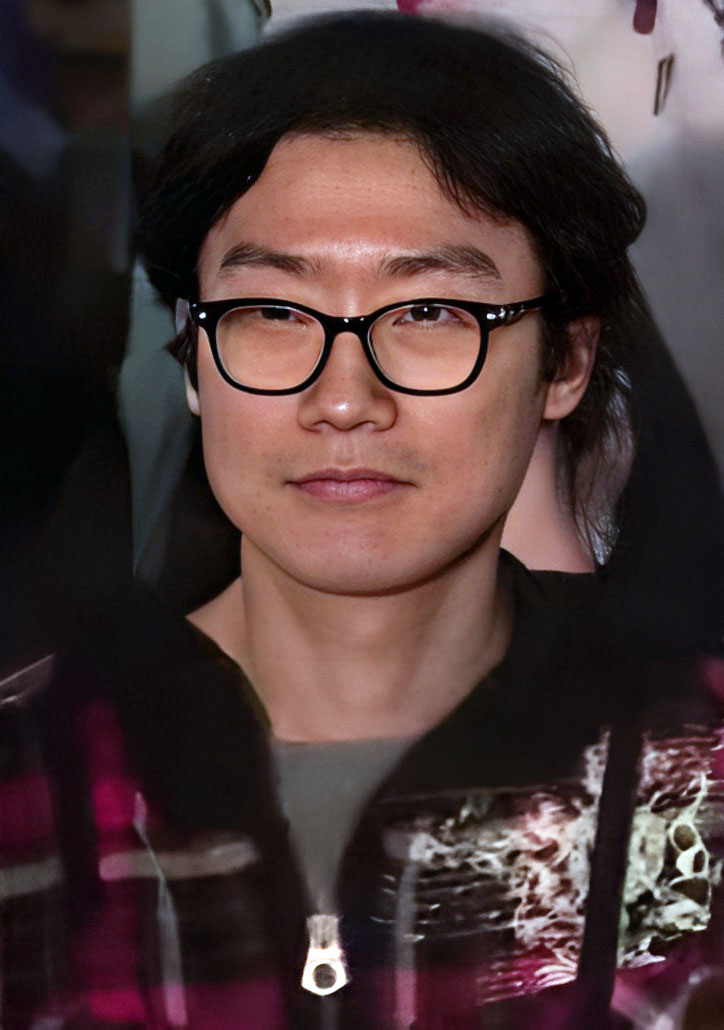
Series creator and director Hwang Dong-hyuk

Around 2008, Hwang Dong-hyuk tried unsuccessfully to get investment for a different movie script that he had written, and he, his mother, and his grandmother had to take out loans to stay afloat, but still struggled amid the debt crisis within the country. (Note: Following the bankruptcy of Lehman Brothers in September 2008 and as part of the 2008 financial crisis, banks in South Korea had tried to help provide external investments to stabilize foreign currency rates. As the crisis worsened into 2009, these stabilization attempts had failed, causing a reversing of money from the country, and forcing banks to drastically increase interest rates and seek high-risk short-term loans made to citizens to try to recover.) He spent his free time in a manhwabang (South Korean comic cafe) reading Japanese survival manga such as Battle Royale, Liar Game and Gambling Apocalypse: Kaiji. Hwang compared the characters' situation in these works to his own current situation and considered the idea of being able to join such a survival game to win money to get him out of debt, leading him to write a film script on that concept throughout 2009. Hwang stated, "I wanted to write a story that was an allegory or fable about modern capitalist society, something that depicts an extreme competition, somewhat like the extreme competition of life. But I wanted it to use the kind of characters we've all met in real life." Hwang feared the storyline was "too difficult to understand and bizarre" at the time. Hwang tried to sell his story to various South Korean production groups and actors, but had been told it was too grotesque and unrealistic. Hwang put this script aside and over the next ten years successfully completed three other films. including the crime drama film Silenced (2011) and the historical drama film The Fortress (2017).

In the 2010s, Netflix had seen a large growth in viewership outside of North America, and started investing in productions in other regions, including South Korea. In 2018, Ted Sarandos, co-CEO of Netflix, stated that they were looking for more successes from overseas productions: "The exciting thing for me would be if the next Stranger Things came from outside America. Right now, historically, nothing of that scale has ever come from anywhere but Hollywood." Netflix had opened up a division in Asia in 2018, and while they were still operating out of temporary leased office space in Seoul, Hwang brought his script to their attention. Kim Minyoung, one of Netflix's content officers for the Asian regions, recognized Hwang's talent from The Fortress and his other films, and upon seeing his script for Squid Game, knew they needed it for the service. Kim said "[W]e were looking for shows that were different from what's traditionally 'made it,' and Squid Game was exactly it". In September 2019 Netflix formally announced that they would produce Hwang's work as an original series. Netflix's Bela Bajaria, head of global television operations, said of their interest in Hwang's work that "we knew it was going to be big in Korea because it had a well-regarded director with a bold vision", and that "K-Dramas also travel well across Asia". Regarding his return to the project, Hwang commented, "It's a sad story. But the reason why I returned to the project is because the world 10 years from then has transformed to a place where these unbelievable survival stories are so fitting, and I found that this is the time when people will call these stories intriguing and realistic." Hwang further believed that the COVID-19 pandemic impacted the economic disparity between classes in South Korea, and said that "All of these points made the story very realistic for people compared to a decade ago".

With the Netflix order, the film concept was expanded out to a nine-episode series. Kim stated that there was "so much more than what was written in the 120-minute format. So we worked together to turn it into a series." Hwang said he was able to expand the script so that it "could focus on the relationships between people [and] the stories that each of the people had". Initially, Netflix had named the series Round Six, rather than Squid Game as Hwang had suggested; according to Netflix's vice president for content in Asia Kim Minyoung, while they knew that the name "squid game" would be familiar to Korean viewers from the children's game, it "wouldn't resonate because not many people would get it", and opted to use Round Six (stylized as Round 6) as it self-described the nature of the competition. It has been titled as such in Brazil (possibly while also avoiding any political connotation to do with Lula). As production continued, Hwang pushed on the service to use Squid Game instead; its cryptic name and unique visuals helped to draw in curious viewers, according to Kim. At the time that Hwang wrote the series, his goal was to have the series reach the most-watched show in Netflix in the United States for at least one day. Hwang had initially written the series as eight episodes, which was comparable to other Netflix shows, but found that the material for the last episode was longer than he planned, so it was split into two.

=== Writing ===
Hwang described the work as "a story about losers". The names of the characters – Seong Gi-hun, Cho Sang-woo, and Il-nam – were all based on Hwang's childhood friends, as well as the character name Hwang Jun-ho, who was also a childhood friend in real life with an older brother named Hwang In-ho. The two main characters Gi-hun and Sang-woo were based on Hwang's own personal experiences and represented "two sides" of himself; Gi-hun shared the same aspects of being raised by an economically disadvantaged single mother in the Ssangmun district of Seoul, while Sang-woo reflected on Hwang having attended Seoul National University with high expectations from his family and neighborhood. Further, Gi-hun's background was inspired by the organizers of the SsangYong Motor labor strike of 2009 against mass layoffs.

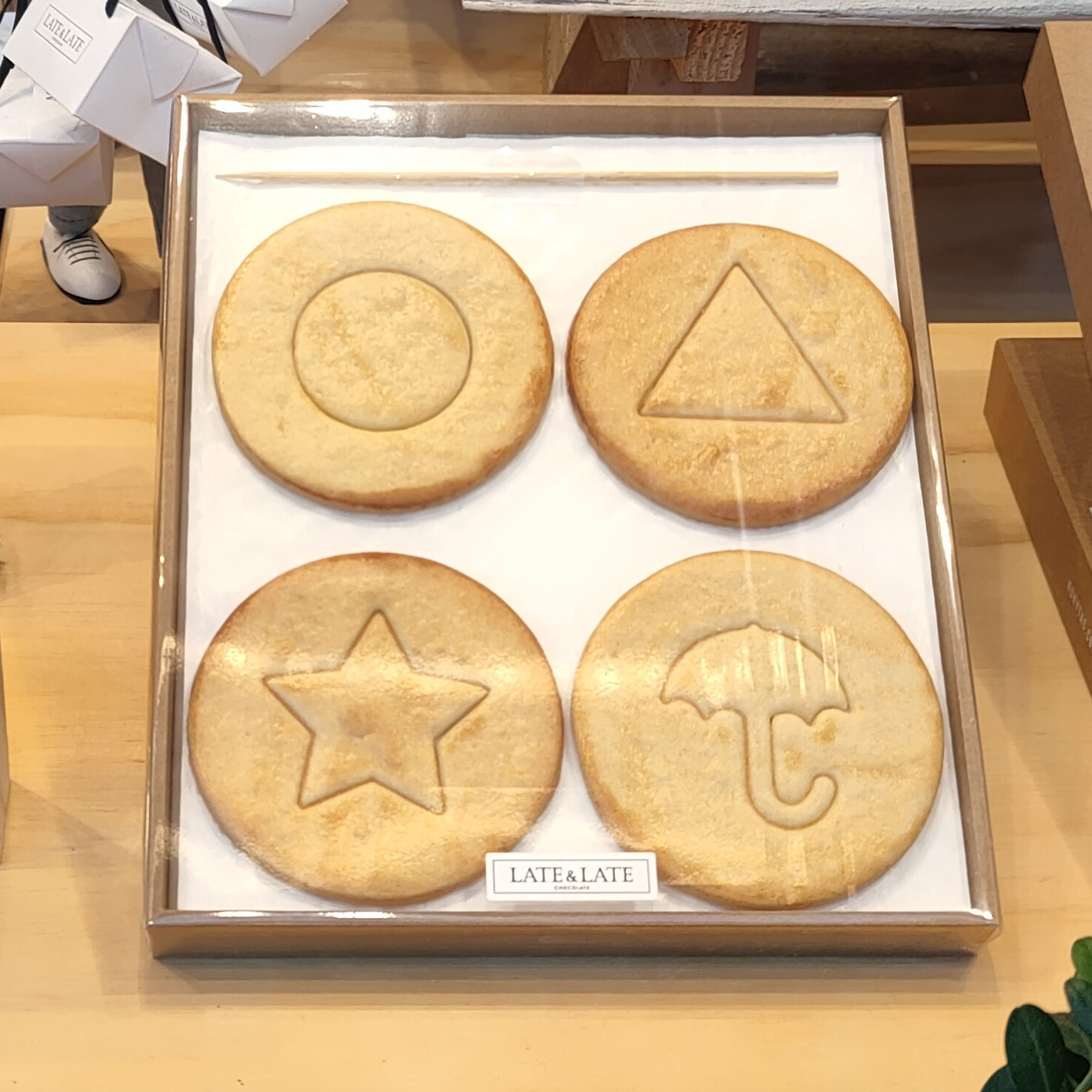
Shapes punched into dalgona, a Korean sugar candy treat, based on the shapes used in the second game of the season. Within the season, players had to extract the inner shapes intact.

Hwang based the narrative on Korean games of his childhood to show the irony of a childhood game where competition was not important becoming an extreme competition with people's lives at stake. Additionally, as his initial script was intended for film, he opted to use children's games with simple rules that were easy to explain in contrast to other survival-type films using games with complex rules. The central game he selected, the squid game, was a popular Korean children's game from the 1970s and 1980s. Hwang recalled the squid game as "the most physically aggressive childhood game I played in neighborhood alleys as a kid, which is why I also loved it the most", and because of this "it's the most symbolic game that reflects today's competitive society, so I picked it out as The season's title". The colors of the ddakjis in the initial game, which are blue and red, were inspired from the Korean and Japanese urban legend "blue paper, red paper". (Note: Blue paper, red paper", also known by its Japanese name "Akai-Kami-Aoi-Kami", is an urban legend that started from Japan that was later spread to South Korea. The legend is about a ghost that haunts the toilets and is known to ask the question, "Do you want blue toilet paper or red toilet paper?". Either option will result in the death of the person. Unlike the Korean versions, the ghost of the Japanese story has a name called "Aka Manto".) The "Red light, Green light" game was selected because of its potential to make a lot of losers in one go. Regarding the selection, Hwang said, "The game was selected because the scene filled with so many people randomly moving and stopping could be viewed as a ridiculous but a sad group dance." Hwang joked that the dalgona candy game they chose may influence sales of dalgona, similar to how sales of Korean gats (traditional hats) bloomed after the broadcast of Netflix's series Kingdom. Licking the candy to free the shape was something that Hwang said that he had done as a child and brought it into the script. Hwang had considered other Korean children's games such as Gonggi, Dong, Dong, Dongdaemun, and Why did you come to my house? (우리 집에 왜 왔니?, a Korean variant of the Hana Ichi Monme), the former later being used in the second season.

Hwang wrote all of the season himself, taking nearly six months to write the first two episodes alone, after which he turned to friends to get input on moving forward. Hwang also addressed the physical and mental challenges in the creation of the season, saying that he had forgone dental health while making it, and had to have six teeth pulled by his dentist after production was complete. As such, Hwang was initially unsure about a sequel after completing these episodes, though he wrote the ending to keep a potential hook for a sequel in mind. Hwang had considered an alternate ending where Gi-hun would have boarded the plane after concluding his call with the game organizers to see his daughter, but Hwang said of that ending, "Is that the right way for us to really propose the question or the message that we wanted to convey through the season?"

=== Casting ===
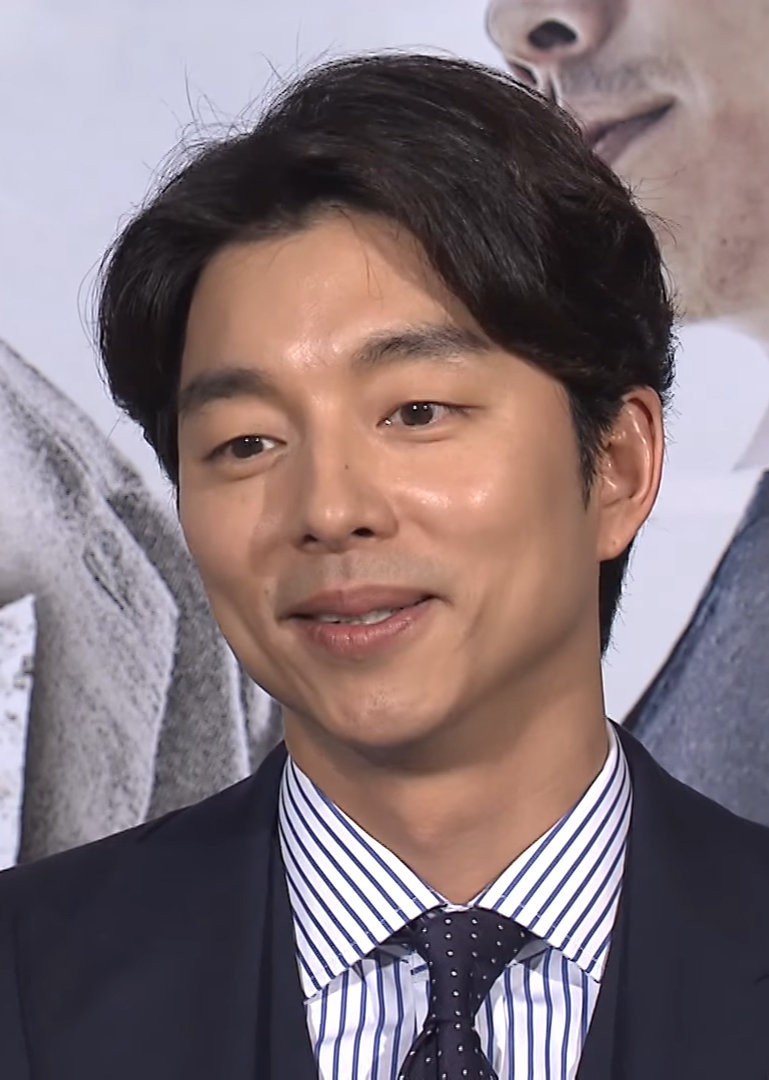
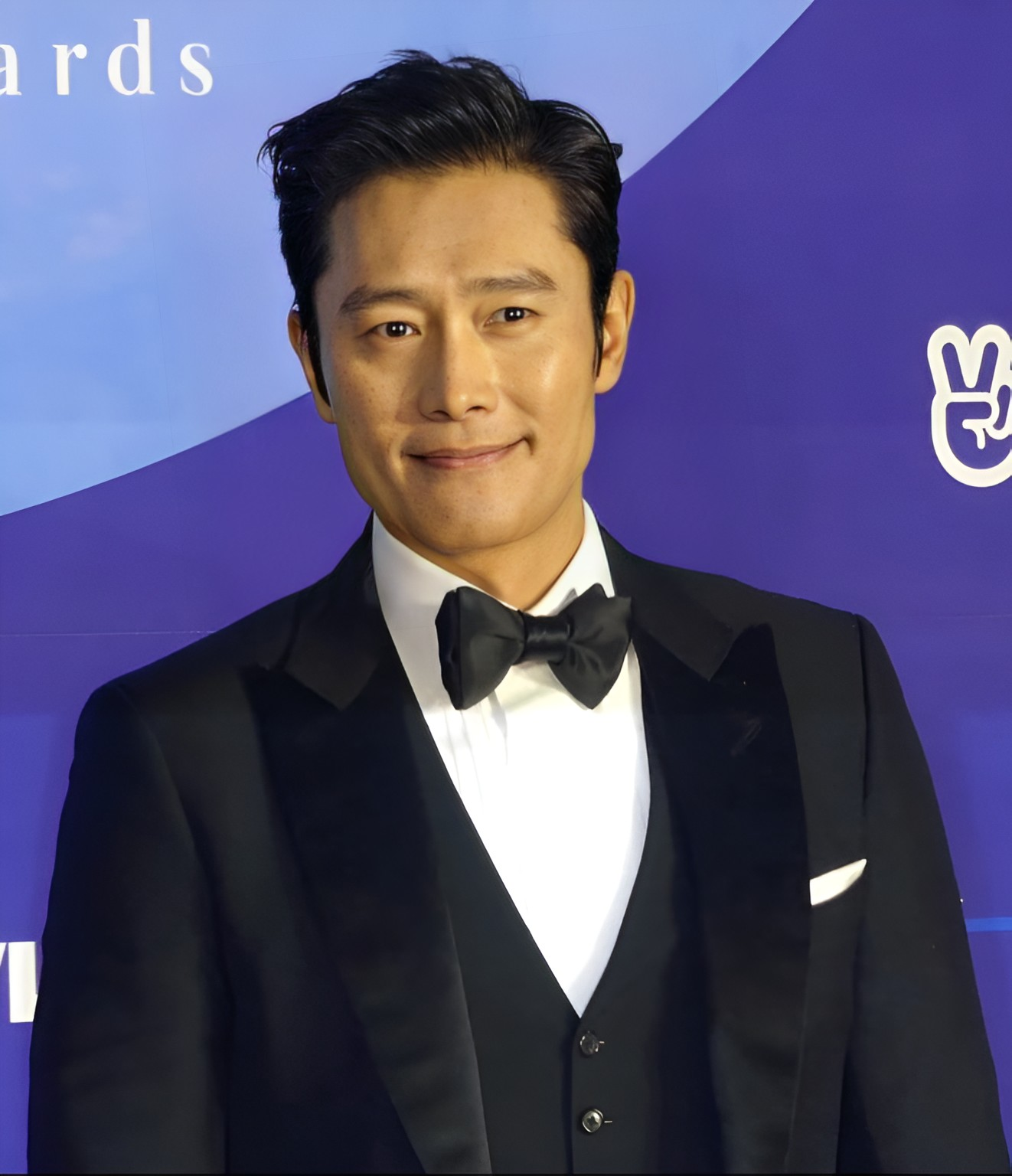
Director Hwang requested that actors Gong Yoo (left) and Lee Byung-hun (right), with whom he had previously worked, appear as the Recruiter and the Front Man, respectively, in Squid Game.

Casting for the season was confirmed on June 17, 2020.

Hwang said he chose to cast Lee Jung-jae as Gi-hun as to "destroy his charismatic image portrayed in his previous roles". HoYeon Jung was requested by her new management company to send a video to audition for the season while she was finishing a shoot in Mexico and preparing for New York Fashion Week. Although this was her first audition as an actor and her expectations were low, Hwang said, "The moment I saw her audition tape from New York, I immediately thought to myself, 'this is the girl we want.' My first impression of her was that she is wild and free like an untamed horse".

On casting Anupam Tripathi as Ali Abdul, Hwang said, "It was hard to find good foreign actors in Korea." He chose Anupam Tripathi because of his emotional acting capabilities and fluency in Korean. Both Gong Yoo and Lee Byung Hun had worked with Hwang during his previous films, Silenced and The Fortress respectively, and Hwang had asked both to appear in small roles within Squid Game.

The VIPs were selected from non-Korean actors living in Asia; in the case of Geoffrey Giuliano, who played the VIP that interacted with Jun-ho, his prior role from Train to Busan Presents: Peninsula led to his casting for Squid Game.

=== Costume, set design, and filming ===
External videos
- Squid Game – Behind the Scenes, from Netflix

Production and filming of the season ran from June to October 2020, including a mandatory month-long break due to the COVID-19 pandemic. City scenes were filmed in Daejeon, while the island set pieces were filmed on Seongapdo located in Ongjin.

The shapes of Ojingo (Squid) played heavily in the graphic design of the season.

As Netflix was targeting the work for a global audience, the visuals were emphasized and some of the rules of the children's games were simplified to avoid potential issues with the language barrier. The colorful sets and costumes were designed to look like a fantasy world. The players and soldiers each wear a distinctive color, to reduce the sense of individuality and emphasize the difference between the two groups. The green tracksuits worn by the players were inspired by 1970s athletic wear, known as trainingbok (Korean: 트레이닝복). The maze-like corridors and stairs drew inspiration from the 4-dimensional stair drawings of M. C. Escher including Relativity. Production designer Chae Kyoung-sun said these seemingly infinite stairways represented "a form of bondage for the contestants". The complex network of tunnels between the arena, the dorm, and the administrative office was inspired by ant colonies.

Chae was also inspired by the Saemaul Undong political initiative of the 1970s aimed to modernize rural Korean villages. The mint green and pink color theme throughout the season were a common theme from Korean schools in the 1970s and 1980s. Green-suited characters develop associations of fear with pink through its use in guard outfits and the stairway room.

The players' dormitory was envisioned with the concept of "people who are abandoned on the road" according to Chae; this was also used in the tug-of-war game. The room was designed using white tiles and the curved opening like a vehicular tunnel. The bed and stairs initially were laid out to look like warehouse shelves, but as the episodes progressed and these furnishing used as makeshift defenses, they took the appearance of broken ladders and stairs, implying the way these players were trapped with no way out, according to Chae. The dinner scene that took place in the eighth episode was inspired by the art installation The Dinner Party by Judy Chicago. Walls of many of the areas where the games took place were painted in skies inspired by The Empire of Light series by René Magritte.

The crew spent the most time crafting the set for the Marbles game, creating a mix of realism and fakeness as to mirror the life and death nature of the games themselves. Chae stated that this set was designed as a combination of small theatrical stages, each stage representing parts of Player 001's memories. The VIP room was one of the last pieces to be designed, and Chae said that they decided on an animal-based theme for both the costumes and room for this; "The VIPs are the kind of people who take other people's lives for entertainment and treat them like game pieces on a chessboard, so I wanted to create a powerful and instinctive look for the room."

Most sets were a combination of practical sets and chroma key backgrounds. For example, in the Glass Stepping Stones scenes, the set, designed as if in a circus tent for the players performing for the VIPs, was only 1.5 metres (4.9 ft) off the ground, using chroma key screens to simulate the height in post-production. In filming, this was far enough from the ground to make the actors nervous, which contributed to the scene. The tug-of-war set was actually set more than 10 metres (33 ft) off the ground, which further created anxiety for some of the actors with fears of heights.

Throughout the series, the trio of circle, triangle, and square shapes appear frequently on the cards given to recruit players, on the guards' masks, and in the show's title card in most language adaptations. These are shapes associated with the playing field for the children's game of Squid (ojingeo). They are also used to represent the hierarchy of the guards within the complex. Following from the comparison with an ant colony, the guards with circles are considered the workers, triangles as the soldiers, and squares as the managers (see also: Korean honorifics).

=== Music ===
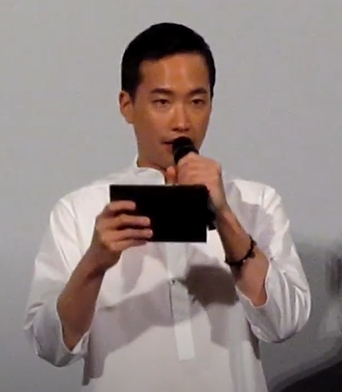
Jung Jae-il composed the score for the season.

Jung Jae-il, who previously composed the soundtrack for Parasite, composed and directed Squid Game's score. To prevent it from becoming boring, he asked the help of composers Park Min-ju, and Kim Sung-soo, a music director for musicals who uses the stage name "23" as a composer.

Two classical music pieces are also used throughout the season as part of the players' routine: the third movement of Joseph Haydn's "Trumpet Concerto" is used to wake the players, and Johann Strauss II's "The Blue Danube" is used to indicate the start of a new game. Ludwig van Beethoven's "Fifth Symphony" is also heard in the VIP lounge. A cover of "Fly Me to the Moon", (Note: Hwang revealed that the music figures used for the project were the ones in the gas station where he wrote the script, and that they were playing "Fly Me to the Moon", and this is why he used the music for the show.) arranged by Jung and sung by Korean artist Joo Won Shin, was used over the "Red Light, Green Light" game of the first episode; according to Joo, Hwang wanted a contrast between the brutal killing of the players and the "romantic and beautiful lyrics and melody" of the song, such that the scene "embodies the increasingly polarized capitalist society that we live in today in a very compressed and cynical way".

For the song "Way Back Then" that accompanies children playing Squid Game, Jung wanted to use instruments that he practiced in elementary school, such as recorders and castanets. The rhythm of the song is based on a 3-3-7 clapping rhythm that is commonly used in South Korea to cheer someone on. The recorder, played by Jung himself, had a slight "beep", which was unintentional. The song "Round VI" was played by the Budapest Scoring Orchestra.

The soundtrack was released on September 17, 2021.

== Marketing ==
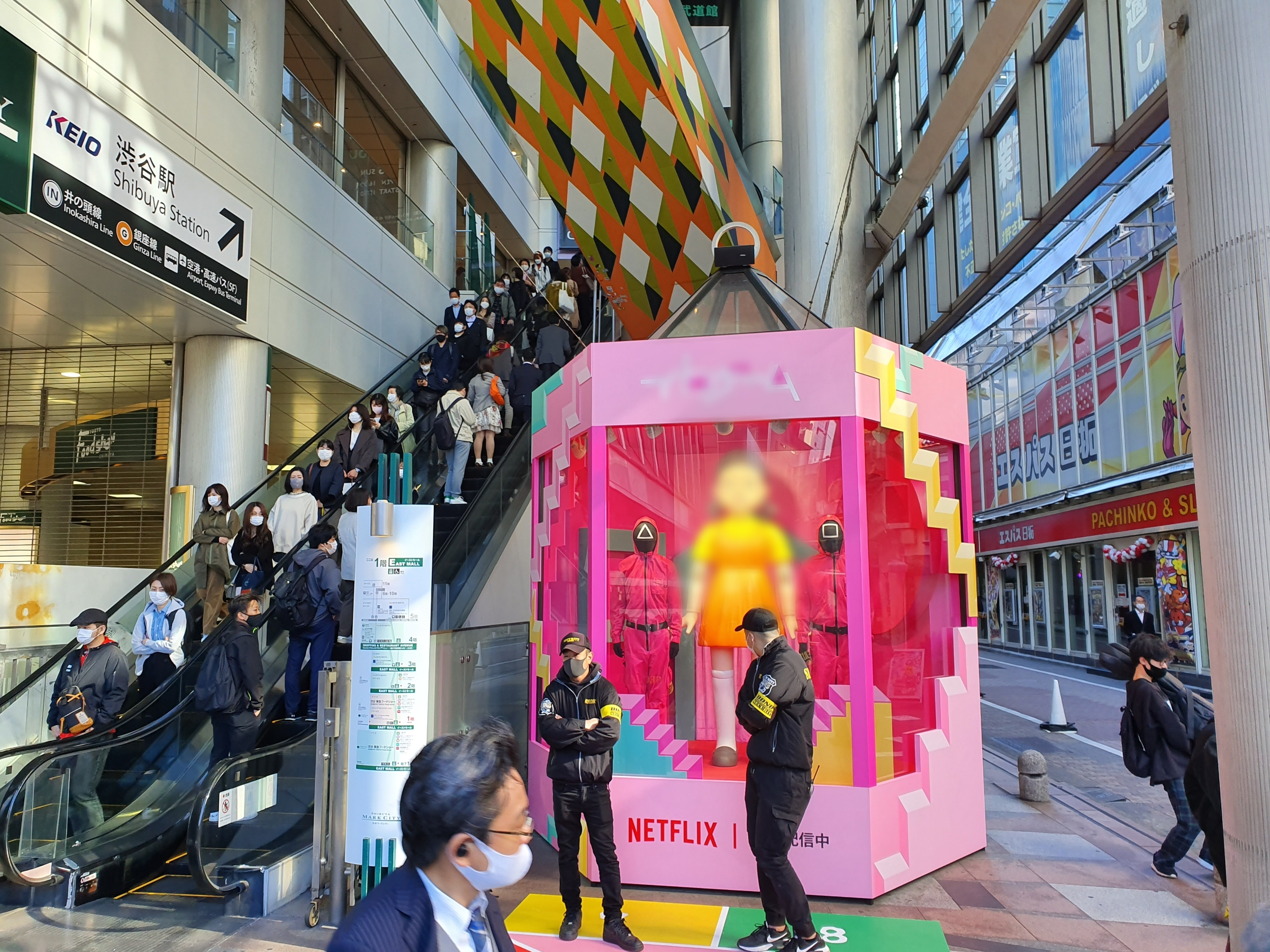
A promotional event for Squid Game in Shibuya, Tokyo

In the Philippines, a replica of the doll used in the episode one of the season was exhibited on Ortigas Avenue in Quezon City in September 2021.

A Squid Game doll was installed in Olympic Park, Seoul on October 25, 2021. A replica of Squid Game's set was exhibited at the Itaewon station in Seoul since September 5, 2021. However, the exhibit was prematurely closed due to COVID-19 concerns.

A Squid Game pop-up store opened in Paris on October 2 and 3, 2021, and a person could win a free one-month Netflix subscription if they managed to get the right shape from the dalgona in one minute and 30 seconds.

In the Netherlands, Netflix hosted its own Squid Game where people were able to play the game Red Light, Green Light in both Maastricht and Rotterdam. A replica of the doll was exhibited and staff were dressed as guards. Winners were awarded with Squid Game memorabilia. The event attracted hundreds of people. Similar events featuring replicas of the doll occurred across the world, including Sydney and the United Kingdom.

In October 2021, the Hollywood Reporter interviewed Netflix Asia's executive Kim Minyoung, who said that the company was looking into a possible video game adaptation of the season.

Netflix has licensed Squid Game for merchandising. A Young-hee vinyl figure was released in January 2022. Funko released a set of Squid Game themed Funko Pop! figurines in May 2022.

== Themes and analysis ==
=== Capitalism and economic disparity ===
Hwang wrote Squid Game based on his own personal experiences and observations of capitalism and economic class struggles within South Korea. Hwang also considered that his script was targeted towards global issues regarding capitalism, stating, "I wanted to create something that would resonate not just for Korean people but globally. This was my dream." He added, "I do believe that the overall global economic order is unequal and that around 90% of the people believe that it's unfair. During the pandemic, poorer countries can't get their people vaccinated. They're contracting viruses on the streets and even dying. So I did try to convey a message about modern capitalism. As I said, it's not profound."

Commentators agreed that these themes applied to capitalism across the globe today. The Guardian's Nemo Kim and Justin McCurry describe that the situation that many of the players in Squid Game leading to their debt reflects the reality of the South Korean personal debt crisis, which had exceeded 100% of the country's gross domestic product at the time the show first broadcast. Rising debt had led to the government placing restrictions on borrowing practices to try to prevent people from falling further in debt, but this itself had the impact of making other borrowers finding themselves unable to pay back loans without taking out higher-interest loans, creating a rapid cascading effect. Many Koreans in these situations, often named as the "dirt spoon" class, engage in risky propositions, such as high-risk investments, cryptocurrency, or gambling, anticipating a big payoff but end up further in debt and exacerbating their problem, according to The Associated Press's Kim Tong-Hyung. The use of trainingbok outfits for the players was said to allude to their connotation with baeksu, roughly translated as "white hands", people that have not attained financial independence and as a result are discriminated against by society, spending their days idle and doing no work, according to Indiana University professor Jooyoung Shin.

Brian Lowry of CNN wrote that the season "presents a visually arresting variation on themes seen plenty of times before, which include tapping into the class divide – and the rich essentially preying on the poor and destitute – at a moment when the audience might be more receptive to that message". Henry Wong of The Guardian compared the season favorably to the 2019 South Korean film Parasite, and said that the show used the "present-day, very real wealth inequality" in South Korea as a backdrop to keep the viewer interested in its characters. Caitlyn Clark of American socialist magazine Jacobin also compared the season favorably to Parasite and said that it "shreds the capitalist myth that hard work guarantees prosperity". Melanie McFarland of the American liberal website Salon.com described the season as "an excellent distillation of how predatory capitalism works". E. Tammy Kim of American progressive magazine The Nation wrote: "Squid Game is not a subtle show, either in its politics or plot. Capitalism is bloody and mean and relentless; it yells." Morgan Ome of The Atlantic wrote that the season "fits into a category of South Korean works that grapple with economic anxieties and class struggles, which are rooted in the country's concerns but resonate globally", adding that it "indicts the rich for propagating a false sense of upward mobility and the poor for buying into it".

Zach Weissmueller of American libertarian magazine Reason argued against an anti-capitalist interpretation of the season, saying that "Squid Game isn't really about capitalism, properly understood. It's about developing strategies for undermining and resisting authoritarian control and retaining your humanity under a system designed to strip it all away."

As the season was introduced ahead of the 2022 South Korean presidential election, several of the candidates began using some of the Squid Game imagery in their political ads and challenging opponents to similar games, as well as using the themes of the series related to economic disparity as part of their political platform. The Korean Confederation of Trade Unions used outfits and imagery based on Squid Game as part of its messaging and demonstrations against the current economic disparity in South Korea. Closer to the election, the campaign had become drowned in more mudslinging, with the various candidates calling out others through insulting names and asserting that those that lost would be sent to jail, and as a result the campaign period became known as the "Squid Game Campaign". A North Korean state-run website, 'Arirang Meari', used Squid Game to critically mock the economic situation in South Korea, saying that it exposes the "beastly" nature of the "South Korean capitalist society where mankind is annihilated by extreme competition", and describes South Korea as a country where "corruption and immoral scoundrels are commonplace". A diplomatic cable of the United States Department of State said, "At the heart of the show's dark story is the frustration felt by the average Korean, and particularly Korean youth, who struggle to find employment, marriage, or upward mobility—proving that grim economic prospects are indeed at the center of Korean society's woes."

=== Other commentary ===
Several journalists observed that the first season of Squid Game effectively used foreshadowing in alluding to the deaths of the major characters and other elements of the season. For example, Ali (Player 199) is shown in the second episode to be tricked by his employer out of his wages, while his death comes after he is tricked into giving Sang-woo his marbles in the sixth episode. Similarly, the gangster Deok-su (Player 101) evades a set-up by his underlings in the second episode by diving off a bridge, while his death in the game comes from the seventh episode Stepping Stones game when pulled to his death from the glass bridge by Mi-nyeo. Sae-byeok has a scar on her neck and holds a knife to the neck of the man who swindled her out of her money; later her throat is slit by Sang-woo. Several additional scenes in early episodes also were said to have hinted towards Il-nam (Player 001) being special and not just a normal player of the game, including being the only old person among the players, having the "001" player identification, and keen awareness of all the games since they were of his design.

The season drew some criticism for its similarity to the 2014 Japanese film As the Gods Will. Like the manga upon which the film was based, Squid Game features dangerous versions of children's games such as Daruma-san ga koronda, the Japanese version of Red Light, Green Light. Responding to allegations of plagiarism, director Hwang Dong-hyuk stated that he had been working on the script since at least 2008 and that similarities between the two films, of which he had been made aware during the process of filming, were coincidental. He acknowledged that he had been inspired by Japanese comics and animation, including Battle Royale and Liar Game.

Some bilingual viewers have debated the quality of Netflix's translations, observing that the English closed captioning, which was based on the English dub, changed the meaning of some dialogue when compared to the original Korean. Bilingual performers for the English dub acknowledged that there were some translation issues, and noted that this type of work is challenging due to limitations on how captioning can be presented to viewers. Jinhyun Cho, a senior lecturer in translation at Macquarie University, stated that particularly in the Korean language, there are words that are "untranslatable" such as aegyo, as well as honorifics used in Korean culture. Because on-screen translations are limited to a small space, there is no room for translators to provide the necessary context for these words, and thus they are often left out or overly simplified, frequently so in the case of Squid Game. Cho gave the example of Sang-woo asking Ali to call him hyung, a Korean honorific term used to refer to one as an older brother or an older trusted friend, rather than the more formal sajang-nim (company president) that Ali had been using since they first met. However, due to the complexities of the meaning of hyung, the English translation simplified "Call me hyung" to just "call me Sang-woo", losing the implication of this request. The quality of the subtitles of Squid Game opened debate about Netflix, and other services looking to expand their libraries with international works, to give more effort to the subtitles and closed captioning quality in order to better capture meaning of the original language.

The season received some criticism for its portrayal of women. Haeil, a feminist organisation in Korea, said that the season was "neither a representation nor a criticism of the reality of anti-feminism in Korea" and that it demonstrated an "exclusively male gaze". The season was also found to highlight how migrant workers from other Asian countries (in the case of Ali's character being from Pakistan) are treated and at times exploited as second-class citizens within South Korea, though some found Ali's character to be too naïve to the realities of the situation and a caricature of such migrant workers within the country.

== Reception ==
=== Critical response ===
The season received critical acclaim. On the review aggregator website Rotten Tomatoes, 95% of 77 critics' reviews are positive, with an average rating of 8.3/10. The website's consensus reads: "The website's critics consensus reads: "Squid Game's unflinching brutality is not for the faint of heart, but sharp social commentary and a surprisingly tender core will keep viewers glued to the screen – even if it's while watching between their fingers." Metacritic, which uses a weighted average, assigned the season a score of 69 out of 100, based on 13 critics, indicating "generally favorable" reviews.

Joel Keller of Decider opined that the concept of the season was creative. When writing about the narrative, he described it as "a tight narrative and a story that has the potential to be tense and exciting". Keller concluded, "STREAM IT. Squid Game takes a fresh idea and spins it into a thrilling drama; we hope it continues to build the tension we saw in the last 20 minutes throughout the season." Pierce Conran of the South China Morning Post rated the season with 4.5 out of 5 stars and wrote, "Overall, this is still a savagely entertaining slam dunk from Netflix Korea, which is likely to be embraced around the world as its predecessors were." Hidzir Junaini of NME rated the season with 4 out of 5 stars and opined, "Thematic intelligence aside, Squid Game is also a white-knuckle watch, thanks to its visceral competition element." John Doyle of The Globe and Mail described the season as "a brave, dark, ambitious tale, at times moving and at times terrifying" and added, "Its power is in its understanding that money is survival. This is not some dystopian fantasy like Hunger Games. This is present-day life in all its complex awfulness."

Karl Quinn of The Age described the season as "enormously derivative", but wrote: "there are two tensions that elevate Squid Game. One is within the narrative, where the primacy of the individual is in direct combat with the notion of community, and where the illusion of "choice" justifies all manner of exploitation." S. Poorvaja of The Hindu wrote that "the nine episodes manage to leave its viewers horrified, yet invested in The season, thanks to the razor-sharp writing and compelling performances by its ensemble cast". Abha Shah of the Evening Standard wrote that the season was "tightly written, each episode packed with enough pace to make it truly binge worthy", and praised its themes as being "universally engaging". Hugo Rifkind of The Times described parts of the season as being "glacially slow", but stated that it was "definitely interesting", and wrote: "Behind it all, there's an almost Lovecraftian sense of horror, to do with normal lives being unliveable, and huge, unknowable powers in the background that will smirk while you die."

Writing for The New York Times, TV critic Mike Hale found Squid Game to be an "utterly traditional, and thoroughly predictable ... melodrama" with "eye-catching" but "not especially interesting ... production design and costuming". He also thought the season' "pretense of contemporary social relevance" failed to justify its "more than mildly sickening" violence, and thought its characters were "shallow assemblages of family and typical battlefield". Daniel D'Addario of Variety wrote: "Like Joker, there's a having-it-both-ways insistence that a culture that could create violence is inherently sick and deranged, while playing out a wildly overstated version of sick derangement in a manner designed to be maximally tense and amusing."

Gi-hun has been received generally well in the first season of Squid Game. Teen Vogue writer Jae-ha Kim discussed how the 1997 Asian financial crisis influenced Gi-hun's story progression, particularly the loss of his job and the lack of education denying him opportunities, which she believed led him to taking predatory loans to survive. Salon writer Melanie McFarland felt that Gi-hun's actions, including draining his mother's bank account for gambling, represented how he, like other characters, fit into roles of either "monetary carnivore or scavenger." She also stated that Gi-hun's story is a sad one, arguing that he followed the "bootstrapping myth to the letter by working hard and playing by the rules" without anything to show for it. Authors Yavuz Akyıldız and Elif Şeşen argued that Gi-hun's decision to not use the money and "leads a miserable, depressive, and chaotic life" was a representation of the idea that the game cannot have a winner, stating that the economic structure of society leaves people "lonely and abandoned."

Screen Rant writer Andrei Sipos felt disappointed by the ending of the first season, believing that Sae-byeok should have survived instead of Gi-hun, feeling that him sacrificing himself for her would have made it more powerful. He felt that his "actions of atonement" came too late, and that the fact that he abandoned his daughter to go back to the games showed that he was "still the same flawed individual deep down inside." He felt that, had he sacrificed himself would have resolved a story about a character who starts out a bad person and progressively shows his goodness. He also felt that it would have been more compelling for Sae-byeok to win, since the character Ji-yeong died so that Sae-byeok could survive and take care of her family. Polygon writer Jenna Stoeber agreed that Sae-byeok should have won, believing early on that she would be the one to survive, either through winning or escaping. She believed that battle royale stories typically would see characters like Sae-byeok, who have "skills and defiance." She argued that Gi-hun, meanwhile, played by the rules and complied with the boundaries of the games, noting the scene where Il-nam and he watched to see if a drunken man in the streets would be rescued or not. She stated that he has the ability to save him but chooses not to, questioning whether he would learn to understand that he does not have to follow rules that are stacked against him.

Lee was nominated for multiple awards for his performance of Gi-hun, including a Golden Globe, Emmy, and Screen Actors Guild Award, the latter two he won. HoYeon Jung was called Squid Game's breakout star by critics. For her performance, she won the Screen Actors Guild Award for Outstanding Performance by a Female Actor in a Drama Series at the 28th Screen Actors Guild Awards. This nomination made her the second actress of Asian as well as Korean descent to receive an individual SAG Award nomination. Her win, along with Lee winning the respective male award, made history for the show becoming the first non-English language television series to win at the SAG Awards. She was also nominated along with her costars for the Screen Actors Guild Award for Outstanding Performance by an Ensemble in a Drama Series.

=== Viewership ===
The season became the first Korean drama to top Netflix's top ten weekly most-watched TV show charts globally. It reached number one in 94 countries, including the United States and the United Kingdom. Netflix estimated that Squid Game had drawn over 111 million member households worldwide after 17 days of availability, (Note: One "viewer" is defined by Netflix as a subscriber having viewed any portion of a work longer than two minutes.) and over 142 million member households after 28 days, surpassing the 82 million that Bridgerton had received in its first 28 days in December 2020, and becoming the service's most-watched series at its launch. After Netflix revamped its published metrics of viewership in November 2021 based on total hours watched of the season, Squid Game remained the most-watched show on the service, with over 1.65 billion hours within its first 28 days compared to Bridgerton's 625 million hours. Although Netflix is not available in mainland China, pirated versions of Squid Game have been widely circulated on the Chinese Internet, making the season a popular topic on Chinese social networking sites. As of July 2022, Squid Game remained the most-watched show on Netflix based on the first 28 days of viewing, ahead of Stranger Things 4.

Outside of Asian regions, the season's popularity was driven primarily through word of mouth and viral spread on social media. Vulture also claimed that the season's widespread localization, with subtitles in 37 languages and dubbed versions in 34 languages, helped to capture an international audience. Hwang believed that the season's popularity was due to "the irony that hopeless grownups risk their lives to win a kids' game", as well as the familiarity and simplicity of the games that allowed the season to focus on characterization. The diversity of the characters that play the Squid Game, drawing from different walks of lower- and middle-class life, also helps draw audiences to watch as many could find sympathy in one or more of the characters.

Squid Game had not broken into the Nielsen ratings for streaming media on its first week of availability, but for the week of September 20 through 26, 2021, it was the most-viewed show on streaming services in the United States, with over 1.9 billion minutes watched. It remained the top-viewed program on streaming media from September 27 to October 3, 2021, reaching over 3.26 billion minutes watched in the U.S. These ratings made it the most-viewed streaming program to date in 2021, and the sixth such program to reach over 3 billion minutes watched in a single week since the introduction of Nielsen's streaming media ratings. (Note: The other five programs that had reached 3 billion minutes viewed in a week are You, Tiger King, Ozark, The Umbrella Academy and The Crown, all Netflix series.) This is the only record achieved in a single season without COVID-19 lockdowns. Squid Game remained the most-watched show according to Nielsen for the weeks starting October 4 and 11, 2021, but was ousted by You in the following week. For four consecutive weeks, Squid Game remained as the most watched series on TV tracking service TV Time, where it also became the most followed Korean series to date. On YouTube, Squid Game related content generated 17 billion views within eight weeks, the highest for a television show, surpassing the viewership generated by Game of Thrones related content in ten years. Nielsen reported that Squid Game was the second-most watched original series in the United States on streaming services for all of 2021 behind Lucifer.

According to Bloomberg News, by October 2021, Netflix estimated that Squid Game had generated nearly US$900 million in value based on extended viewer data; it cost $21.4 million to produce. Due to Squid Game's surprising success for Netflix, operators of other streaming services with original content, such as Disney+, Paramount+ and Apple TV+, have begun looking to follow Netflix's model of discovering regional content beyond Hollywood and finding similarly successful works for their platforms, with one executive calling this an area of "unlimited potential". Besides bringing new ideas and veering from common themes of typical Hollywood productions, such foreign productions are typically less expensive to make, with tax breaks or incentives by the host country for filming and production. Several producers of non-US TV series, who had little luck in pitching their shows to US-based streaming services in the past, were hopeful that these services would now seriously consider their works as a result of Squid Game's success.

=== Accolades ===
O Yeong-su's Golden Globe win made him the first Korean-born actor to win the award. The season's four SAG Award nominations also made history in it becoming the first non-English series and first Korean series to be nominated for Outstanding Performance by an Ensemble in a Drama Series. Individually, Lee Jung-jae became the first male actor from Asia and Korea to receive an individual SAG Award nomination and HoYeon Jung became the second actress of Asian as well as Korean descent to do the same. With both performers winning, The season made history in becoming the first non-English language television series to win at the SAG Awards. The season also received 14 nominations for the Primetime Emmy Awards, including for Best Drama, making it the first non-English show to be nominated in this category.

=== Public response and impact ===
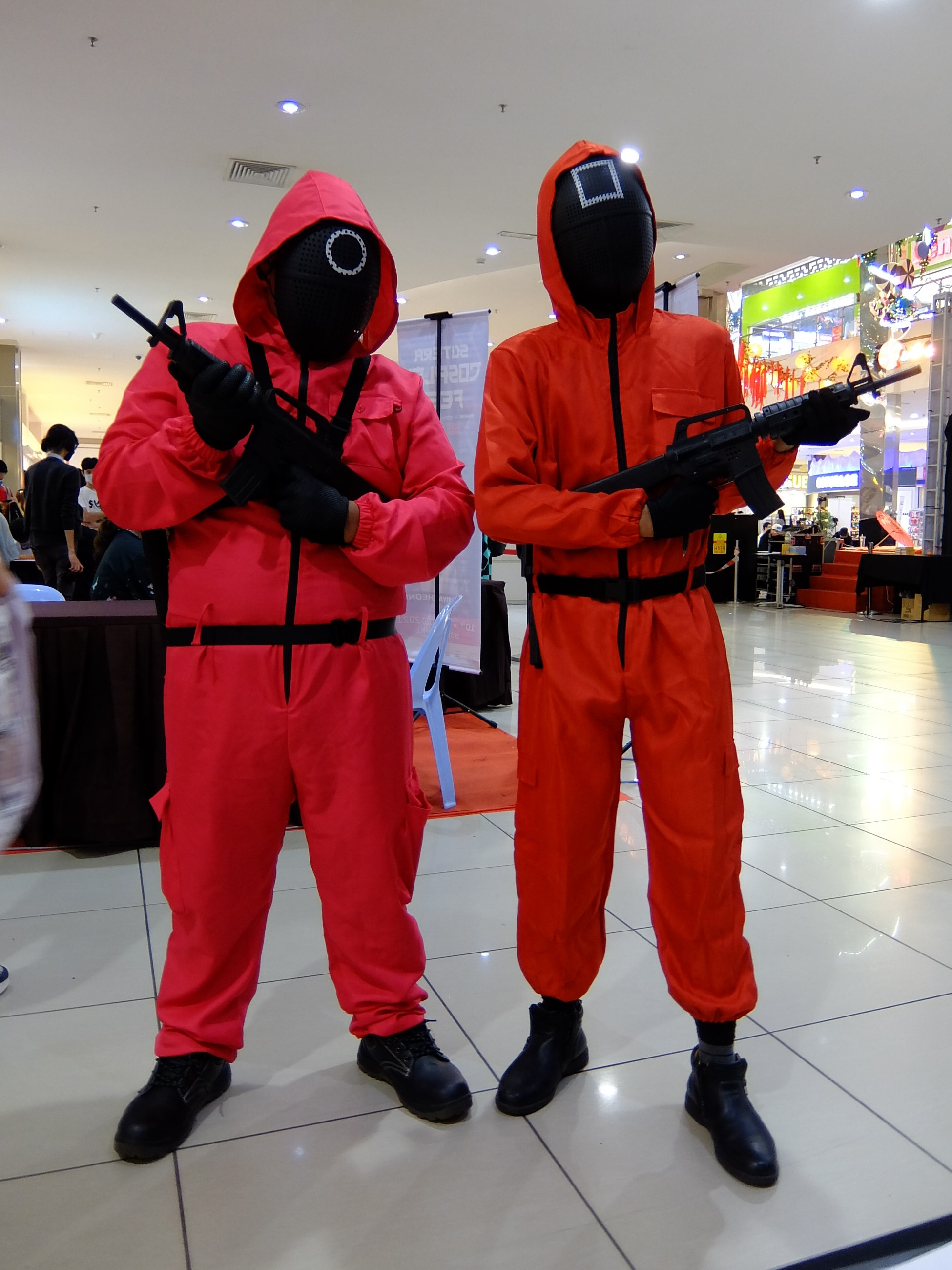
People cosplaying as guards from the season

Squid Game is considered one of the latest examples of the Korean wave, the growing trend of popular South Korean media to gain international attention since the early 2010s, similar to popular Korean pop acts like BTS and Korean dramas and films like Parasite. Such works had drawn more attention due to streaming services like Netflix and YouTube making South Korean content, traditionally controlled by the country's national broadcasters, available across the globe. Further, according to Choe Sang-Hun of The New York Times, South Korean creators have a way of taking ideas from foreign works and applying their own cultural spin on it that draws in more audiences.

While all of the actors saw increases in followers on their social media accounts in the weeks after the first season of Squid Game premiered, HoYeon Jung saw one of the largest increases, going from about 400,000 to over 13 million followers in three weeks after Squid Game premiered, and reaching over 23.5 million by November 2021. In October 2021, the fashion brand Louis Vuitton announced Jung as their new global ambassador for fashion, watches, and jewelry; creative director Nicolas Ghesquière said he "immediately fell in love with Jung's great talent and fantastic personality" from her performance on Squid Game. O Yeong-su, who had a modest career in Korean theater and film prior to Squid Game, was surprised by his newfound fame following the season, making him feel like he was "floating on air". Lacking a casting agent, he had to turn to help from his daughter to handle the volume of calls asking him to appear in various roles. Several major talent agencies sought to sign Hwang and the lead actors of Squid Game in the months after its debut, with Jung being the first to sign on with Creative Artists Agency by mid-November 2021.

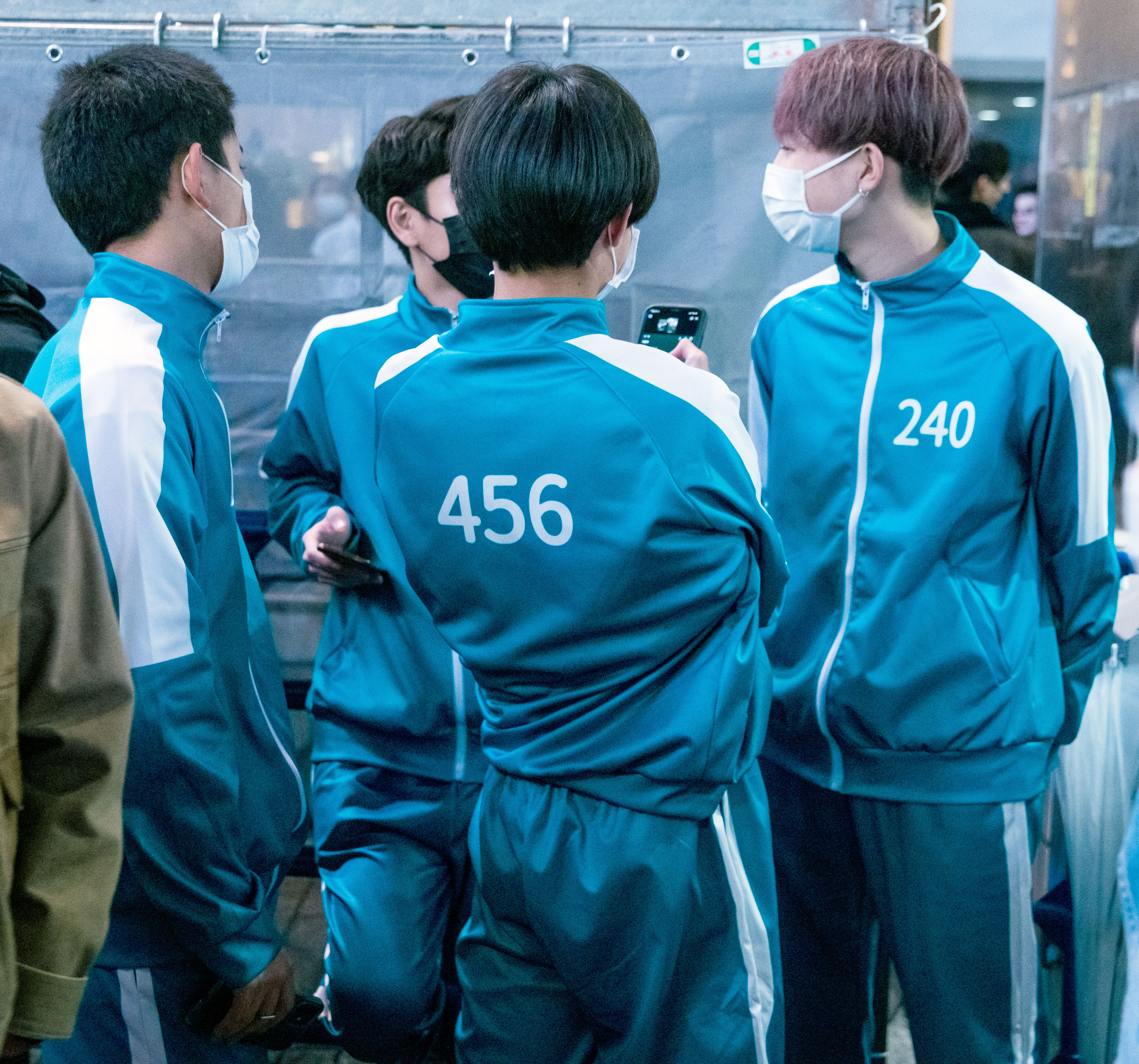
Cosplay of Squid Game players for Halloween in Tokyo, 2021

In South Korea, the popularity of Squid Game led to a surge of network traffic which caused SK Broadband to file a lawsuit against Netflix, seeking monetary damages to pay for increased broadband usage and maintenance costs associated with the program. By September 2023, both SK Broadband and Netflix agreed to drop the lawsuit and instead opted to become partners, with SK Broadband packaging Netflix as part of its services. One of the phone numbers used in the season belonged to a private resident who reported receiving up to 4,000 calls each day from people, several of whom desired to play a real-life version of the game; Netflix stated they would edit the season to remove the number.

Vendors of dalgona, the honeycomb candy featured in the second game, both within Korea and internationally found a significant increase in sales after the season's release. Everyday clothing items matching those worn in the season saw large growths in sales in the weeks after the season's initial broadcast, such as Vans slip-on shoes which spiked by 7,800%. Variety attributed this sales increase in part to preparation for Halloween costumes inspired by the season. Vendors of other costume props that mirrored those in the season, such as the guards' masks, also saw sales spikes in advance of Halloween following the season's premiere. The garment industry in South Korea saw a brief resurgence as demand for green tracksuits based on the season grew.

Netflix claimed that Squid Game had "pierced the cultural zeitgeist" and became a popular Internet meme, with over 42 billion views of videos related to Squid Game in the first month after broadcast. Analytics firm Vobile stated that by November 2021, Squid Game-related videos on YouTube totaled over 17 billion views, surpassing Game of Thrones in the same metric. On October 16, 2021, an episode of the American late-night live television sketch comedy and variety show Saturday Night Live, featuring guest host Rami Malek and cast member Pete Davidson, parodied Squid Game by singing a country song about the season. As of November 5, 2021, the song has over 9.6 million views on Saturday Night Live's YouTube channel. In November 2021, American YouTuber MrBeast recreated Squid Game in real life with 456 people competing in similar but non-lethal games as the season for a $456,000 cash prize. The video drew more than 303.5 million views as of November 15, 2022, making it one of the most-watched YouTube videos of 2021. Series creator Hwang has reacted positively to the recreations and parodies. Google reported that Squid Game was the most-searched television show on search engine in 2021, while Twitter said that Squid Game was the most-tweeted about television show of 2021.

Shortly after the season's release, users of social media adapted some of the games featured in Squid Game as Internet challenges, including the first "Red Light, Green Light" game and the second honeycomb cookie game. Users of video games supporting user-created content, such as Roblox, Fortnite Creative, and Grand Theft Auto Online, created numerous games within these systems that were based on one or more of the Squid Game challenges. A video game named Crab Game was also created in response to Squid Game's popularity. Some groups also worked to organize safe, mock Squid Game events for fans of the season. Concerns have been raised about children's exposure to Squid Game from either watching it or through its viral popularity, as it is considered to have a high level of violence for that age group. A number of schools around the United Kingdom observed that despite the season being aimed at mature audiences, young children were emulating some of the games from Squid Game during school recess, and warned parents about these activities. Parents and school boards in Quebec, Canada and in the Fayetteville-Manlius Central School District of New York have also observed young children emulating games from Squid Game and taken steps such as warning parents and banning such activities from school grounds.

Chinese online video platform Youku announced plans in October 2021 to launch the season Squid Victory (鱿鱼的胜利, Yóuyú de Shènglì) in 2022. The upcoming show, initially named Victory of Squid, was heavily criticized by Chinese netizens after it was discovered that it had plagiarized the plot and themes of Squid Game. After facing criticism, the company apologized and stated that the season's poster and the title were abandoned. Youku later shared a new poster and announced that the season's name has been changed to Game's Victory.

The season was used as the basis for an unaffiliated short-lived cryptocurrency scam named SQUID, which had started trading in late October 2021. The currency was poised to be used eventually to back a site for online games where player would buy tokens to play in games inspired by Squid Game, with those buying the currency helping to support the investment of the site, with the currency's value to increase as more players used the site. The currency had drawn enough buyers to increase in value by over 2,300% within a day of trading, but news organizations like the BBC identified that the scheme appears to be a "rug pull" scam due to several red flags in the proposition. By November 1, 2021, the backers of the currency completely pulled out, crashing the currency and effectively making off with $2.1 million.

YouTuber and member of the Yogscast network Lydia Ellery, who had used the handles "Squid Game" and "SquidGaming" for 11 years prior to the show, was refused work because of her handle's perceived association with the season. She was also subject to harassment by fans of Squid Game who "thought [she] took the account from the show", with some fans attempting to hack into her accounts.
