= VIPs (Squid Game) =

Squid Game characters

- Squid Game characters
- The VIPs from the first season
- First appearance: "VIPS" (2021)
- Last appearance: "Humans Are..." (2025)
- Created by: Hwang Dong-hyuk
- Portrayed by: See below

In-universe information
- Occupation: Game organizers
- Allies: Oh Il-nam; Hwang In-ho; Masked Officer
- Enemies: Hwang Jun-ho; Seong Gi-hun; Cho Sang-woo; Kang Sae-byeok; Kim Jun-hee's baby; Lee Myung-gi; Nam-gyu; Player 296

The VIPs are major antagonists of the South Korean Netflix drama Squid Game, and have first appeared in the seventh episode of the series, titled after them. They are an anonymous masked group of high-net-worth individuals who fund life-or-death games with a prize pool of ₩45.6 billion.

Initially a group of bored people unsure of what to do with so much money, Oh Il-nam suggests a way for them to have fun and invest money on these games. The VIPs bet on the players who will win and attend the final rounds to watch the games in person.

Reception towards the VIPs has been mixed. While some praised the characters as a metaphor for greed and excess, many viewers criticized the wooden dialogue and performances of their English-speaking actors, in contrast to the Korean cast.

== List of VIPs ==
=== Season 1 (2021) ===
- John D. Michaels as VIP 1
- Daniel C. Kennedy as VIP 2
- David S. Lee as VIP 3
- Geoffrey Giuliano as VIP 4
- Stephane Mot as VIP 5
- Michael Davis as VIP 6

=== Season 3 (2025) ===
- David Sayers as VIP Richard
- Jane Wong as VIP Jennifer
- Bryan Bucco as VIP John
- Jordan Lambertoni as VIP Jack
- Kevin Yorn as VIP Kevin

== Biography ==
=== Background ===
The VIPs are a group of people from different countries around the world who finance, watch, and bet on players, all for fun. During most of the Games, the VIPs communicate with the Front Man through phone calls. Like the hierarchy of Game workers, who wear masks with distinctive markings according to their position, the VIPs wear golden masks shaped like animals.

In the show, the VIPs wear masks as a symbol of their wealth, power, and a way to maintain a sense of anonymity. These masks, featuring various animal motifs like Lion, Bull, and Deer, represent their affluence and influence within the games. The masks also serve to further isolate them from the other participants and workers in the games.

=== Squid Game season 1 ===
With two games remaining on the Korean edition, a group of six VIPs arrive on the island to watch the final games in person and meet the Front Man. On the day of the fifth game, they are introduced to the game: a bridge consisting of two sets of glass tiles where stepping on the wrong one breaks, leading players to fall to their deaths. During the game, the VIPs enjoy comfort and frequently make humorous comments about the players' plight. Hwang Jun-ho, a police officer on the island looking for his brother, attracts the attention of one of the VIPs, who invites him to stay with him, makes a pass at Jun-ho, and takes him to his room. The VIP tries to get Jun-ho to perform oral sex on him, but Jun-ho overpowers and threatens him at gunpoint, and orders the VIP to tell him everything about the games, which he records on video. Eventually, the guards find the unconscious VIP and assist him. The VIPs watch the final game, the eponymous Squid game. When Seong Gi-hun / Player 456 demands the option to leave the game with Cho Sang-woo / Player 218, the VIPs are stunned by his willingness to reject the prize to save the only other remaining player, but Sang-woo refuses and commits suicide, making Gi-hun the winner by default. After the games end, the VIPs abandon their masks and leave the premises.

A year later, a disillusioned Gi-hun is shocked to receive a card from Oh Il-nam / Player 001, an elderly man with a brain tumor whom he thought perished in the Games. On his deathbed, Il-nam reveals himself to be one of the VIPs, explaining to Gi-hun that he and other wealthy people felt bored and lost with so much money and no idea how to spend it. One day, Il-nam and other wealthy people came up with an idea, which became the Games. Il-nam succumbs to his brain tumor soon after his explanation. Gi-hun vows to spend all of his prize money on finding all the members of the organization and bringing down the Games for good.

=== Squid Game season 3 ===
A group of four VIPs, three men and one woman, appear in the third season. Three of them take a turn playing guards during Hide and Seek. They then watch the Jump Rope game and witnessing Nam-gyu's death and Gi-hun crossing the bridge with 222's baby and fighting a player. It is the VIPs who suggest that player 222's baby should take Jun-hee's place in the games as the baby is Jun-hee's child. Then they watch Sky Squid Game with Gi-hun and Lee Myung-gi fighting which Gi-hun survives. They are shocked to see Gi-hun sacrificing himself by falling off in order to save Jun-hee's baby.

== Concept and creation ==
The VIPs were created by Hwang Dong-hyuk and played by numerous actors, most of them American. The VIPs wear face covering gold masks in the shape of animals. In addition to maintaining their anonymity, these masks also represent their power, wealth and the animal-like nature of the life-or-death games. All animal masks represent a distinctive meaning for each VIP.

== Reception ==
Kayti Burt for Den of Geek criticized the "bad English that VIPs had" in the series but understood it because "it is not native to that country [South Korea]."
