= Pakistanis in South Korea =

South Korea has one of the largest Pakistani diaspora community in Asia, numbering 7,000 according to 2004/05 Pakistani government figures, or 10,423 according to 2013 South Korean government figures. South Korea also remains a popular education destination for many Pakistanis. Apart from hundreds of self-funded Pakistani students studying in South Korean universities, Pakistan Higher Education Commission has also been sending hundreds of Pakistani students to study for MS and PhD degrees in South Korea. There were 1,420 Pakistanis who have married Korean women between 2001-2010 and settled permanently in South Korea. Pakistanis make a large representation of South Korea's Muslim community.

== Pakistani students in South Korea ==
The Pakistani students studying in South Korean universities are predominantly students of MS and PhD in the fields of science and engineering. Students are the most vibrant segment of Pakistani society in South Korea. They regularly come up with cultural events and activities. The surge of Pakistani students to South Korea started in 2007 with the induction of large number of HEC scholars in Korean Universities. Since then, Pakistani students have found different kinds of fundings in South Korea. In 2017, the number of Pakistani students in South Korea was estimated to be between 800 and 1500. The universities with largest number of Pakistani students are Sungkyunkwan University (nearly 170 students), Hanyang University (nearly 100 students), KAIST (nearly 70 students) and UST. Other major universities hosting Pakistani students are Sejong University, Kyunghee University, GIST, Seoul National University, Chungang University, Ajou University, Yonsei University, Kyungpook National University, , and Pusan National University. Pakistani students generally remain in touch through Facebook groups.

== Notable people ==
=== In fiction ===
- Anupam Tripathi, an Indian actor, a main cast member in the 2021 survival drama show Squid Game portrayed Ali Abdul, a Pakistani immigrant living in South Korea.
- Christian Lagahit, a Filipino actor, a minor cast member in Squid Game also portrayed a Pakistani in South Korea.

== See also ==
- Pakistan – South Korea relations
- Islam in Korea
