= Han Mi-nyeo =

Squid Game character

- Squid Game character
- Kim Joo-ryoung as Han Mi-nyeo
- First appearance: "Hell" (2021)
- Last appearance: "VIPs" (2021)
- Created by: Hwang Dong-hyuk
- Portrayed by: Kim Joo-ryoung
- Allies: Kang Sae-byeok; Cho Sang-woo; Ali Abdul; Seong Gi-hun; Oh Il-nam; Ji-yeong; Player 276; Player 196; Player 244; Byeong-gi
- Enemies: Jang Deok-su; Player 278; Player 303; Player 040; No Sang-hun; Jung Min-tae; Player 198

In-universe information
- Alias: Player 212
- Nationality: South Korean

Han Mi-nyeo (Korean: 한미녀; Korean pronunciation: [han.mi.njʌ]), also known as Player 212, is a character in the South Korean television show Squid Game. She is one of 456 players competing for 45.6 billion won in a life-or-death game, and attempts to ingratiate herself with and manipulate other players to survive, including having sex with a gangster called Jang Deok-su.

She was created by series creator Hwang Dong-hyuk, who was inspired to add the sex scene with Deok-su after watching a reality show depicting women on a desert island being attracted to male players who are strong and good at hunting. Mi-nyeo is portrayed by Kim Joo-ryoung, who Hwang personally picked for the role. Kim believed that Mi-nyeo's loud and talkative behavior was a product of her struggling to survive.

Mi-nyeo befriends her frenemies: Seong Gi-hun, Cho Sang-woo, Kang Sae-byeok, Ali Abdul, Ji-yeong and Oh Il-nam, whilst making enemies with her former allies: Jang Deok-su and his gang.

She has received generally positive reception, with multiple critics praising her depiction as a woman struggling to survive. There was criticism of how she was depicted in the English dub and subtitles, with multiple people arguing that the meaning of her words and characterization were changed from the Korean version.

== Appearances ==
Han Mi-nyeo appears in Squid Game as Player 212, having been offered to play games for money. Along with 455 other players, she learns that it is a life-or-death game, and after the first game, begs to leave, stating that she has a baby that she has not yet named. A vote it held, but Mi-nyeo votes to stay after learning the total prize of 45.6 billion won. The result narrowly favored leaving, but a large majority of players decide to return when given the opportunity, Mi-nyeo included, who ingratiates herself with fellow player Jang Deok-su, a gangster, by helping him pass the second game. They later have sex, during which Mi-nyeo asks for his protection and says she will kill him if he betrays her.

Before the next game, players are instructed to form a group of 10, which causes Deok-su to leave Mi-nyeo out due to her being a woman. She turns to protagonist Seong Gi-hun's group due to her being the last player and their only option. After surviving the next game, Mi-nyeo tries to ingratiate herself with Gi-hun's group, but is refused due to her attitude and treatment of another player. Before the fourth game, players are told to pair up; due to there being an odd number, she is left out, unable to participate and believed killed by other players. She is later revealed to be left alive and participates in the next game, which involves crossing a bridge of glass where players must guess which is tempered glass and which is regular. During this game, Mi-nyeo, seeking revenge, grabs Deok-su and forces both of them to fall to their deaths.

== Concept and creation ==
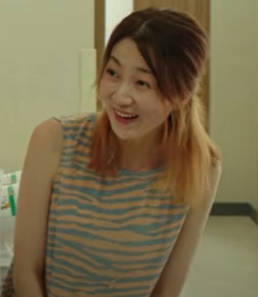
Kim Joo-ryoung portrayed Han Mi-nyeo

Han Mi-nyeo was created by Squid Game creator Hwang Dong-hyuk. The idea for the sex scene between Mi-nyeo and Deok-su came after Hwang watched a reality show about contestants on a desert island, stating that women on the show were attracted to people they wouldn't have been prior due to these people's strength and hunting ability. He felt that this depicted women as "sexual commodities," adding the scene to show that both men and women take "desperate actions in extreme situations." Describing this scene, Hwang said that it was a "different kind of love in a bizarre, strange, desperate situation," stating that Mi-nyeo believes that it's love because it makes it too sad for her otherwise.

She is portrayed by actress Kim Joo-ryoung, who Hwang approached on a set and told her that he was working on a show and would contact her when the project was finalized. She received the script through the assistant director and was offered the role. He was inspired to cast her after seeing working with her on the 2011 film Silenced. She described portraying the character as riding a roller coaster, calling her beautiful and mischievous while also pitiful in that she does not fit in anywhere. She characterized her as lonely and insecure, stating that her being loud and talkative was meant to convey that she is seeking attention and struggling to survive.

== Reception ==
Following the airing of the first season of Squid Game, actress Kim Joo-ryoung's Instagram follower count increased from 400 to 1.68 million. Men's Health writer Joshua St. Clair considered Mi-nyeo a "noble villain", someone who the viewers rooted for only at the end. He found it difficult to tell whether a decision was a calculated one or a desperate one, and called her death the most "spectacular", stating that while it was more "vindictive than selfless", it showed character development. While discussing translation issues with the show's English subtitles, Korean-American translator James Chung stated that the worst translations was the conversation between Mi-nyeo and Cho Sang-woo. According to Chung, in the subtitles, she is depicted as submissive and sexual, offering to "be your dream girl all night." Chung stated that, in Korean, she actually demonstrated her "ability to outperform expectations", that Mi-nyeo was intending to express that she should not be underestimated. He felt that the original demonstrated her cleverness, while the English translation "did not do her character justice." Chung also criticized the English subtitles for how it handled her calling people "Oppa", an "endearing and sometimes flirtatious term for an older male friend," was either ignored or mistranslated as "babe" or "old man". Podcaster Youngmi Mayer discussed a mistranslation, where Mi-nyeo is depicted as saying "I'm not a genius, but I still got it work out. Huh?" According to Vice writer Eileen Cho, the English dub has a more accurate translation: "I never bothered to study, but I'm unbelievably smart." Mayer felt that this misses the "huge trope" of the "poor person that's smart and clever and that just isn't wealthy," stating that it would be better as "I am very smart, I just never got a chance to study." Mayer said that this is a popular saying in Korea meant to convey street smarts as opposed to book smarts. TheGamer writer Stacey Henley discussed the treatment of women in Squid Game, believing that while Mi-nyeo was street smart, she is also portrayed as "naive, foolish, and pathetic", noting that some of the criticisms of her could be directed at the English translations. Despite this, she still found Mi-nyeo a "fascinating" female character.

Mi-nyeo has received generally positive reception from critics for her portrayal as a woman. The Hankyoreh writer Kim Kung-kwang considered Mi-nyeo the most memorable character in the show, expressing sympathy with her turning to a person like Deok-su for protection. She discussed her own experience of living alone in an unsafe neighborhood, and how when she moved in with her boyfriend, she became more comfortable, stating that living with her boyfriend helped make her feel safer. Kung-kwang felt that, while unfortunate that Mi-nyeo would trade sex for protection, their desires were the same—to know that they are safe and comfortable. In her book Surviving Squid Game, Suk-Young Kim praised Joo-ryoung, calling her a "mood maker" and complimenting her for feeling "weighty and visceral" and being a perfect member of an ensemble cast. While discussing the use of sharing names as a sign of trust, Suk-Young argued that Mi-nyeo stood contrary to this. She believed that Mi-nyeo was not her true name, but one she adopts, citing the name meaning "beauty" and appearing on her lighter as "Mi-nyeo's Lounge." L'officiel Singapore writer Rin Azhar stated that Mi-nyeo's story was one of a woman who "know[s] no better than to live through the codes of the patriarchy," stating that while she was often used as comic relief, they questioned whether it was appropriate to laugh at her or pity her. Azhar felt that Mi-nyeo used her body and sexual prowess to barter with other players, stating that this is a real-world phenomena called survival sex. They speculated that this could suggest that Mi-nyeo employed this tactic outside the games as well. Author Sarah Molisso believed that Mi-nyeo was the opposite of the "Wise Mother Good Wife" trope, which Melisso described as placing "women's reproductive value highly in the domestic sphere." She considered her a "vixen", stating that Mi-nyeo is the personification of "self-reliance and self-governance" and citing how she chooses Deok-su for protection and ultimately kills him when he betrays her. Inverse writer Lyvie Scott felt that Mi-nyeo "stole each scene" whenever she appeared, stating her belief that her death served the "central male narrative" above all.
