= Ji-yeong (Squid Game) =

Squid Game character

- Squid Game character
- Lee Yoo-mi as Ji-yeong
- First appearance: "Stick to the Team" (2021)
- Last appearance: "Gganbu" (2021)
- Created by: Hwang Dong-hyuk
- Portrayed by: Lee Yoo-mi
- Allies: Kang Sae-byeok; Ali Abdul; Seong Gi-hun; Cho Sang-woo; Han Mi-nyeo; Oh Il-nam; Player 196; Player 276
- Enemies: Jang Deok-su; Player 244; Player 278

In-universe information
- Alias: Player 240
- Nationality: South Korean

Ji-yeong (Korean: 지영; pronounced [tɕi.jʌŋ]), also known as Player 240, is a minor character in the Netflix series Squid Game. She is one of 456 participants in a series of life-or-death games based on South Korean children's games, with a cash prize of up to 45.6 billion won. She is invited to participate after leaving prison for the murder of her father who abused her and killed her mother, becoming an ally to fellow contestant Kang Sae-byeok / Player 067 during one of the games.

She was created by series creator Hwang Dong-hyuk, who initially envisioned her as a man before deciding during the writing process that the character would work better as a woman to improve solidarity with Sae-byeok. She was portrayed by Lee Yoo-mi, who worked closely with Sae-byeok's actress Jung Ho-yeon. Lee worked on Squid Game at the same time as the series All of Us Are Dead, requiring her to travel long distances and get into character along the way for both roles.

Ji-yeong received positive reception, particularly for her role in the episode "Gganbu". Her scenes in this episode were considered among the best in the series, with Lee winning the Primetime Emmy Award for Outstanding Guest Actress in a Drama Series for her performance, the first ever Korean actress to do so. Her relationship with Sae-byeok also received attention, considered a highlight of the series, and led fans to create shipping content of the two.

== Appearances ==
Ji-yeong first appeared in the first season of Squid Game as one of 456 participants in a secret series of life-or-death games, with a grand prize of up to 45.6 billion won. She makes it through the first two games; in the third game, while player Kang Sae-byeok is searching for someone to help construct a 10-person team, she recruits Ji-yeong. Their group survives this game, and Ji-yeong and Sae-byeok go on to be partners in the fourth game.

After partnering up, they are informed that the two partners must compete with each other to win their opponent's marbles, the loser being executed by gunfire. While other players attempt to compete with each other, Ji-yeong suggests they just spend the 30 minutes talking and bet it all at the end. Sae-byeok agrees, and they talk about their secrets, Ji-yeong rationalizing that since one of them is going to die, it doesn't matter what they say. They talk about their lives; Sae-byeok talks about her life in and escape from North Korea, trying to provide for her brother, and trying to get her mother to South Korea. Ji-yeong responds by talking about her childhood and her time in prison for killing her father, who physically and sexually abused her behind closed doors and eventually killed his wife – Ji-yeong's mother – leading Ji-yeong to murder him in retaliation. She received a card to join the games upon her release. Near the end, the two agree to compete to see who can get a marble closest to the wall. Sae-byeok tosses her marble, while Ji-yeong lets hers drop to the ground. Sae-byeok gets upset with her, demanding that she make a real attempt, but Ji-yeong believes that Sae-byeok has more to live for, while she has nothing if she survives. She smiles and thanks Sae-byeok for playing with her before she is executed.

== Concept and creation ==
Ji-yeong was created by series creator Hwang Dong-hyuk, who originally intended her to be a man. After he began writing, he decided that having her be a woman would create solidarity between her and Sae-byeok. Hwang felt that she and Sae-byeok were the most innocent characters, saying that while most of the cast was fighting to win, he wanted them to be the ones who weren't like that. He also aimed for them to have a kinship forged through empathy.

She was portrayed by Lee Yoo-mi. During production, Lee was also working on the show All of Us Are Dead as the character Na-yeon. These productions required her to travel back and forth across a large distance; during her travels, Lee used the opportunity to get prepared for the respective roles. For Ji-yeong, she tried to make herself feel empty, and did the opposite for Na-yeon. She and Sae-byeok actress Jung Ho-yeon did line readings together, with Jung frequently consulting Lee. When describing why she thought Ji-yeong was a popular character, Yoo-mi stated that she believed it was because "everyone wants and needs a person like that." She considered Ji-yeong a selfless person who puts others' needs and interests before her own.

== Reception ==
Lee's performance as Ji-yeong contributed to the actress' rise in popularity, causing her Instagram follower count to increase from 40,000 to 4.7 million by October 5, 2021. The actress won the award for "Outstanding Guest Actress" at the 2022 Creative Arts Emmy Awards, the first Korean actress to win it. The episode "Gganbu" was presented for consideration for this award. Seoul Economic Daily writer Do Hye-won felt that Ji-yeong was unique in how she approached the games; where other characters had a survival instinct, Do stated that Ji-yeong did not, and had no incentive to win. They state that Ji-yeong's purpose was to demonstrate what happens to a person who has no desire to participate in a society built around competition.

The relationship between Ji-yeong and Sae-byeok was considered a highlight of the series. TheGamer writer Stacey Henley felt that Ji-yeong, alongside Sae-byeok, were most of why the episode "Gganbu" was the "only essential" episode of TV she had seen from 2021. She felt that, as women, they contrasted the men, who compete while they talked. She described it as "gender roles taken to extremes," yet it didn't feel like it because it was so "tender and heartfelt." She found Ji-yeong's sacrifice for the sake of Sae-byeok's future "beautiful," and called her a "fascinating" female character. Den of Geek writer Kayti Burt also appreciated this scene between them, saying that them spending the 30 minutes talking and sharing secrets demonstrates their value in "humanity's capacity for togetherness and connection over humanity's capacity for violence and desperation." They felt that, despite assumptions that the title referred to the friendship between characters Gi-hun and Il-nam, they felt the title reflected that she and Sae-byeok became gganbu. Inverse writer Lyvie Scott felt that the connection between her and Sae-byeok was among the show's most emotional moments, praising both actresses for having been among the best performances in the show. Gold Derby writer Rob Licuria considered Ji-yeong's final moments to be among the most heartbreaking in the show, considering her story so tragic because her intentions were to be eliminated for the sake of saving Sae-byeok. Gayming Mag writer Aimee Hart found Ji-yeong's death and the "cruel" circumstances surrounding it "excruciating to watch," especially due to how much it impacted Sae-byeok. She found their relationship a deep one despite the short length of time they knew each other, calling it "intimate and heartbreaking."

Ewha Womans University research fellow Kim Eunyoung felt that Ji-yeong's story of domestic and sexual violence with her father may resonate more with people than an actual person's story, feeling that it helped highlight the vulnerability women face in society. She hoped that people seeing Ji-yeong's story would make people think about cases of child abuse, as well as what a victim may be pushed to in order to survive. She also discussed Ji-yeong abandoning her family name, believing that this, combined with her being met upon release from prison by a representative of the games, indicated that she had no one in her life and that her family only viewed her as her father's murderer. Writer Jeong Seong-hoon discussed how Ji-yeong defied the social abject of players competing to be number one, instead choosing to gift survival to someone else at the expense of her own, truly becoming Sae-byeok's friend in death according to Jeong. They stated that Ji-yeong did this out of gratitude, believing that she did so as thanks for Sae-byeok playing with her, that her being was an "existential gift" and that her will to live was "revived slightly" due to the bond she formed with her.

The relationship between Ji-yeong and Sae-byeok has been interpreted by some fans as queer-coded, leading to them being shipped together. Digital Spy writer David Opie felt that their discussion in the sixth episode showed an intimacy between them that helped spark this ship. The Daily Dot writer Gavia Baker-Whitelaw praised Ji-yeong and Sae-byeok's performances, believing that it helped communicate how driven they were both by their trauma. She felt that this was especially tragic due to her belief that they would have been friends in different circumstances, stating that she was unsurprised by how many people made content depicting them romantically.
