= Ali Abdul =

Squid Game character

- Squid Game character
- Anupam Tripathi as Ali Abdul / Player 199
- First appearance: "Red Light, Green Light" (2021)
- Last appearance: "VIPS" (2021)
- Created by: Hwang Dong-hyuk
- Portrayed by: Anupam Tripathi
- Allies: Cho Sang-woo; Seong Gi-hun; Han Mi-nyeo; Kang Sae-byeok; Oh Il-nam; Ji-yeong; Player 276; Player 196; Player 244
- Enemies: Jang Deok-su; Byeong-gi; Player 278; Player 303; Player 040; Factory boss

In-universe information
- Alias: Player 199
- Occupation: Factory worker
- Family: Unnamed son
- Significant other: Unnamed wife
- Nationality: Pakistani

Ali Abdul, also known as Player 199, is a character in the first season of the Netflix series Squid Game. Ali is a Pakistani immigrant who, in order to earn money for his family, immerses himself in the deadly game of ₩45.6 billion prize.

Created by Hwang Dong-hyuk and played by Anupam Tripathi, Ali is a character who shows the good that exists in human beings, even in situations of survival. He also reflects the problems faced by immigrants in Korea.

Ali befriends Seong Gi-hun, Cho Sang-woo , Han Mi-nyeo, Kang Sae-byeok, Oh Il-nam and Ji-yeong. He makes enemies with Jang Deok-su and his factory boss.

Tripathi achieved great fame after the role and received good reviews from critics. However, the casting of an Indian actor as a Pakistani character was criticized.

== Fictional biography ==
Ali Abdul is a Pakistani immigrant with a wife and an infant son. Ali participates in the game as Player 199, and in "Red Light, Green Light" he saves Seong Gi-hun from elimination and they pass at the last minute. When a vote is taken to continue the game, Ali presses the X and they finally leave the game. Outside, he begins to become close to Cho Sang-woo. Ali returns to work to demand payment, and when he sees his boss, who claimed to have nothing to give him, leaving with money which Ali suspects to be his, the two get into a fight, in which Ali injures his boss and runs away with the money, which he gives to his wife. Ali returns to the game and teams up with Gi-hun, Sang-woo, and Player 001 Oh Il-nam. In the second game, Dalgona, Ali chooses the circle as his figure and passes without difficulty. That night, Jang Deok-su kills a player and they realize they can increase the prize pool by killing players. That night, a fight breaks out, in which Ali and his team protect Player 067 from Deok-su. After the fight, the entire team calls each other by name. The third game is Tug-of-War, with Ali recruiting a fellow immigrant player to their team. With the help of Il-nam and Sang-woo, they manage to win. After the game, Ali is bullied by Han Mi-nyeo, a reject from Deok-su's team. To avoid another fight, the team stands guard, and Ali joins Sang-woo. They become closer and tell each other about their families. The fourth game must be played in pairs, and Ali is paired with Sang-woo. The game turns out to be about marbles, and one player must take all of their partner's marbles to win. Initially, Ali is winning, but Sang-woo is down to just one marble, causing Sang-woo to yell at Ali. In the end, Sang-woo tricks Ali and trades his marbles for stones, causing Sang-woo to be declared the winner and Ali to be executed.

== Concept and creation ==
Ali Abdul was created by Hwang Dong-hyuk and portrayed by Anupam Tripathi. The decision to cast Tripathi instead of a better-known actor was because he didn't want well-known actors for the role. Ali's character was made "innocent" and "loyal" in contrast to the harsh survival game he's subjected to. Tripathi had to bulk up for the role, gaining between 5 and 6 kilos for the role. Tripathi believed the season would have been incomplete without his character's presence and that his character's kindness was "a gift to other players." Dong-hyuk thought about what kind of people from marginalized groups could join the game, choosing a character like Ali to represent that. Tripathi looked for a way to play the character as best as possible, seeing himself with different people and keeping "gestures and expressions" for the character, even visiting the Korean embassy in India and observing every detail of their behavior. Tripathi also researched migrant workers and their labor issues to make his portrayal of Ali "the least cliché manner possible." Ali's character, although usually good and loyal, is capable of showing signs of strength and determination against other people when necessary. Tripathi tried to bring out the "human side" of a migrant with Ali, and how he looks out for the good of his family and friends and not his own. Tripathi felt that Ali was a very different character from the other migrant worker roles he has played because of his general character, wondering "how I was going to portray him."

Filipino actor Christian Lagahit originally auditioned for the role of Ali, but Tripathi ultimately went there. He eventually made it onto the season, playing Player 276, whom Ali befriends in the third game. The role of Ali was originally intended for Filipino actor Carlo Aquino, but he eventually had to drop out due to COVID-19 pandemic restrictions.

== Reception ==
Kayti Burt from Den of Geek mentions that Ali's characterization "didn't always work" but "works on an emotional and thematic level" and praised Ali's "goodness" as "not only an active decision, but one of the bravest ones." Taanya Rohira of GQ India praised Tripathi's strong performance among other cast members and how he gets us "attached" to Ali with his "compassion and empathy." Benazir Samad of NPR criticized Ali for having his family living with him when "it's not typical for struggling immigrant workers to bring their families with them" but liked the rest of Ali's character.

Anupam Tripathi achieved fame after his participation in the series, growing from 3,000 Instagram followers to nearly 4 million. His participation has also inspired other foreign actors from South Korea to land important roles.

Tripathi's choice to play Ali, a Pakistani, while being Indian, was criticized by the Pakistani community, opening a debate on the limited participation of Pakistani actors in television and film.

The character reflects not only the discrimination and disadvantages suffered by immigrants in South Korea but also in America. With Ali, it's about showing people's hatred of immigrants for fear of being better than them. This is shown by Ali being the only immigrant in the Games and by Sang-woo's betrayal when he turns out to be better at marbles than him. Ali also shows how immigrants treat their Korean employers with respect while being exploited by them. Ali also shows how immigrants are under the yoke of their employers, potentially being exploited and so on. Job insecurity is also shown when Ali complains about being injured on the job and not receiving care.

The language between the two reveals more of their connection, with Ali remaining loyal to him from the start, using terms like "sir" and even trusting him in the game of marbles. Ali and Sang-woo's closeness can be seen with Sang-woo refusing to be called "sir", establishing a relationship based on equality by refusing to be called such. Sang-woo's willingness to kill Ali for money is another symbol of capitalism. Ali's death shows the consequences of the nature of the fourth game and the change Sang-woo undergoes during the development of the games.
