= Kang Sae-byeok =

Squid Game character

- Squid Game character
- Jung Ho-yeon as Kang Sae-byeok
- First appearance: "Red Light, Green Light" (2021)
- Last appearance: "○△□" (2025)
- Created by: Hwang Dong-hyuk
- Portrayed by: Jung Ho-yeon
- Allies: Seong Gi-hun; Ji-yeong; Han Mi-nyeo; Ali Abdul; Oh Il-nam; Player 196; Player 276; Player 244; Park Man-cheol
- Enemies: Hwang In-ho; Cho Sang-woo; Jang Deok-su; Byeong-gi; Player 278; Player 303; Player 040

In-universe information
- Alias: Player 067
- Nationality: North Korea (defected)

Korean name
- Hangul: 강새벽
- RR: Gang Saebyeok
- MR: Kang Saebyŏk

Kang Sae-byeok (Korean: 강새벽; pronounced [kaŋ.sɛ.bjʌk̚]), also known as Player 067, is a fictional character from the Netflix dystopian survival thriller TV series Squid Game. A defector from North Korea to South Korea, she aspires to support her younger brother Cheol and help their mother enter South Korea through China, accepting an invitation to play life-or-death games for 45.6 billion won. She becomes acquainted with protagonist Seong Gi-hun after pickpocketing him, causing him to pursue her for it. They eventually become allies when push comes to shove to ensure their mutual survival.

Sae-byeok befriends Seong Gi-hun, Cho Sang-woo, Ji-yeong, Han Mi-nyeo, Ali Abdul and Oh Il-nam. She makes a rivalry with her former boss, Jang Deok-su.

She was created by series creator Hwang Dong-hyuk, who made her a defector in order to provide representation of a minority group in South Korea. Model Jung Ho-yeon was cast due to what Hwang described as having "the gaze of a wild horse". Jung researched for the role by watching documentaries about North Korean defectors, as well as writing a journal in character as Sae-byeok to get into the character better. She frequently consulted with actress Lee Yoo-mi, who portrayed Ji-yeong, which she felt improved the two characters' chemistry together.

Sae-byeok has been well-received, regarded as among the best characters in Squid Game season one. Jung received praise for her performance, and the depiction of her as a defector was considered significant, with politician and North Korean defector Ji Seong-ho stating that she reflected the truth of what it is like as a saying defector in South Korea. Despite being well received, her death was considered disappointing, with multiple critics believing she should have survived. Her character would be contrasted with season 2 and 3 protagonist Kim Jun-hee, who is also independent.

== Appearances ==
Kang Sae-byeok appears in the first season of Squid Game, attempting to seek an avenue for her mother to be brought from North Korea to South Korea through China while her brother remains in an orphanage. She is initially seen bumping into the protagonist Seong Gi-hun, pickpocketing him in the process. She ultimately accepts an invitation to join a game called Squid Game, where she meets Jang Deok-su, whom she worked with and who had a grudge with Sae-byeok, and Gi-hun, who learned of her pickpocketing and demands his money back. Sae-byeok survives the first game, Red Light Green Light; afterward, a vote is called to leave the game, and it is revealed that each person's death adds 100 million won to the prize pool, for a total of 45,600,000,000 won. Sae-byeok votes to stay in the game, but by a narrow majority, the result is to leave. She is left on a road tied up and blindfolded with Gi-hun, where she gets to untie herself, leaving Gi-hun still blindfolded and tied up. Gi-hun convinces her to untie his hands by swearing on his mother's life that he would forget the money she stole, only for him to break that vow, left with his legs tied. She visits her brother Cheol, who resents her for leaving him back at the orphanage. She promises to get him out of here and find their mother, going to a broker she had paid to locate their mother. The broker says that he will need more money to get her to China. He complains about the difficult process, prompting her to splash him with hot tea and threatening him with a knife, leaving after saying she will get him the money. She decides to return to the game when given the opportunity, as did the large majority of players from the previous games, covering her mouth so she doesn't get knocked out by the gas when picked up and managing to sneak her knife in.

Sae-byeok uses her knife to enter a vent in the bathroom at night with assistance from a woman named Han Mi-nyeo, allowing her to see that the workers were melting sugar, though she did not understand the significance of this. Later, she meets with Cho Sang-woo, who suspected she knew something, and shares what she knew after he suggested he could help. In the next game, they have to choose between four shapes: triangle, circle, star, and umbrella. Seeing Sang-woo choose triangle, she follows, and is then told she must break the shape chosen out of dalgona. She succeeds, moving on. During the interim, Deok-su discovers that killing people is allowed, and plans an attack during the night. Before lights out, Gi-hun invites her to join them, but she rejects the offer. Sae-byeok becomes targeted by Deok-su, but is saved by Gi-hun, accepting his offer. During the day, they form a group of 10, including Gi-hun, Sang-woo, Ali Abdul, an old man, Mi-nyeo, and a woman she brings to the group named Ji-yeong. They find out it's tug of war, and with the assistance of the old man's tug of war advice, they manage to survive. Sae-byeok declares her distrust of the group, helping create a barricade to protect them during the night. She helps keep watch, and the next day, they are told they must pair up with another player.

Sae-byeok and Ji-yeong pair up, later learning that the goal is to take your partner's marbles. Ji-yeong proposes they talk instead of competing right up until the time runs out. They discuss their family history and life situation, Ji-yeong divulging that her father killed her mom and that she killed him after. Sae-byeok states that she wants to go to Jeju Island. Near the time limit running up, they agree to throw marbles, with the marble closest to the wall winning. Sae-byeok makes her throw, and Ji-yeong drops hers, choosing to lose. Sae-byeok confronts her, demanding that she explain and throw properly, but Ji-yeong says she has no reason to survive and wants to ensure that Sae-byeok can get her mom and brother and take them to Jeju Island. Sae-byeok leaves the play field in tears, Ji-yeong expressing thanks for playing with her before she is executed. In the next game, the glass stepping stones game, she, Gi-hun, and Sang-woo were the players in the back, nearly everyone else falling through, including a man Sang-woo pushed. Once the three of them reach the end, the bridge explodes, and shards of glass pepper them, a large shard stabbing her in the stomach. She and the others are given food, a sharp knife left behind after cleanup. Gi-hun and Sae-byeok partner up and stay on the opposite side of the room from Sang-woo, talking about each other's families and each promising to take care of the other's family. She begins to pass out due to blood loss, and while Gi-hun rushes to the door to get help, Sang-woo slits her throat, killing her to prevent her and Gi-hun from voting to leave the games.

Gi-hun manages to win while Sang-woo dies in the last game, helping Cheol get out of the children's home by sending him to live with a family friend and giving a large sum of money to them. In the second season, Gi-hun has a nightmare involving Sae-byeok and Sang-woo, with the frontman holding their severed heads. Gi-hun is then shown to be attempting to pay the broker to continue to help Sae-byeok's mother escape from North Korea, though the broker rejects it, saying that he does not want the money and wants to find Sae-byeok's mother to make up for his actions.

In the third and final season, Sae-byeok is shown as a hallucination while Gi-Hun is about to murder the finalists in their sleep, restating that he is not a murderer.

== Concept and creation ==
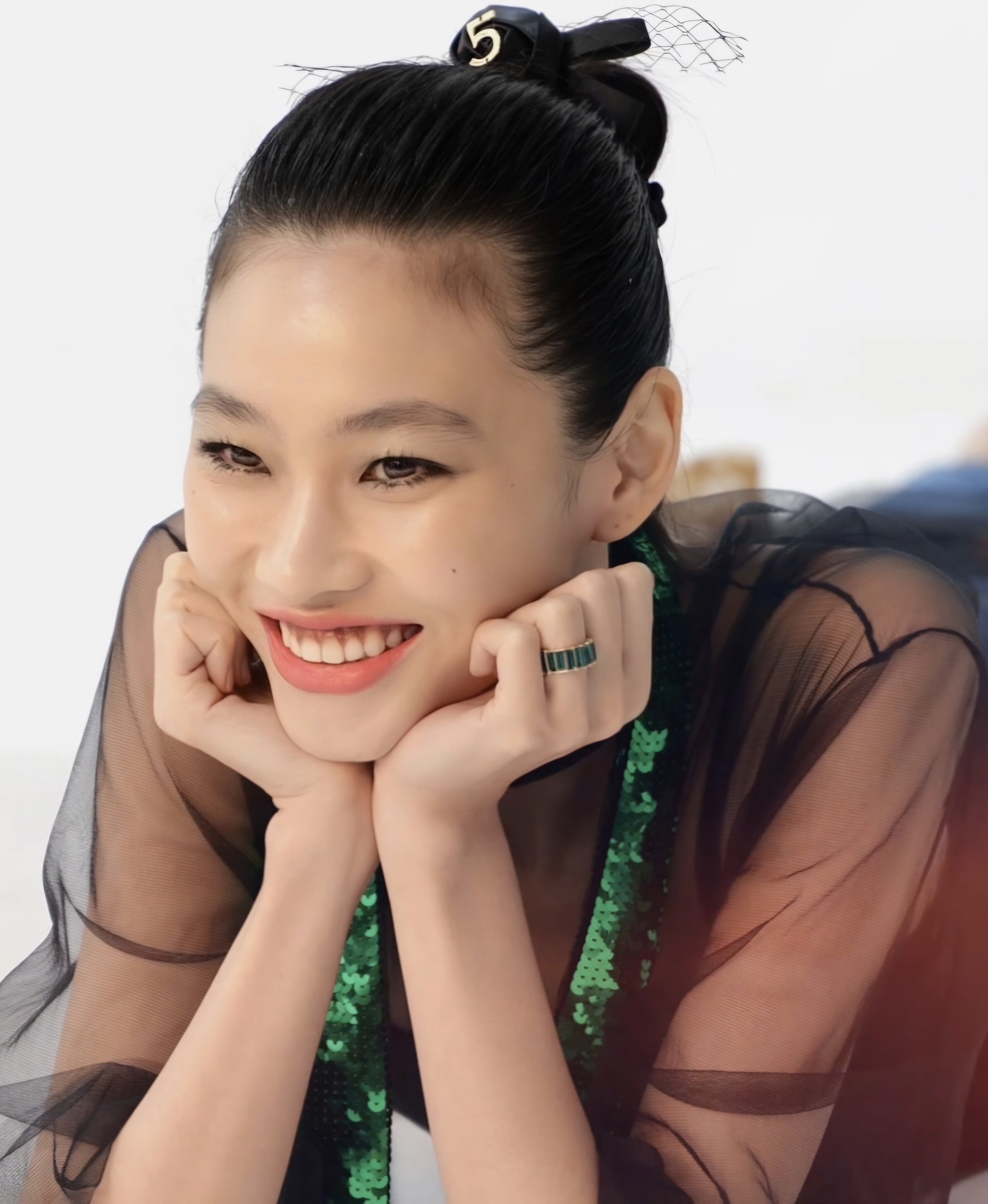
Kang Sae-byeok was portrayed by model Jung Ho-yeon, who became an actress through this character

Kang Sae-byeok was created by series creator Hwang Dong-hyuk. She was initially not a North Korean defector; this depiction was given after Hwang wrote the script, as he wanted to depict different types of minorities living in South Korea. She was given the name she had because she was a character who could find hope in darkness. She was portrayed by Jung Ho-yeon, a model who aspired to be an actor, taking acting classes and signing with an agency. Shortly after, she received an invitation to audition for Squid Game, with the role receiving auditions from many actresses. Hwang stated that her voice and appearance fit his image of Sae-byeok, and hoped that her "fresh charm" would come across. Jung stated that Hwang told her he thought her eyes resembled a wild horse's and that she felt like she had a strong will. He gave her the role after doing an in-person audition. Hwang also stated that he chose her because he wanted a less well-known performer for the role.. The rivalry and choreography with Deok-su foreshadows the rivalry between Thanos and Nam-gyu both against Lee Myung-gi.

Jung reviewed documentaries about North Korean defectors, practicing a North Korean accent with the assistance of a teacher. She wrote journals in character as Sae-byeok, writing a backstory for her that were not featured in the show. She also took martial arts classes to prepare for the role, training with Jang Deok-su actor Heo Sung-tae and other cast members. She also did line readings with Ji-yeong actress Lee Yoo-mi, her first reading partner and someone Jung frequently consulted. She felt that their conversations helped create better chemistry between their characters, that their final scene was able to depict the actress' bond. Jung found the scene of Sae-byeok removing glass was the most difficult one for her to film, stating that she struggled to not cry and that she became Sae-byeok in this scene. When describing what drew her to Sae-byeok, Jung said that it was Sae-byeok's ability to sacrifice for others, as opposed to Jung's more individualistic, stating that it made her value considering others more.

== Reception ==
Kang Sae-byeok received generally positive reception, described as a "fan favorite" by The Cut writer Brooke LaMantia, particularly among women. LaMantia considered her appearance attractive, citing details like her "wispy bangs, big eyes, and pouty lips" among other things as to why. Inverse writer Alex Welch felt that she was the best character of the first season. He felt that Jung had one of the best performances in movies and TV in 2021, stating that the effort she put into the role was well worth it. He felt that Jung's experience in modeling contributed to her performance, calling everything the character does "purposeful and real." Duluth News Tribune writer Melinda Lavine praised Jung's transition from model to actor, stating that she does a good job demonstrating her "fear and perseverance" as well as calling the performance a "revolution in storytelling and performance." Den of Geek writer Kayti Burt felt that Sae-byeok and Ji-yeong represented the "capacity for hope," arguing that the title "Gganbu" (meaning "a good friend") referred to Sae-byeok and Ji-yeong's relationship. Discussing the relationship between Sae-byeok and Ji-yeong, Gayming Mag writer Aimee Hart found it a particularly compelling aspect of the show. She appreciated that it gave Sae-byeok the opportunity to show vulnerability and development, believing that the two have respect for each other. Hart discussed how painful it was to see Sae-byeok struggle with Ji-yeong's death, made more painful by Sae-byeok's death later in the series. Following the success of Squid Game, actress Jung Ho-yeon's Instagram follower count increased from 400,000 to 13 million. She later attained 20 million followers. A trend occurred on YouTube, where videos featuring the actress released before Squid Game had the series name added to get more views.

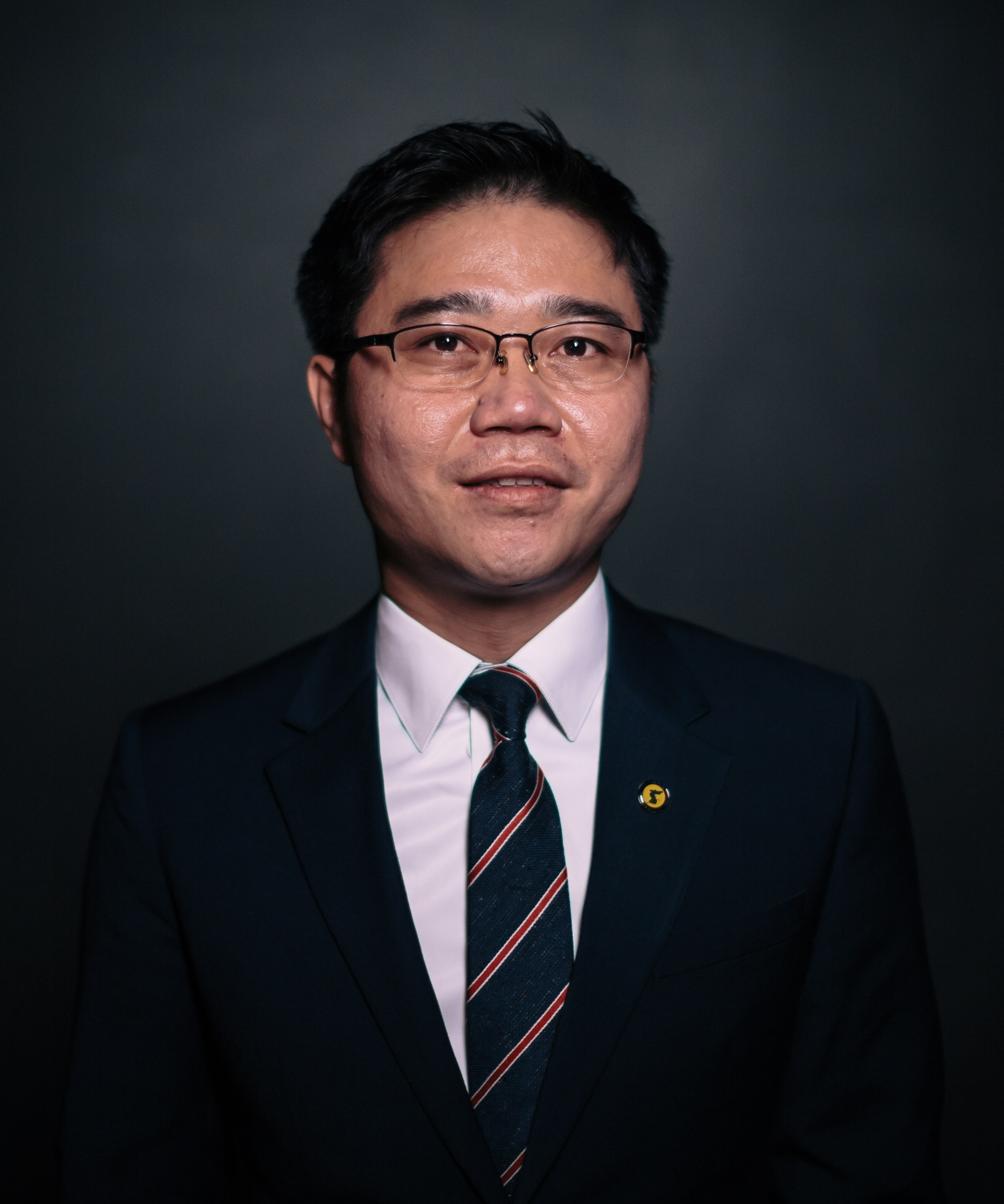
Politician and North Korean defector Ji Seong-ho felt Sae-byeok was a realistic portrayal of North Korean defectors

America writers Jim McDermott and Keara Hanlon discussed Sae-byeok, with McDermott stating that she is a significantly more interesting character than all the male characters. Hanlon expressed disappointment with the conclusion of her arc, commenting that she is "clever and courageous" and that she joined for a selfless reason. With that, she felt it unfair that she died during the glass game despite winning that game. Her death was described as hard-hitting by Digital Spy David Opie, who attributed it to her backstory and actress Jung Ho-yeon's skill. TheGamer writer Stacey Henley felt that Sae-byeok's treatment in the show reflected the show's treatment of women. While she praised Sae-byeok's interactions with Ji-yeong in the sixth episode of the first season as the best part of it, she disliked how unceremonious her ending was. Despite this, she considered Sae-byeok a "fascinating" female character. Polygon writer Jenna Stoeber believed that Sae-byeok should have won instead of Gi-hun, believing early on that she would be the one to survive, either through winning or escaping. She believed that battle royale stories typically would see characters like Sae-byeok, who have "skills and defiance." She argued that Gi-hun, meanwhile, played by the rules and complied with the boundaries of the games.

Her status as a North Korean defector was the subject of discussion by critics, her popularity attributed by Radio Free Asia writer Jamin Anderson to the story of her defecting from North Korea and struggling to survive. Greg Scarlatoiu, the CEO of the Committee for Human Rights in North Korea, believed that Sae-byeok could lead to criticisms of North Korea. He felt that the story of Sae-byeok and her family - scammed by a broker, father killed, and mother repatriated - was the story of a North Korean defector. Park Ji-hyun, CEO of a British human rights organization and North Korean defector, expressed worry that Sae-byeok could create animosity for defectors in South Korea due to her being a pickpocket. She also felt North Korea could use her character for propaganda purposes to show the dangers of capitalism and to show that North Koreans are treated badly in South Korea. South Korean politician and North Korean defector Ji Seong-ho made the argument that a majority of North Korean defectors are in vulnerable groups, stating that Sae-byeok's story is a realistic one.

Following the first season, there were questions and speculation as to whether Sae-byeok would return by fans, stoked by comments by creator Hwang Dong-hyuk that the actress may return in some capacity. There was speculation that the season 2 character Kang No-eul, also a North Korean defector, was related to Sae-byeok. In addition to her being a defector, having the same surname and similar meaning to their given names.
