= Kim Joo-ryoung =

South Korean actress (born 1976)

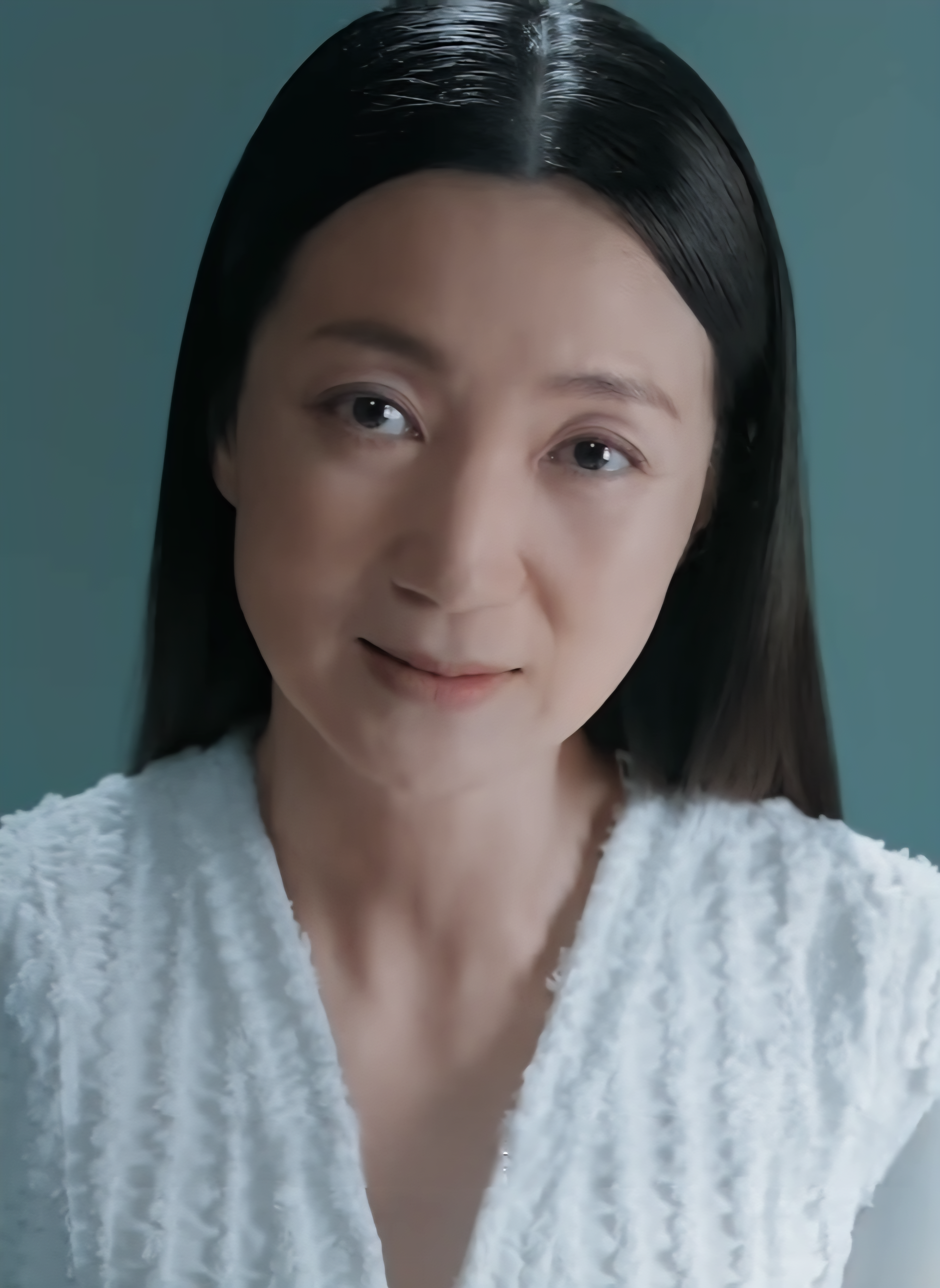
- Kim in 2024
- Born: September 10, 1976 (age 50); Gyeonggi, South Korea
- Occupation: Actress
- Years active: 2000–present
- Agent(s): Just Entertainment; A3 Artists Agency
- Children: 1

Korean name
- Hangul: 김주령
- RR: Gim Juryeong
- MR: Kim Churyŏng

Kim Joo-ryoung (Korean: 김주령; born September 10, 1976) is a South Korean actress. She is mainly known for portraying Han Mi-nyeo or Player No. 212 in the Netflix original series Squid Game. For her performance, she was nominated for Best Actress in an Action Series at the 2nd Critics' Choice Super Awards.

== Filmography ==
Key
†	Denotes films or TV productions that have not yet been released

=== Film ===
Year	Title	Role	Notes	Ref.
2000	Plum Blossom	Werther		
2001	Sorum	Yong Hyun's mother		
2003	Memories of Murder	Nurse		
2005	You Are My Sunshine	Broadcast journalist		
2005	Mr. Housewife	Writer Kim		
2006	One Shining Day			
2006	Four Horror Tales: Roommates	Teacher No.2		
2006	No Mercy for the Rude	Hunchback Woman		
2007	Paradise Murdered	Ghost		
2007	Texture of Skin	Jae Hee		
2008	My Dear Enemy	So Yeon's mother		
2009	Handphone	Eum Sung		
2009	I'm in Trouble	Soon Ae		
2011	Re-encounter	Hwa Young		
2011	Silenced	Yoon Ja-ae		
2013	Sleepless Night	Joo Hee		
2017	Bluebeard	Mi Sook		
2017	The Mayor	Spokesperson for Byun Jong-goo's campaign		
2018	Land of Happiness	Jin Sun		
2018	Feng Shui	Mother		
2019	Spring, Again	Reporter Kim		
2019	By Quantum Physics: A Nightlife Venture	Investor	Cameo	
2019	The Snob	Kim Bo-ryeong		
2020	Collectors	Real estate agent	Cameo	
2021	Recalled	Doctor	Cameo	
2023	Juhee from 5 to 7	Juhee		
2023	Taste of Horror – Rehabilitation		Short film	
2024	Spring Garden	Hye-ran		
2024	The Noisy Mansion	Ji-won		
2025	Hana Korea	Seok-hui		
2025	Sisterhood	Jung Yul-hee		

=== Television series ===
Year	Title	Role	Notes	Ref.
2017	Andante	Young Sook		
2018	Queen of Mystery 2	Won-jae's mother	Cameo	
2018	Mr. Sunshine	Imperial Consort Sunheon	Cameo	
2018	The Ghost Detective	Gil Chae-won's mother		
2018	Ms. Hammurabi	Youngest Daughter in a case	Cameo (Episode 7)	
2018	Sky Castle	Noh Seon-hye	Cameo	
2019	Babel	Kim Myung-shin	Cameo	
2019	Welcome to Waikiki 2	Han Soo-yeon's speech teacher	Cameo (Episode 9)	
2019	Voice	Kwon Se-young's mother	Cameo (Episode 1–2)	
2019	Doctor John	Park Hyun-sook	Cameo (Episode 15–23)	
2019	Drama Stage: "Woman with a Bleeding Ear"	Im Sung-hee	One-act drama	
2020	When My Love Blooms	Sung Hwa-jin		
2020	Kingmaker: The Change of Destiny	Joo Mo		
2020	The School Nurse Files	Doctor	Cameo (Episode 6)	
2021	Artificial City	Go Seon-mi		
2021	Squid Game	Han Mi-nyeo (Player No. 212)		
2022	Big Bet	Jin Young-hee		
2022	Poong, the Joseon Psychiatrist	Seo Eun-woo's mother-in-law	Cameo (Episode 1–3)	
2022	Revenge of Others	Jin So-jeong		
2023	Twinkling Watermelon	Lim Ji-mi		
2024	Queen of Tears	Grace Ko / Ko Jeong-ja		

== Accolades ==
=== Awards and nominations ===
Name of the award ceremony, year presented, category, nominee of the award, and the result of the nomination
Award ceremony	Year	Category	Nominee / Work	Result	Ref.
Asia Artist Awards	2021	Best Actor Award	Kim Joo-ryoung	Won	
Baeksang Arts Awards	2022	Best Supporting Actress – Television	Squid Game	Nominated	
Blue Dragon Series Awards	2022	Best Supporting Actress	Squid Game	Nominated	
Blue Dragon Series Awards	2023	Best Supporting Actress	Big Bet	Nominated	
Critics' Choice Super Awards	2022	Best Actress in an Action Series	Squid Game	Nominated	
Director's Cut Awards	2022	Best New Actress in series	Squid Game	Nominated	
Screen Actors Guild Awards	2022	Outstanding Performance by an Ensemble in a Drama Series	Squid Game cast (Note: Consisting of Lee Jung-jae, Park Hae-soo, Wi Ha-joon, HoYeon Jung, Anupam Tripathi, Heo Sung-tae, O Yeong-su, and Kim Joo-ryoung.)	Nominated	

=== Listicles ===
Name of publisher, year listed, name of listicle, and placement
Publisher	Year	Listicle	Placement	Ref.
Variety	2022	Women That Have Made an Impact in Global Entertainment	Placed	
