= Illegal immigration to South Korea =

Since 1991, Korea has experienced a large influx of foreign workers, and the government has utilized trainee programs since 1992. About 10,000 Asian workers came to Korea under this program in 1992, and there were about 57,000 trainees in Korea in June 1996. However, the trainee program experienced problems: the trainees became undocumented workers due to a difference in wages and since they were not classified as laborers, they were not protected by the Labor Standard Law. The Employment Permit Program for foreigners (the government’s foreign-labor policy since 2004) is a product achieved by a decade of interaction between Korean citizens and foreign migrant workers. However, these issues have more details to be resolved. On the legal front, the Korean state still allows foreigners to apply for low-wage jobs and excludes them from social benefits. The social dimension of nationhood is shown by public-opinion polls of Korean citizens' attitudes towards foreign workers, which demonstrate discrimination.

As of the end of June 2011, 166,518 foreigners had overstayed their working visas, a reduction from 177,955 in 2009 and 168,515 in 2010, according to the authorities.

The ministry stated 17 immigration offices under its control will conduct the one-month crackdown in conjunction the Ministry of Employment and Labor.

In 2011, the South Korean government temporarily refused to accept Vietnamese migrants.
