= Anupam Tripathi =

Indian actor (born 1988)

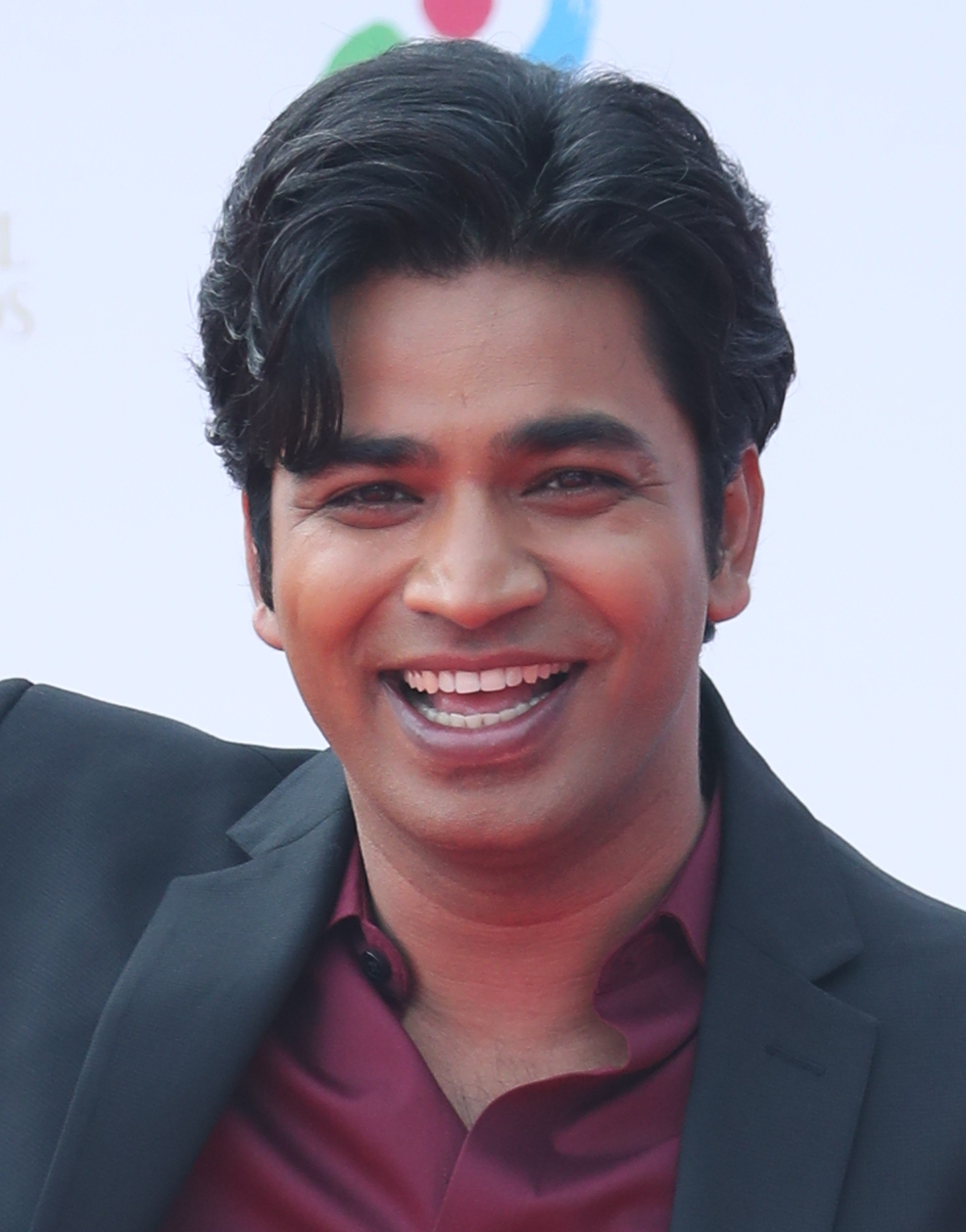
- Tripathi in 2022
- Born: 2 November 1988 (age 38); New Delhi, India
- Education: Korea National University of Arts
- Occupation: Actor

Anupam Tripathi (Korean: 아누팜 트리파티; born 2 November 1988) is an Indian actor based in South Korea. He has appeared in various South Korean television series and films. His first main role as Ali Abdul in Netflix's South Korean survival drama series Squid Game (2021) garnered him worldwide recognition.

== Early life ==
Tripathi was born in New Delhi on 2 November 1988. He became interested in acting after playing a slave in a stage production of Spartacus. He was a part of the playwright Shahid Anwar's Behroop theater group from 2006 to 2010.

Tripathi began training in singing and acting in 2006. He intended to attend the National School of Drama in New Delhi but moved to South Korea in 2010 to attend Korea National University of Arts on the Arts Major Asian scholarship. He has discussed the initial difficulty of adjusting to the cultural and language differences but then became fluent in Korean in less than two years.

== Career ==
Tripathi began acting in Korean plays and commercials during his third year of university. His first feature film credit was as an unnamed Sri Lankan man in Ode to My Father (2014). He had a minor role as a bomb expert fighting for Korean independence in the play 불량청년, which was selected for the 36th Seoul Theater Festival, and had various minor unnamed roles in television series like Hospital Playlist (2020), Rain or Shine (2017), and films such as Space Sweepers (2021) and Asura: The City of Madness (2015). Many of his roles relate to being a migrant worker in Korean society.

Tripathi's first main cast credit was as the undocumented Pakistani worker Ali Abdul on the Netflix original series Squid Game (2021). Director Hwang Dong-hyuk said that it was "hard to find good foreign actors in Korea" and that he cast Tripathi because of his emotional acting capabilities and fluency in Korean. Following the series' international success, Tripathi's follower count on Instagram increased from 10,000 to over 2.5 million in a matter of days.

== Personal life ==
Tripathi is fluent in English, Hindi, and Korean.

He received his master's degree in acting at Korea National University of Arts in 2024.

== Filmography ==
=== Film ===
Year	Title	Role	Notes	Ref.
2014	Ode to My Father	Sri Lankan Tamil man		
2015	The Phone	Charles		
2016	Asura: The City of Madness	Indian labourer		
2016	Luck Key	Indian man		
2017	Heart Blackened	Factory manager		
2017	The Heartbeat Operator	Nepalese chief		
2019	Miss and Mrs. Cops	Arab subordinate		
2021	Space Sweepers	Sullivan's assistant		
2021	The 8th Night	Preacher	Voice	
2022	Vanishing	Foreign broker	Special appearance	
2025	Rhapsody for the Dead	Anuat		

=== Television series ===
Year	Title	Role	Notes	Ref.
2015	Hogu's Love			
2015	Let's Eat 2	Indian restaurant waiter	Cameo (Episode 4)	
2016	Descendants of the Sun	Man that gives the shoe to Dr. Kang	Cameo (Episode 6–7)	
2016	The K2	wounded man	Cameo (Episode 2)	
2017	Just Between Lovers	Sook-hee's customer		
2020	Hospital Playlist	The relative of a foreign patient	Cameo (Episode 4, season 1)	
2021	Squid Game	Ali Abdul (Pakistani guest worker)	Main role (Episodes 1-6)	
2021	Mouse	Student	Cameo (Episode 1)	
2023	King the Land	Prince Samir	Supporting (Episode 7–8)	
2024	IC 814: The Kandahar Hijack	Ram	Main role (Episodes 1-6)	Hindi TV show
2025	Oh My Ghost Clients	Nimal	Supporting role (Episodes 1-2)	
