= Geoffrey Giuliano =

American writer and actor (born 1953)

- Born: September 11, 1953 (age 73); Rochester, New York, U.S.
- Education: Hillsborough Community College; SUNY Brockport
- Occupations: Actor; author
- Children: 2
- Website: geoffreygiuliano.com

Geoffrey Giuliano (born September 11, 1953) is an American actor and author.

== Early life ==
Giuliano was born on September 11, 1953, in Rochester, New York. He moved to Tampa, Florida, with his family when he was 12 years old, where he graduated from Plant High School and Hillsborough Community College. He later attended and graduated from SUNY Brockport.

== Literary work ==
Giuliano has written extensively on popular music, particularly the Beatles. By 1999, he had authored 20 books, including Dark Horse: The Private Life of George Harrison (1990) and Blackbird: The Life and Times of Paul McCartney (1991).

In an interview for The Guardian in September 1992, Giuliano referred to the Beatles as "real shits in real life" and dismissed Paul McCartney as "just shallow and vacuous". On October 5 that year, George Harrison's wife, Olivia Harrison responded, writing, "like a starving dog he [Giuliano] scavenges his heroes, picking up bits of gristle and sinew along the way." She also complained about Giuliano's use of a quote by Harrison on the cover of Dark Horse, saying: "My husband once made the remark: 'That guy knows more about my life than I do.' Giuliano missed the joke and used it to endorse his book." When interviewed in Los Angeles on December 14, 1992, Harrison said of Giuliano: "Yeah, I met him briefly. I have no way of recalling what year it was. I met him at the home of "Legs" Larry Smith for possibly thirty minutes."

Giuliano's biography of John Lennon, Lennon in America: 1971–1980 (Cooper Square Press, 2000), was similarly controversial. Giuliano said the book was based in part on transcripts of Lennon's diaries given to him by the late American singer Harry Nilsson and on audio tapes recorded by Lennon. Several people close to Nilsson said they did not believe that he ever had the transcripts in his possession; others familiar with the journal and the tapes disputed the accuracy of Giuliano's interpretation. Writing in The Washington Post, David Segal described Giuliano's text as "a highly critical, luridly detailed account"; he quoted Giuliano's response when he was asked to corroborate his claim that Nilsson gave him the diaries: "It's obvious that I'm going to do things in an ethical manner." Steven Gutstein, a former New York assistant district attorney who read the diaries during an early 1980s larceny lawsuit, recalled that they contained "a lot of philosophical musings combined with mundane details of everyday life". Colin Carlson of Library Journal said of Lennon in America, "Non-fans will be put off by this image of Lennon as cad, drug addict, and paranoiac; this often sensationalized account is for voyeurs and fans with deconstructive tendencies and is one of the best, most detailed books available on this subject." Less impressed, a Publishers Weekly reviewer commented, "If Giuliano's own double-talk isn't enough to diminish this work's credibility, his endless, voyeuristic descriptions of Lennon's sexual encounters are."

The 2005 film Stoned: The Wild & Wicked World of Brian Jones was partly based on Guiliano's book Paint It Black: The Murder of Brian Jones (1994).

In December 2021, he wrote an audio book detailing his experiences acting in the 2021 South Korean series Squid Game, where he played "VIP #4". The book was titled Surviving Squid Game, I Am VIP 4.

=== Selected bibliography ===
- Dark Horse: The Private Life of George Harrison (1990)
- Blackbird: The Life and Times of Paul McCartney (1991)
- The Lost Beatles Interviews (1994)
- Paint It Black: The Murder of Brian Jones (1994)
- Behind Blue Eyes: The Life of Pete Townshend (1996)
- Lennon in America: 1971–1980, Based in Part on the Lost Lennon Diaries (2000)

== Acting career ==
As a teenager, Giuliano joined the Tampa Community Theater, starring in productions of Streetcar Named Desire and Macbeth.

In the early 1980s, he starred in Burger King and McDonald's commercials, playing Ronald McDonald in the latter. However, he later denounced his work in these commercials, stating that he had been "brainwashing... youngsters into doing wrong" and "selling out to concerns who make millions by murdering animals" in his role as Ronald McDonald. He appeared in the documentary film McLibel, where he stated that working as Ronald McDonald felt like "the man in the Third Reich who was propaganda minister".

Giualiano played Captain Li in the 2005 film Mysterious Island and Siris in the 2012 film Scorpion King 3; both movies were filmed in Thailand, where he resides. In 2013, he also portrayed Karl Redbeard in the Malaysian action film Vikingdom.

He played a Hong Kong mob boss in the 2020 South Korean zombie movie Peninsula. This role attracted the attention of the producers of the South Korean survival thriller series Squid Game, where he was cast as "VIP #4" in 2021. His role in the series earned him some recognition, leading him to write an audio book on his experiences on the set, titled Surviving Squid Game, I Am VIP 4.

== Personal life ==
Giuliano has been a vegetarian since 1972, and has advocated for vegetarianism and against fast food. He lives in Bangkok, Thailand with his son. He also has a daughter.

In March 2020, Giuliano and his son travelled to India for a "spiritiual pilgrimage". Intending to stay in the country for two weeks, he only brought $2000 in cash with him. However, the COVID-19 pandemic led to international flights to Thailand being cancelled, stranding the two in Jaipur, Rajasthan. Giuliano stated that the two soon ran out of money and were forced to survive on "monkey nuts and bananas" with no fresh clothes. Both of them were eventually able to return to Thailand on a humanitarian flight in October 2020. The incident attracted media coverage in both India and Thailand.
