= Cho Sang-woo =

South Korean baseball player

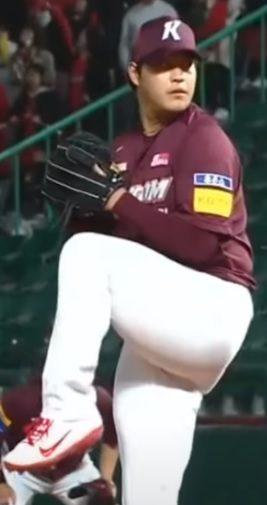

Kiwoom Heroes – No. 11
- Relief pitcher
- Born: September 4, 1994 (age 31); Uijeongbu, Gyeonggi, South Korea
- Bats: Right Throws: Right

KBO debut
- May 15, 2013, for the Nexen Heroes

KBO statistics (through June 21, 2024)
- Win–loss record: 33–25
- Earned run average: 3.14
- Strikeouts: 422
- Saves: 83
- Stats at Baseball Reference

Teams
- Nexen / Kiwoom Heroes (2013–2015, 2017–2021, 2024–present)

Career highlights and awards
- KBO saves leader (2020)
Medals
Men's baseball
Representing South Korea
2015 WBSC Premier12
Gold medal – first place	2015 Tokyo	Team

- Cho Sang-woo
- Hangul: 조상우
- Hanja: 曺尙佑
- RR: Jo Sangu
- MR: Cho Sangu

Cho Sang-woo (Korean: 조상우; born September 4, 1994) is a South Korean professional baseball pitcher currently playing for the Kiwoom Heroes of the KBO League.

Cho Sang-woo, along with Park Dong-won in 2018, has been unable to play since June, being tied to a sexual assault case. No charges were filed.
