= Bead tree =

Bead tree is a common name for several plants and may refer to:

- Adenanthera
  - Adenanthera pavonina
- Elaeocarpus angustifolius, Indian bead tree
- Melia azedarach
