= Knucklebones =

Dexterity game of ancient origins

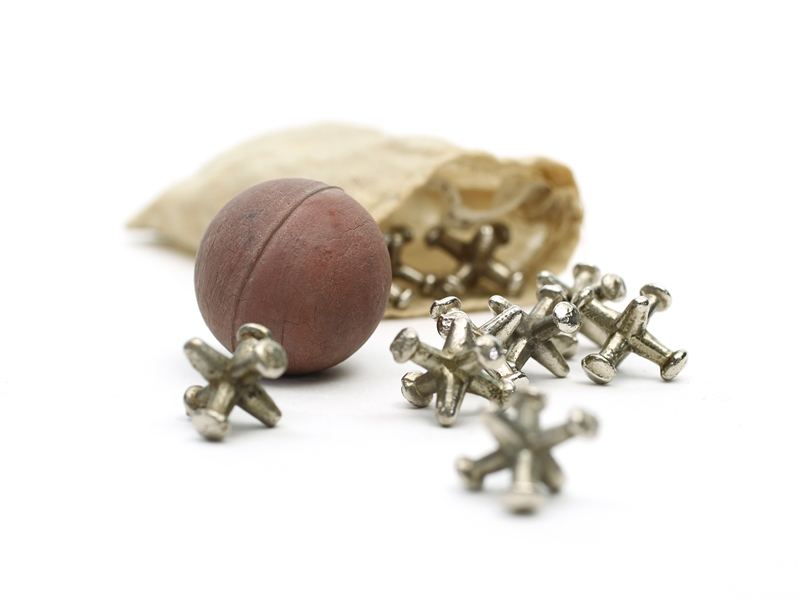
- A collection of jacks within the permanent collection of The Children's Museum of Indianapolis
- Genres: Hand game
- Skills: Fine motor skill

Related games
- Gonggi; Otedama; see § By region

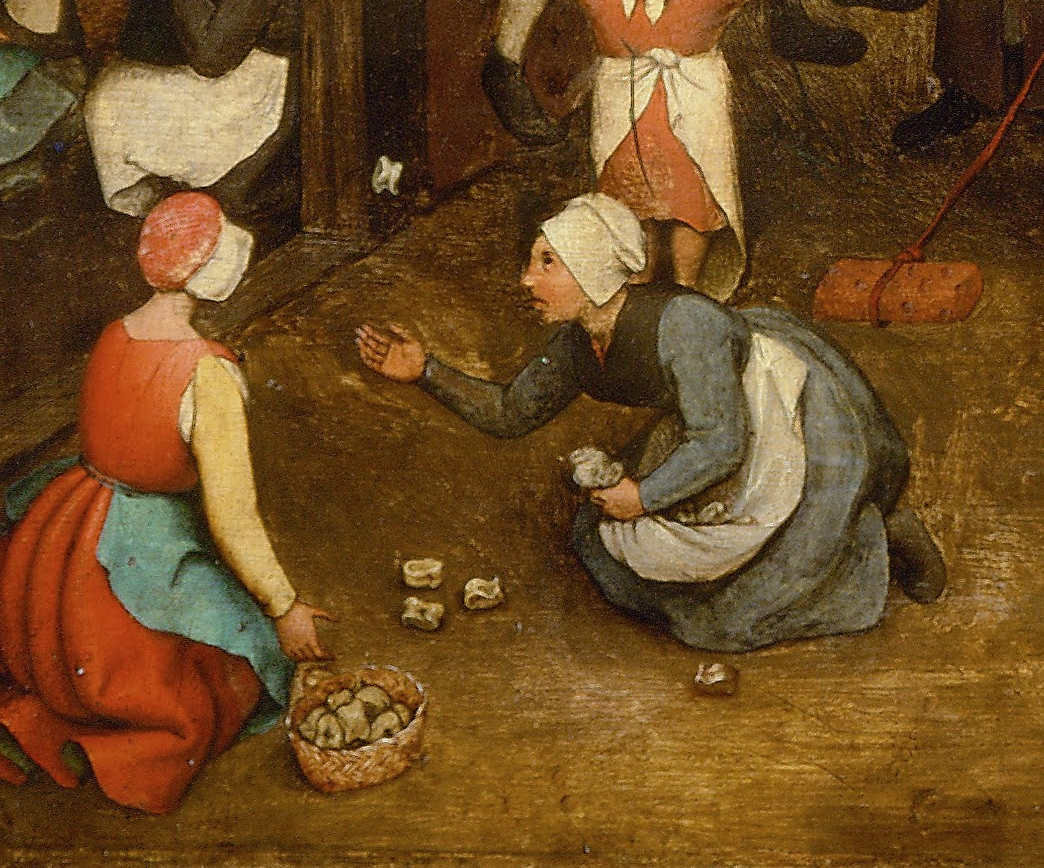
Pieter Bruegel the Elder – Children's Games (detail) – Knucklebones

Knucklebones, also known as scatter jacks, snobs, astragaloi (singular: astragalus), tali, dibs, fivestones, jacks, jackstones, or jinks, among many other names, is a game of dexterity played with a number of small objects that are thrown up, caught, and manipulated in various manners. It is ancient in origin and is found in various cultures worldwide.

The name "knucklebones" is derived from the Ancient Greek version of the game, which uses the astragalus (a bone in the ankle, or hock) of a sheep. However, different variants of the game from various cultures use other objects, including stones and metal cubes.

The game was mentioned by Plato and Herodotus, the latter claiming although the game was famous in Athens it was not native to the city, ascribing Lydian origins to it (West of Anatolia), a story he recounts in his work The Histories.

Modern knucklebones consist of six points, or knobs, projecting from a common base and are usually made of metal or plastic. The winner is the first player to successfully complete a prescribed series of throws, which, though similar, differ widely in detail. The simplest throw consists in either tossing up one stone, the jack, or bouncing a ball and picking up one or more stones or knucklebones from the table while the ball is in the air. This continues until all five stones or knucklebones have been picked up. Another throw consists of tossing up first one stone, then two, then three, and so on and catching them on the back of the hand. Different throws have received distinctive names, such as "riding the elephant", "peas in the pod", "horses in the stable", and "frogs in the well".

== History ==
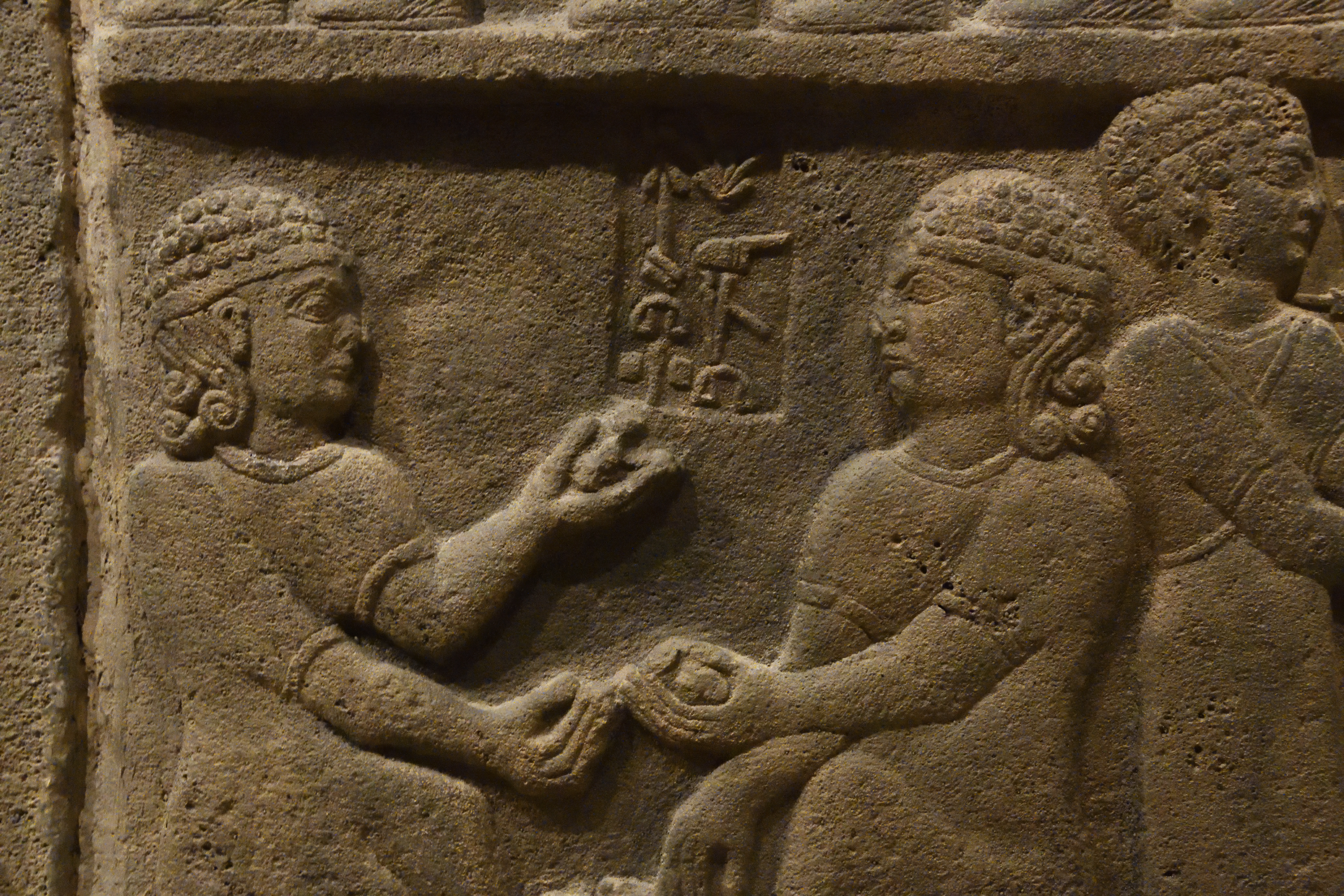
An orthostat depicting people playing knucklebones from Carchemish (c. 8th century BCE)

Knucklebones is of ancient indeterminate origin and has probably been independently invented several times. It is found throughout various cultures worldwide.

The talus bones of hooved animals (also known as astragali) are found in archaeological excavations related to the period starting from 5000 BCE much more frequently than other bones. Astragalus, being almost symmetric, has only four sides on which it may rest and is an early example of the game of chance. Knucklebones are believed to be an early precursor of dice. In contrast to dice, the astragalus is not entirely symmetric, with the broad side having a chance ~0.38 and the other sides having a chance ~0.12. However, variations of the game can also be played with stones, seashells, or seeds.

The game was widely popular in ancient Greece and Rome, and was played by children and adults alike. It was also widely used for gambling and divination, with different faces of the bone assigned specific values.

Ancient Greek tradition and historiography ascribed the invention of knucklebones to various figures. Sophocles, in a written fragment of one of his works, ascribed the game to the mythical figure Palamedes, who supposedly taught it to his Greek countrymen during the Trojan War. According to a still more ancient tradition, Zeus, perceiving that Ganymede longed for his playmates upon Mount Ida, gave him Eros for a companion and golden jacks with which to play. On the other hand, both Herodotus and Plato ascribe a foreign origin to the game. Plato, in Phaedrus, names the Egyptian god Thoth as its inventor, while Herodotus relates that the Lydians, during a period of famine in the days of King Atys, originated this game and indeed almost all other games, with the exception of draughts. Both the Iliad and the Odyssey contain allusions to games similar in character to knucklebones.

== By region ==
=== Central Asia ===
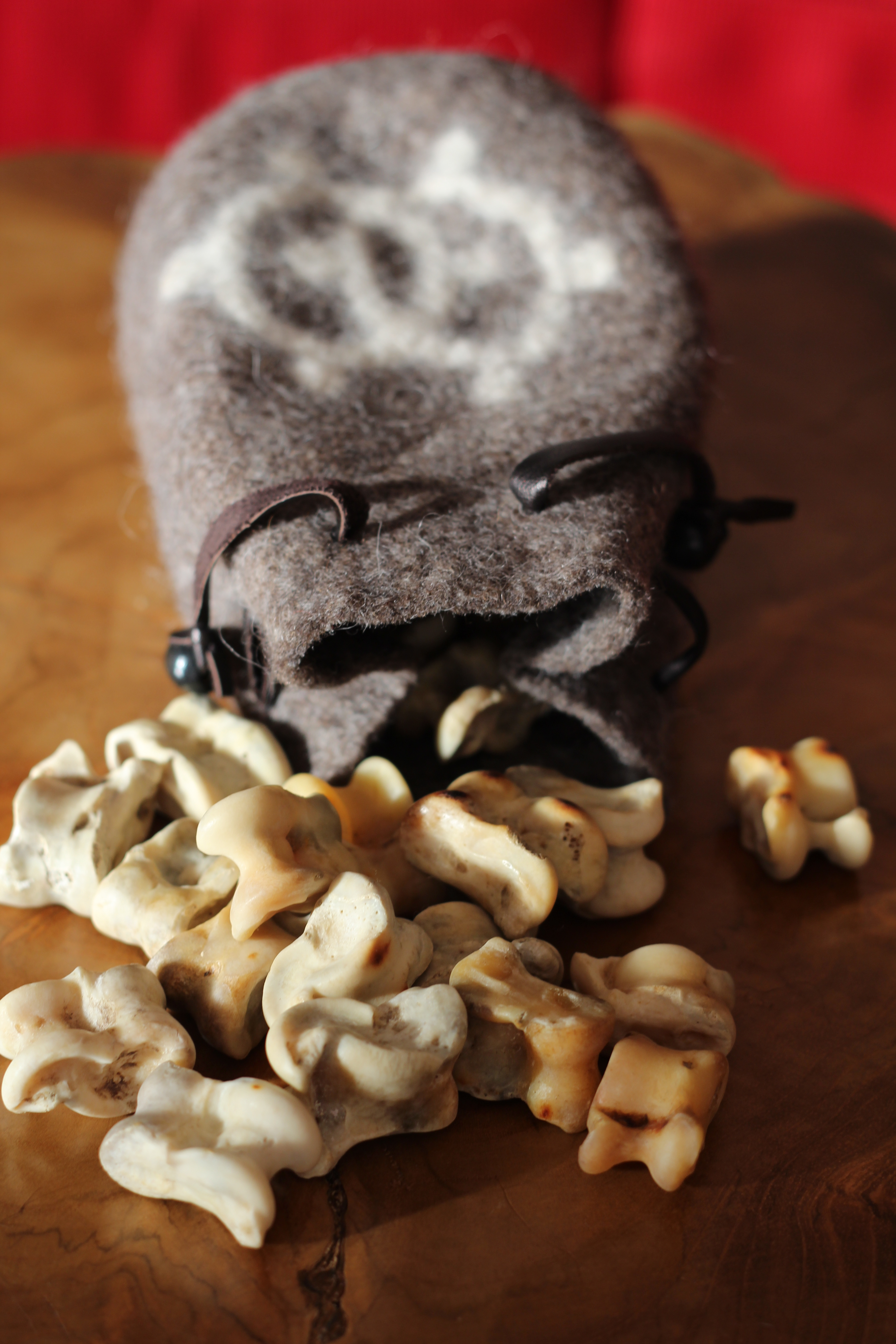
Mongolian shagai pieces

Knucklebones in Central Asian cultures use the astragalus of sheep or goat or the calcaneus of wolves. They are known as shagai among Mongolians, chükö among the Kyrgyz people, kajik among the Tuvan people, asyk among the Kazakh people, ashyk among Turkish people, bujulbozi among Tajik people, and gacuha among the Manchu people. They are used in games, fortune-telling, and as musical instruments. In Central Asian knucklebones, each side of the astragalus has a name (called "horse", "camel", "sheep", "goat", or "cow") and have value in divination as well as dice throwing. There are multiple kinds of games played with knucklebones, including catching thrown pieces on the back of the hand, flicking the pieces into each other on the ground like marbles, tossing another object and gathering pieces, and so on. It can be played with individual players or teams by both children and adults and are common entertainments in cultural festivals. The Mongolian shagai is inscribed in the List of the Intangible Cultural Heritage of Humanity by UNESCO in 2014.

=== Middle East ===
A variation, played by Israeli school-age children, is known as kugelach or chamesh avanim (חמש אבנים, "five rocks"). Instead of jacks and a rubber ball, five small metal cubes are used. The game cube is tossed in the air rather than bounced.

In Turkey and Iran, there is a similar game called "ye qol do qol".

=== East Asia ===
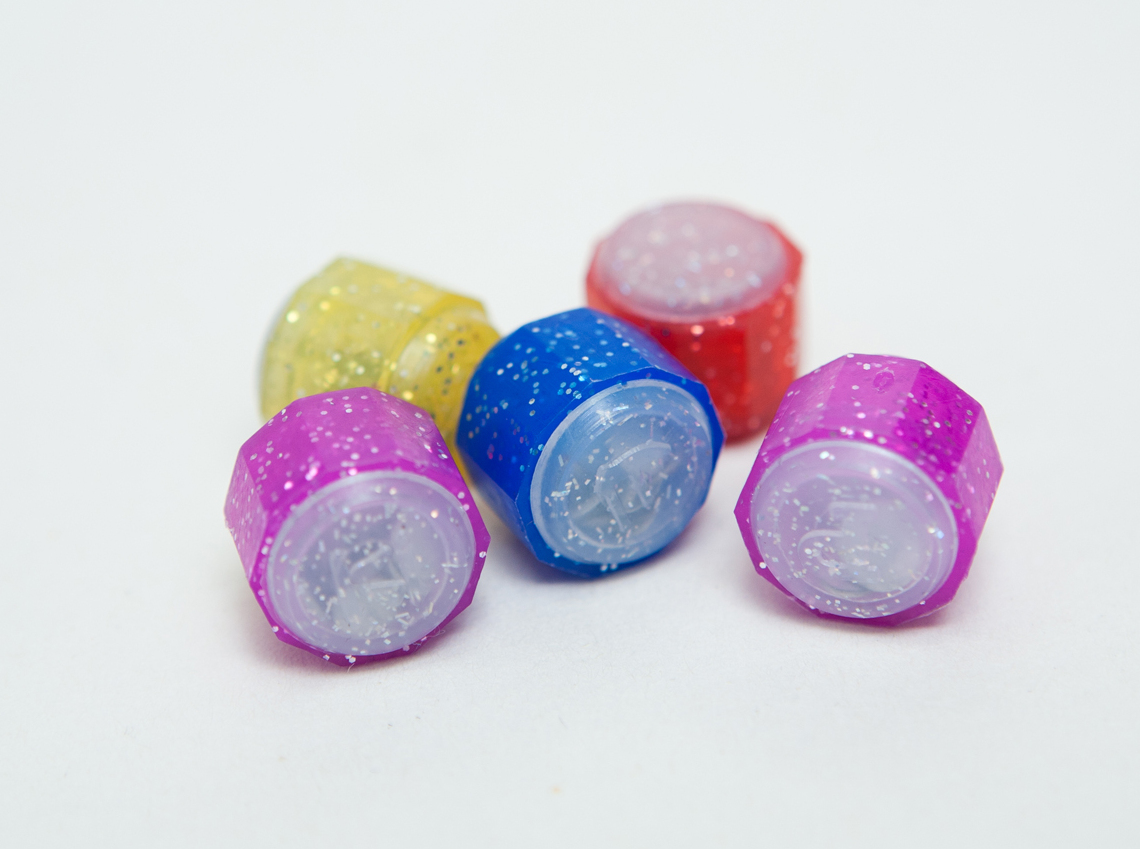
Plastic modern gonggi pebbles from South Korea

In China, the game is called 抓石子 zhuāshízi ("pick up pebbles"). It is played with around seven pebbles or cloth bags filled with sand or rice. The player arranges the pebbles evenly first. They throw one pebble into the air and quickly grab a pebble on the table before catching the falling pebble. If the player touches more than one pebble on the table, they forfeit their turn.

In Korea it is called 공기 (gonggi), also jjagebatgi, salgu, or datjjakgeoli. It involves five or more small pebbles called 공깃돌 (gonggitdol). It has five levels escalating in difficulty and mechanics. The first four levels increases the number of pebbles collected per throw, while in the last level, the players catch the pebbles on the backs of their hand.

In Japan, the game is called お手玉 (otedama) and originated from China during the Nara Period. It uses small bags of azuki beans called ojami. It is played in two ways: nagedama (投げ玉), which is similar to juggling; and yosedama (よせ玉), which is similar to modern knucklebones.

=== South Asia ===
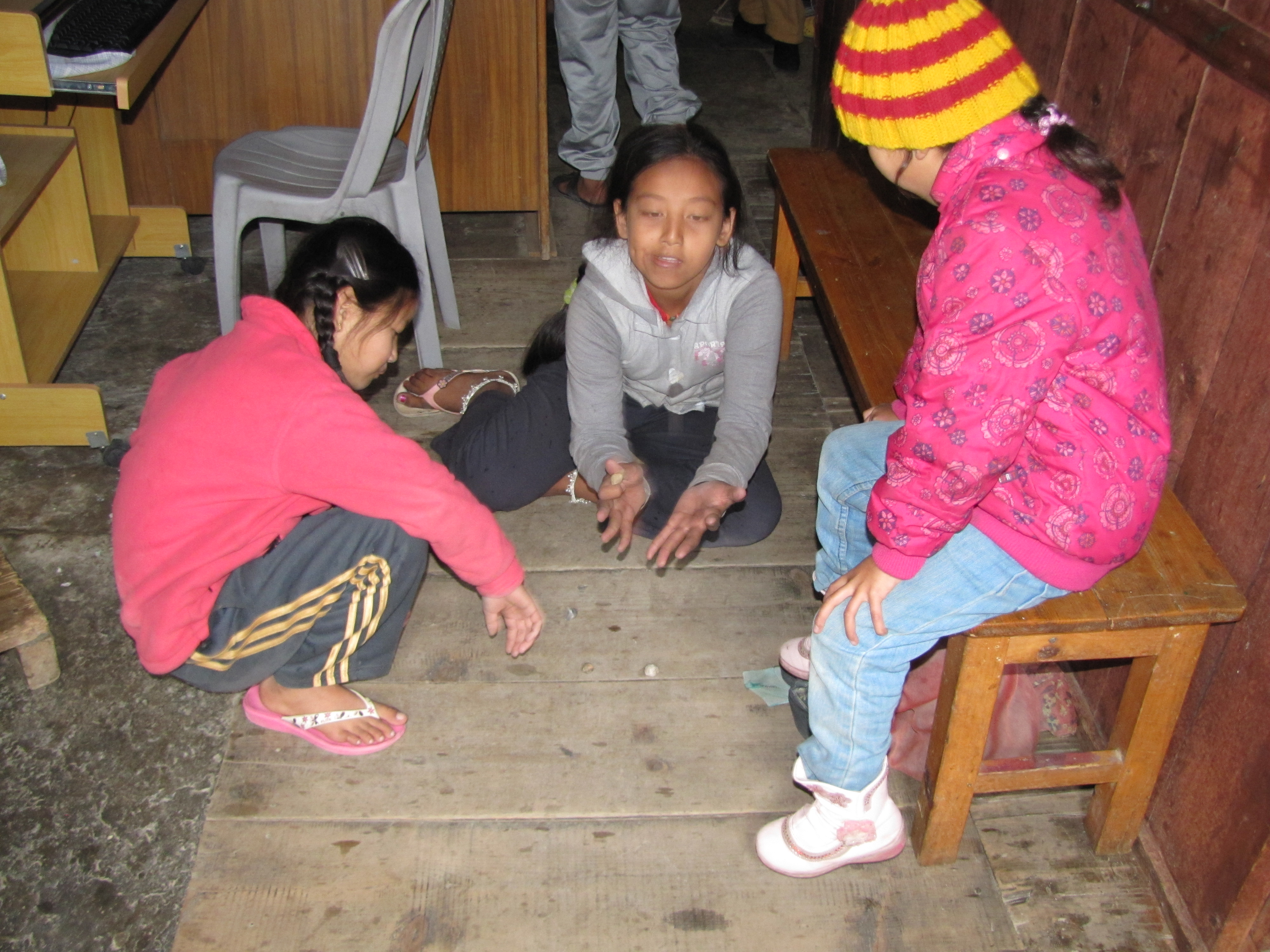
Children in Nepal playing astragaloi

In India, the game is called anju kal in Tamil and panchguti/pansguti (পাঁচগুটি) in Bengali and Assamese ("5 stones"). It is played with 5–7 stones. It is played between two or more players in turn. The game is played in five rounds. Generally for first four rounds four stones are thrown on the floor. The first round is to pick up four stones one by one. The second round is to pick two stones at a time. The third round is to pick three stones together and then pick one. The fourth round is to pick all four in one go. The last round is to toss all the stones from palm and place it on the back of the palm and then catch all four by tossing to above.

=== Austronesia ===
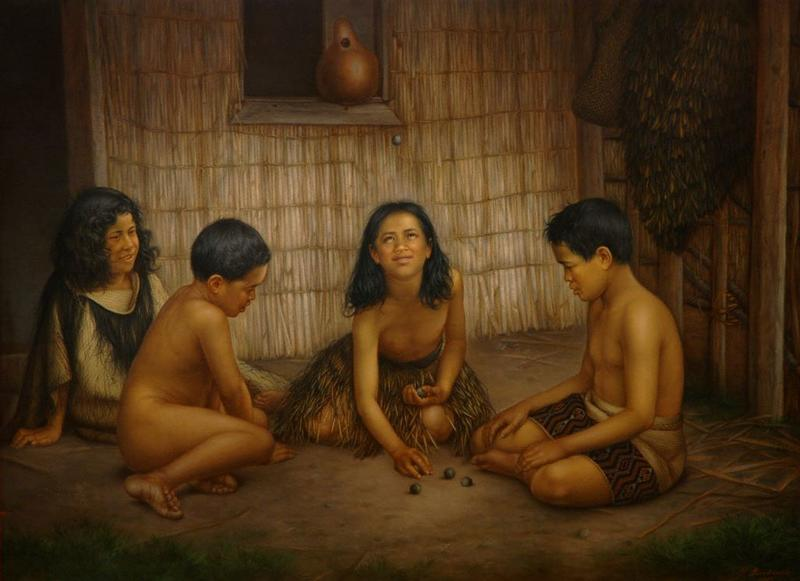
Māori children playing kōruru (Gottfried Lindauer, 1907)

In the Philippines, there are two types of traditional children's games of throwing stones. The first is known as kuru, sintak ("to shake/winnow [grains]"), or balinsay ("to tumble end-over-end"), among other names. It is very similar to modern knucklebones but is indigenous in origin. Instead of a bouncing ball, it uses a larger stone called ina-ina ("mother") that the player tosses up into the air and must catch before it hits the ground. During the throw, the player gathers smaller stones (also seeds or cowries) called anak ("children"). These vary in number but are usually eight to ten pieces. All of these actions are done only with the one hand. The game has multiple stages known by different names, each ranking up in difficulty and mechanics. The first stage picks up the smaller stones by ones, twos, threes, and so on. Other stages include kuhit-kuhit, agad-silid, hulog-bumbong, sibara, laglag-bunga, and lukob. For example, in kuhit-kuhit the player must touch a forefinger on the ground at each throw while also collecting the stones. The last stage of the game is known as pipi, where the losing player is flicked on the knuckles by the player. A variant of the game does not use an ina-ina stone, but players instead just throw the collected pebbles (more than one at a time in later stages).

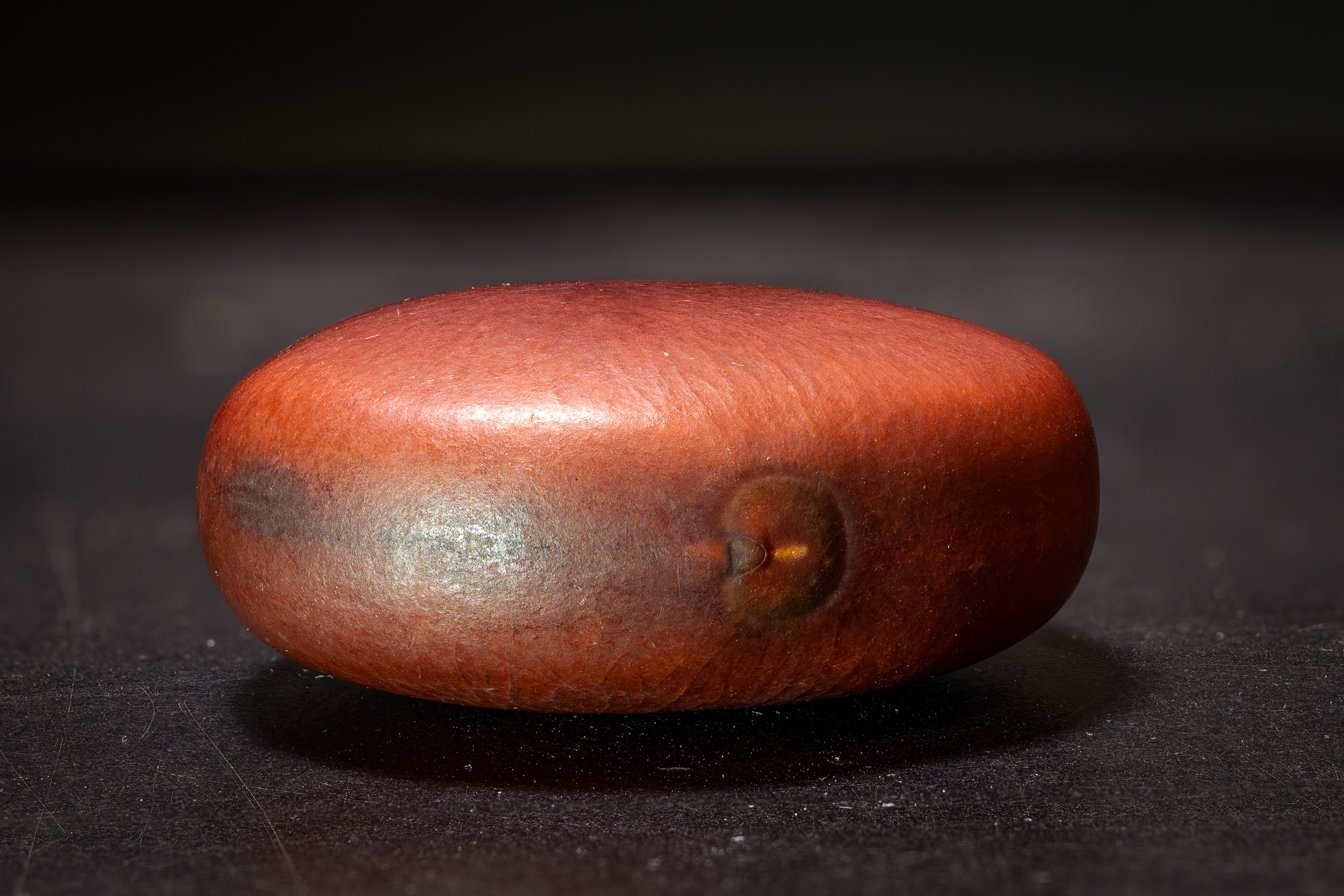
Entada phaseoloides seed used in traditional knucklebone games in Samoa and Fiji

The other game of throwing stones in the Philippines is known as siklot (meaning "flick"). It uses a large number of small stones, shells, or seeds (called sigay) which are tossed in the air and then caught on the back of the hand. The stones that remain on the hand are collected by the player and are known as biik ("piglets") or baboy ("pigs"). The player with the most biik plays the second stage first. The second stage involves the stones that fall on the ground. These are flicked into each other and collected if they hit each other. This is done until the player fails to hit a stone, then the next player does the same thing with the remaining stones, and so on.

In Malaysia, Indonesia, Brunei, and Singapore, the game is called batu seremban (literally "five stones"), selambut, or serembat. Like the name implies, it only uses five pieces, usually stones, seeds (usually Adenanthera pavonina), or small pyramidal bags of sand or rice. It also involves multiple levels of difficulty, varying in the number of stones collected and tossed. It does not have a specialized stone for throwing, though the one picked for throwing is also referred to as the "mother".

In Polynesia, the game is called by various names including kōruru, ruru, kai makamaka, ti kai and tutukai among the Māori; kimokimo among Hawaiians; timo or timo timo among Tahitians; lafo litupa among Samoans; and lavo among Fijians. It was very common among the natives of the Pacific Islands and were documented by early European explorers. It was played by people of all ages and traditionally includes a meaningless rhythmic chant sung by the players. Like in the Philippine version, the game uses only one hand for catching the thrown stones and has multiple stages ramping up in difficulty and mechanics. The names, mechanics, and number of stages varies depending on ethnic group.

Among the Māori, the game uses a marked throwing stone called hai, and around four to fifteen identical but unmarked rounded stones called kai mahi ("workmen"). Sets of these stones were created by hand and kept for the games. In Hawaii, each player has a throwing stone called aliʻi ("chieftain"). The smaller stones were called pohaku. Among Samoans and Fijians, they used around fifty to one hundred flat circular seeds of Entada phaseoloides for the game.

=== Europe ===
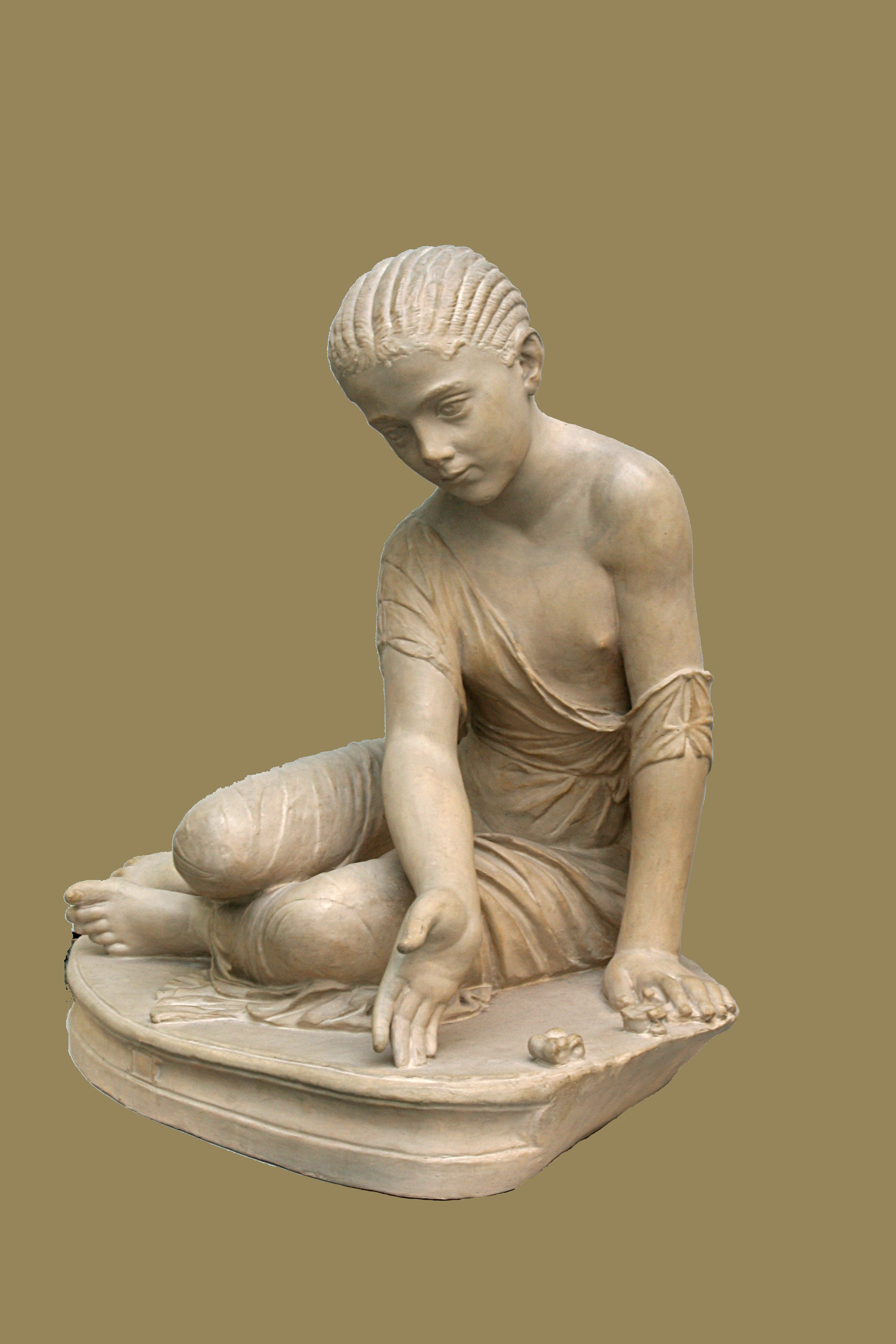
Girl plays with knucklebones Roman copy (2nd century) after a Greek original from the Hellenistic period, Staatliche Museen zu Berlin

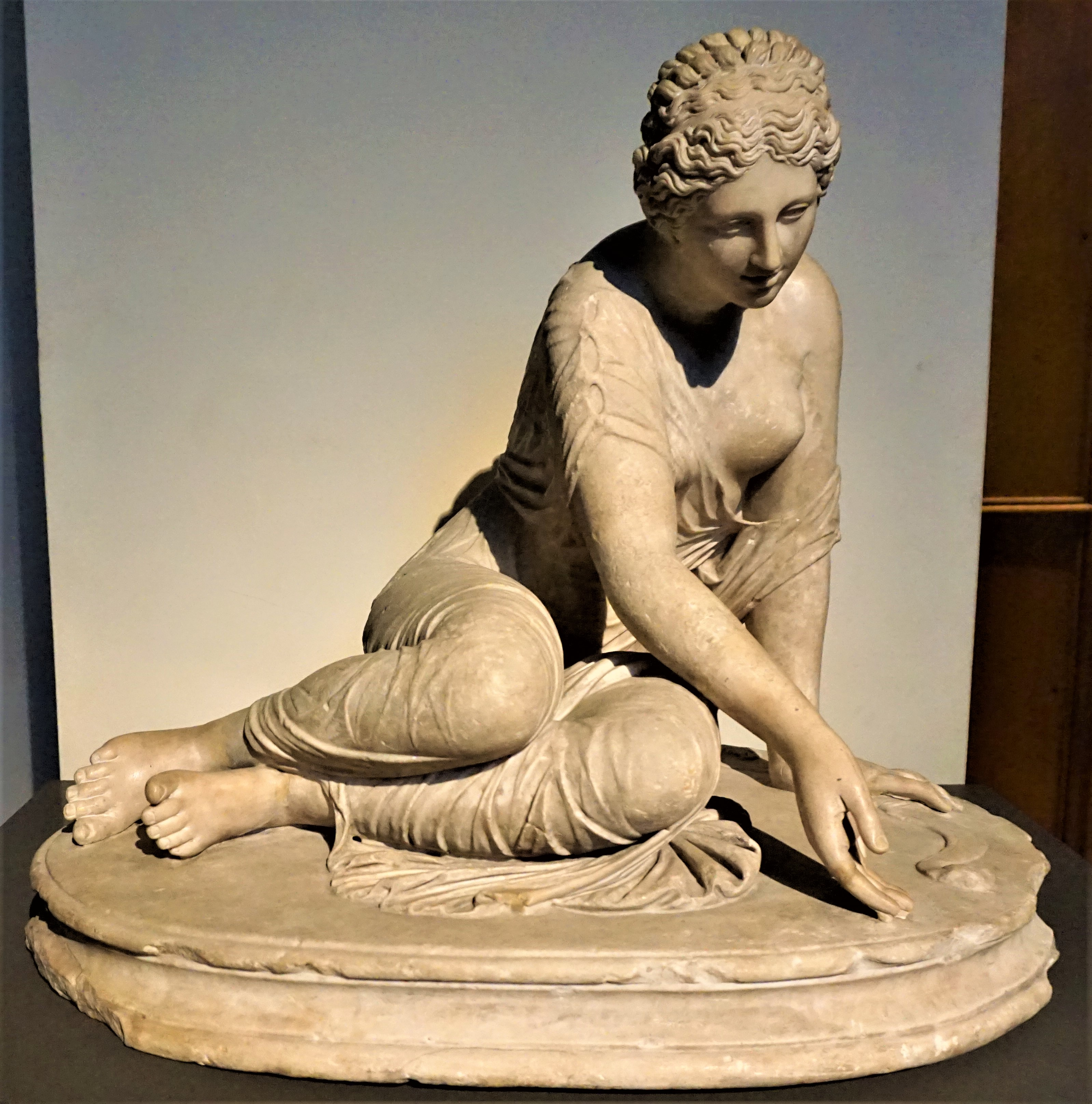
The Knucklebone Player, a Roman statue of a girl playing knucklebones from around 150 AD

There were several methods of playing in ancient Europe. The first, and probably the primitive method, consisted in tossing up and catching the bones on the back of the hand, very much as the game is played today. In ancient Rome, it was called tali: a painting excavated from Pompeii, currently housed in the National Archaeological Museum of Naples, depicts the goddesses Latona, Niobe, Phoebe, Aglaia and Hileaera, with the last two being engaged in playing a game of tali. According to an epigram of Asclepiodotus, astragali were given as prizes to schoolchildren. This simple form of the game was generally only played by women and children, and was called penta litha or five-stones. There were several varieties of this game besides the usual toss and catch; one being called tropa, or hole-game, the object of which was to toss the bones into a hole in the earth. Another was the simple game of odd or even.

The second, probably derivative, form of the game was one of pure chance, with a pastern bone being thrown upon a table, either from the hand or from a cup, and the values of the sides upon which they fell were counted. The pastern bone of a sheep, goat, or calf has two rounded ends upon which it cannot stand and two broad and two narrow sides, one of each pair being concave and one convex.The convex narrow side, called chios or "the dog", was counted as 1, the convex broad side as 3, the concave broad side as 4, and the concave narrow side as 6.

Four pasterns were used and 35 different scores were possible in a single throw. Many of these throws received distinctive names such as: Aphrodite, Midas, Solon, and Alexander. Among the Romans, some of the names were: Venus, King, and Vulture. The highest throw in Greece counted 40, and was called the Euripides. It was probably a combination throw, since more than four sixes could not be thrown at a single time. The lowest throw, both in Greece and Rome, was the Dog.

The game is also called amastarrika, bostarika, bostariketa, boxtarikuan, uztarika, or amaxarri in Basque. In Spanish, tabas is a game of the second type. Among Bulgarians and Gagauzs of Ukraine: ashyk

=== Africa ===
Versions of the game are popular among children of Amazigh origin across North Africa, and goes by a wide variety of names in the various Tamazight dialects.

- In northern Morocco: imadqan, imzreqfan, ibnathin, izla, or tibolatin
- In central Morocco/High Atlas: tibikkas, thisb'iyin, or isgur
- In southern Morocco, particularly Sous: tiqolla, iguntern, ishban, oughayn, oukarn, ibran, or iqoushan
- In eastern Algeria: ijorb'an (in Kabylie), or ilqafen (in the Aurès region, including Chaoui dialect)
- In southern Algeria: issiwa, tikwaten or ikwa (in the Tuareg dialect)
- In parts of the Sahara: khmissa

Some versions of the game can also be found in Eastern Africa (Djibouti, Somalia, Ethiopia. Eritrea, Kenya...).

- In Somalia: jagi jagi (in Northern Somali) or gariir (in the south and Mogadishu).

=== Americas ===
The two forms of the game are present, the throw and catch version is called kapichua, payana, payanga, payanca, or payaya and it is a child's game played with stone pebbles, while the throw and gamble based on position is called jogo do osso or taba and is played with a single cow knucklebone.

Of the first type this game is called:

- In Mexico: paxaque, pinaco, pinyexes, matatena, chibcha
- In Brazil: Pipoquinha, Jogo das Pedrinhas, Belisca, Cinco Marias, Jogo do Osso, Onente, Bato, Arriós, Telhos, Chocos, Aleija Mão, Nécara
- In Peru: yaces
- In Cuba: yaquis
- In Costa Rica: “jackses”
- In Chile: payaya
- In Argentina and Uruguay: payana

From the second type:

- In Brazil: Jogo do osso (game of the bone)
- In Argentina, Bolivia, Chile and Uruguay: taba

== Modern game ==
The modern game may use a rubber ball, and the knucklebones (jacks), typically a set of ten, are made of metal or plastic. There are variants of how the players decide who goes first: it is usually through "flipping" (the set of jacks is placed in cupped hands, flipped to the back of the hands, and then back to cupped hands again; the player who keeps the most from falling goes first), but may be via ip dip, or eeny, meeny, miny, moe, or a variant thereof. To set up the game, the jacks are scattered loosely into the play area. The players in turn bounce the ball off the ground, pick up jacks, and then catch the ball before it bounces for a second time.

An alternative, without a ball and without scattering all the jacks on the ground, is to throw the jacks into the air with one hand, and catch as many jacks as possible on the back of the same hand. The jacks that fall onto the ground are then the ones that the player must pick up. All the jacks that are caught except one are then put to one side. The saved jack is then used instead of a ball, by throwing it into the air and trying to pick up the jacks from the ground with the same hand before catching the tossed jack again with the same hand.

The number of jacks to be picked up is pre-ordained and sequential; at first one must be picked up ("onesies"), next two ("twosies"), and so on, depending on the total number of jacks included. The number may not divide evenly, and there may be jacks left over. If the player chooses to pick up the leftover jacks first, one variation is to announce this by saying "horse before carriage" or "queens before kings". The playing area should be decided between the players since there is no official game rule regarding that.

The winning player is the one to pick up the largest number of jacks, and the game can be made more challenging by playing with fifteen or twenty jacks (two sets). Regardless of the total number of jacks in play, the player who gets to the highest game wins. Game one is usually single bounce (onesies through tensies); game two is chosen by whoever "graduates" from game one first, and so on. Some options for subsequent games are "double bounces", "pigs in the pen", "over the fence", "eggs in the basket" (or "cherries in the basket"), "flying Dutchman", "around the world", etc. Some games, such as "Jack be nimble", are short games which are not played in the onesies-to-tensies format.

== See also ==
- Game studies
- History of games
- List of children's games
- Mancala
