= Coralwood =

Coralwood is a common name for several plants and may refer to:

- Adenanthera pavonina and sometimes Adenanthera microsperma, trees from Southeast Asia and India
- Ormosia krugii, a tree from Haiti, Puerto Rico
- Pterocarpus soyauxii, an African tree

== See also ==
Coral tree
