= Carol Wood (disambiguation) =

Carol Wood is an American mathematician.

Carol Wood may also refer to:

- Carol Wood (musician) for Eroica Classical Recordings
- Carol Wood (writer), who co-wrote romance novels with Rita Bradshaw
- Carol Wood, candidate in Milton Keynes Council election, 2002

== See also ==
- Carolwood, record company
- Carrollwood, Florida
- Coralwood, plants
- Carol Woods (born 1943), actress
