= Mak kep =

Traditional game from Thailand

Mak kep (Thai: หมากเก็บ) or Thai pebbles tossing and picking is the Thai traditional game which is well known to most Thais. There is no accurate period of the invention but it is believed to have been played since the Ayutthaya period. Its origin is unclear. Some sources claim that the game was created in central Thailand, but some say that it is the local game for children in Ranong Province, Southern Thailand.

Mak kep is used to play with the five-round stone pieces in thumb size a thrown up by the order of the game’s rule. The game is suitable for a group of 3-5 people per game.

== History ==
Mak kep is similar to the worldwide game called Knucklebones, Fivestones, or Jacks. The name of this game is based on the location of where the game invented. The rule and how to play the game is similar to Makgeb but the material of the game player is different. Thai traditional mak kep's main material is stones but others are different.

== Material ==
The material used in the game is a few thumb-size chunks of stones. Today, plastic is often used for making it lighter and more convenient to throw.

== Rules ==
1. The players are not allowed to touch the other piece at all during the thrown up steps. 2. The players must not miss catching the leader at any steps. 3. The player must pick up the correct number of stone in each step.

== How to play ==
At the beginning of the game, all of the players need to start by throwing all five stones individually upward and catching them with the hand backwards. The person who catches the most stone, which called Mak in the game, is the first to start the game.

1. The first player throws all of Mak(stones) on the floor. Pick the one up ( This Mak is called the leader) on the floor. Toss the leader Mak up during the throwing player need to pick up one piece on the floor before catching the leader mid-air. Then, repeat for all of the Mak pieces on the floor one by one on steps. (Mae Neung)
2. Repeat the previous step but pick up two pieces at a time. (Mae Song)
3. Repeat the first step again but pick three pieces first and pick the left one later. (Mae Sam)
4. For the last step, the player needs to pick four pieces at one time. (Mae Sii)

The winner of the game is the player who can pick all of the steps in one time. If the players fail before finishing all the steps, they must allow the next person to play.

== The advantages ==
1. Helps children to concentrate.
2. Learn about problem-solving.
3. Practice good sportsmanship for children.
4. Preserve the Thai tradition and culture.
