= Gonggi =

Korean children's game

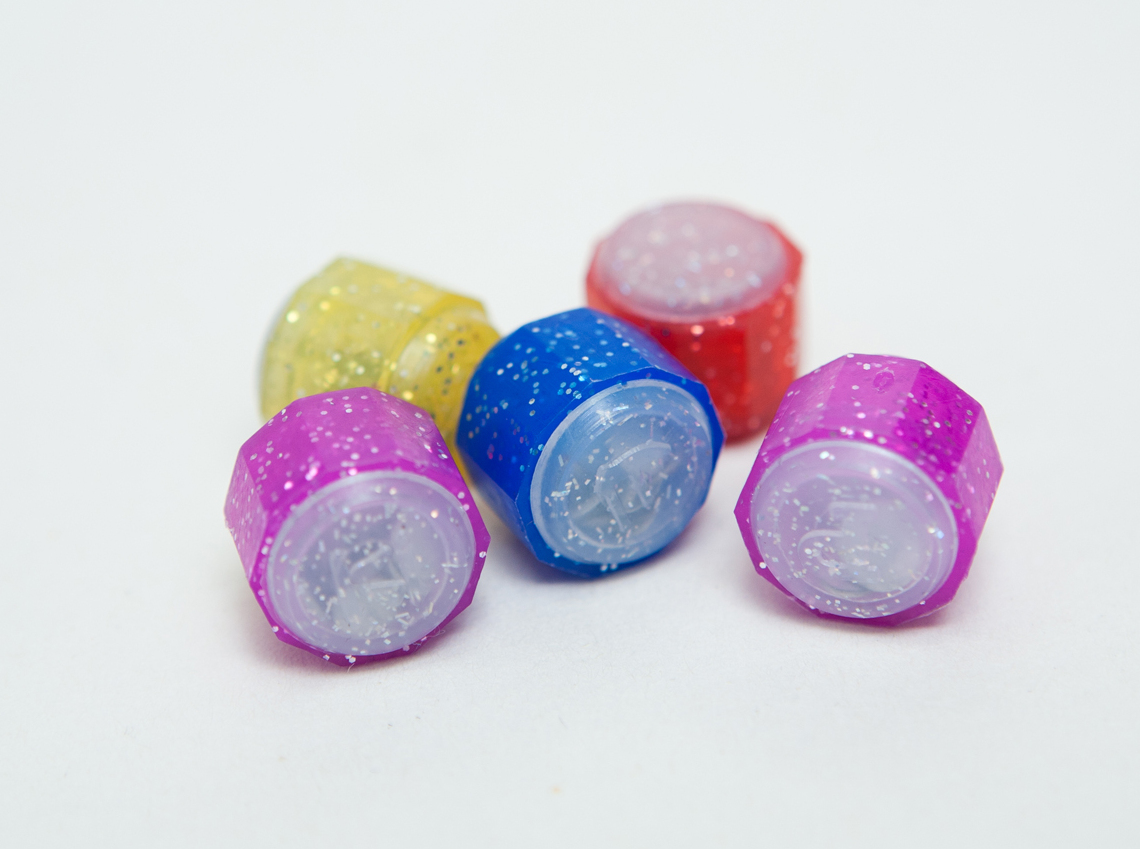
- Plastic grape-sized stones
- Genres: Hand game
- Skills: Fine motor skill

Related games
- Knucklebones

Korean name
- Hangul: 공기; 공기놀이
- RR: gonggi; gongginori
- MR: konggi; kongginori

Gonggi (Korean: 공기) is a Korean playground game that is traditionally played using five or more small grape-sized pebbles or plastic stones. It can be played alone or with friends. The stones are called gonggitdol (Korean: 공깃돌; lit. 'gonggi stones'). The game has five levels of increasing difficulty, testing hand-eye coordination, dexterity, and timing.

Similar games are found in other countries. The game was historically played by Persians, who called it "Yek Ghol Do Ghol" (Persian: یک قل دو قل). This traditional game has been a popular pastime among children in Iran, often played outdoors or on flat surfaces. It is also a popular game in the Kurdistan Region in Iraq, where it is known as "Halma-qo".

The game is also known by many other names, including Jjagebatgi in North Gyeongsang Province, Salgu in South Gyeongsang Province, Trupan in Kashmir and Datjjakgeoli in South Jeolla Province. In English, it is also known as Korean Jacks or Five Stones. More names can be found in 편 2003, pp. 170–171.

== History ==
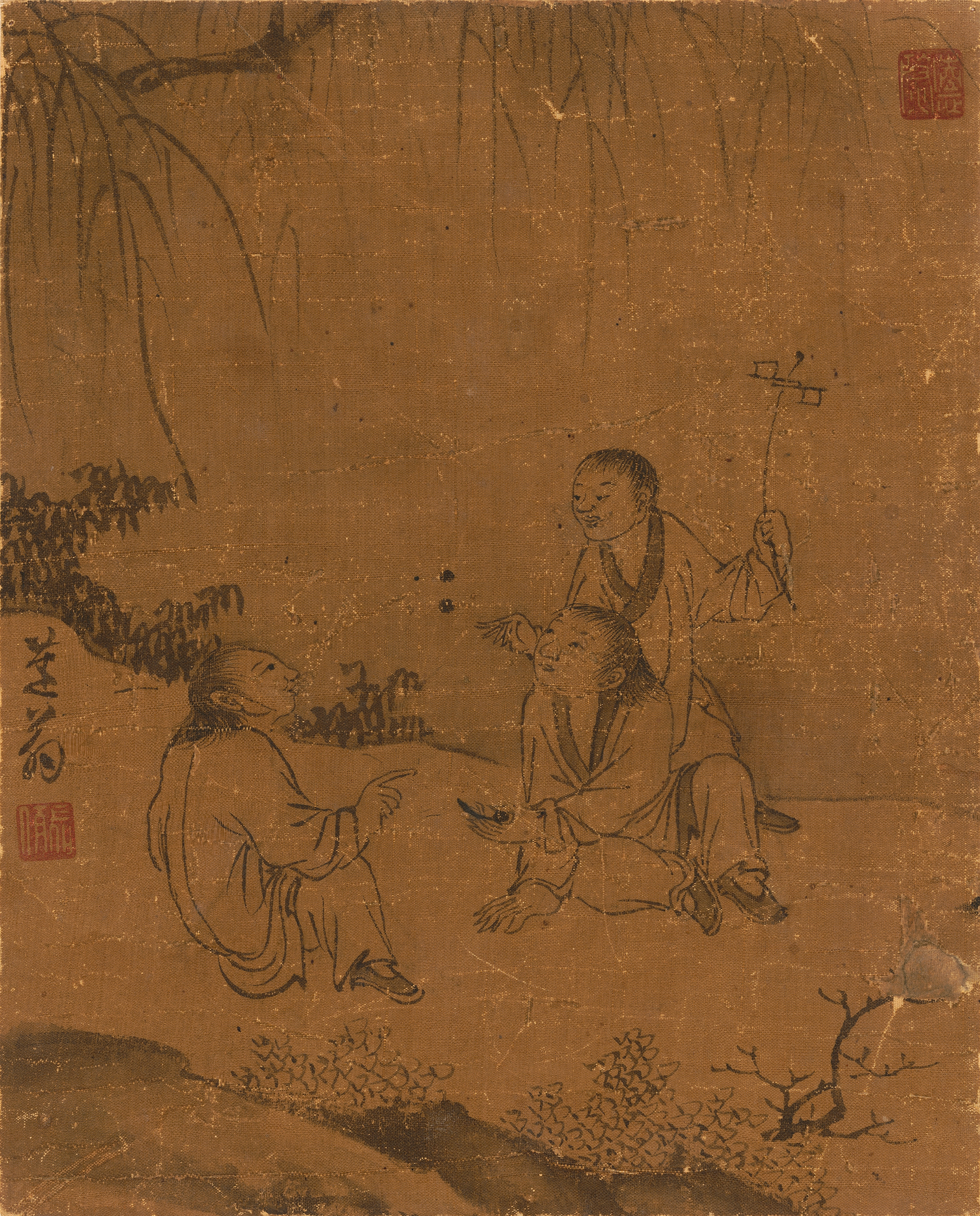
"Gonggi" by Yoon Deok-hee

While gonggi's origins are uncertain, references to the game can be found in the artwork of painter Yoon Deok-hee (1685–1776; 윤덕희) and 19th century text Oju yeonmun jangjeon sango (오주연문장전산고; 五洲衍文長箋散稿). While children used small pebbles or any object of similar size in the past, nowadays the game is typically played with factory-produced plastic stones. Modern gonggi stones contain metal beads that could be taken out to adjust its weight.

In modern times, gonggi has undergone changes, including the invention of the 'crisis' gamemode (see below) and addition of more fine-grained rules.

The game appeared in the fourth episode of the second season of the dystopian Netflix series Squid Game as one of the mini-games making up the "Six-Legged Pentathlon" round, popularizing gonggi in other countries.

== Gameplay ==
There is no single definitive version of gonggi; they have different levels and rules, depending on the region and the individual. Before starting the game, the players choose the number of points or "years" (년) one needs to gain to win. The game generally begins with each player tossing the stones from the palm of their hand into the air. While airborne, the player flips their hand to catch the gonggi stone on the back of the hand. The person with the leading amount plays first. The number of stones is typically five.

How to play gonggi

In the most common ruleset, there are five levels (단). The player who goes through every level without failing wins or gains a point.

- Level 1: Five stones are scattered on a flat surface and the player picks a stone to throw up in the air. While the first stone is still airborne, the player grabs another stone on surface. Then, the player catches the now-falling stone. This is repeated until all the stones have been caught.
- Level 2: The stones are scattered. However, at this level, the player picks up the stones two at a time.
- Level 3: The stones are scattered. This time, the player picks up the stones in a group of three, and then the remaining one.
- Level 4: The player throws one stone in the air, places the others on the surface, and catches the airborne stone. Then the player tosses the same stone again, but this time, picks up the four clustered stones on the playing surface and catches the airborne stone.
- Level 5 (called 꺾기): The player tosses the stones from the palm of their hand into the air. While airborne, the player twists their hand backside up. The stones are then caught on the back of the hand. Then, the player throws the stones in the air and catches them. The number of stones caught amount to the score. There are various tricks in this phase, such as "The Dragon" and "The Clap–Toss".

=== Tricks in Level 5 ===
- Dragon (called Arirang (아리랑) in Korean)

While the stones are airborne, the player switches their hand backside up, catches several stones, switches their hand backside down, and catches the stones that are left over.

- Clap Toss

While the stones are airborne, the player claps their hand before catching the stones.

Both "dragon" and "clap-toss" gives the player twice the score; twice the number of stones.

=== Speed gonggi ===
Once a player has mastered all five levels, they can challenge themselves to do them as fast as possible, a style called "speed gonggi" (스피드공기). World Speed Gonggi Association (세계스피드공기협회), founded by 박대현 with other schoolteachers, hosted their first speed gonggi competition in 2023, which was exclusively for students. In the 2024 competition, the eligibility was extended to the general public, with 58-year-old 임광택 playing the winning 6.57 seconds.

=== Stages ===
A game of gonggi could be extended by incorporating stages (단계). Once a player has completed all the levels, they move onto the next stage, often with different rulesets, some of which are listed at § Variants. For example, a game recorded in Jeolla Province had seven stages, switching between different gonggi variants: 한짝거리 → 두짝거리 → 세짝거리 → 모태 → 꼬치장 → 까불이 → 곱.

=== Crisis ===
In this recent variant, when a player reaches a certain score, the player has to go through a "crisis" (고비). In Korea, the crisis scores are usually the multiples of 5 (5, 10, 15, ...) or numbers that include 3, 6, or 9 (3, 6, 9, 13, 16, 19, 23, 26, 29, 30, ....). When a player reaches a crisis score, the rules change:

- Level 1: The stones are thrown on the playing surface by the player. However, unlike the original game, where the player can choose which stone to throw up first, in crisis, other players choose the first stone for the player. The steps that follow after are the same. While the first stone is airborne, the player picks up another stone on the playing surface. Then, the player catches the stone. These steps are repeated until all the stones get caught.

Since other players don't want the player to earn more points, they choose the stone that is the hardest for the player to carry on. For example, in the first level, if two stones touch each other, other players make sure not to choose either one of the two stones. As a result, the player has to go through a crisis of needing to grab each stone without touching the other stone.

- Level 2 and 3: The stones are thrown on the playing surface again, and like level 1, other players choose the first stone to throw for the player. Other steps are the same.
- Level 4: The player covers their hand over the 5 stones and shakes it on the ground. When another player shouts, "stop!", the player stops shaking. One of the other players picks up one stone carefully and throws it at the other 4 stones. The player picks up the stone that was thrown and continues level 4 by throwing it up in the air, grabbing the other stones, and catching the airborne stone.

Other players try to throw the stone with accuracy and strength in order to make the other 4 stones scatter. The more they scatter, the harder it is for the player to grab at 4 stones at once.

- Level 5: Before the player tosses the stones from the palm of their hand into the air, other players choose between 'even' and 'odd'. The player has to catch that amount of stones on the back of the hand. For example, if other players call out 'odd,' the player has to catch either 1 or 3 or 5 stones. If the player fails to do that, the stones go on to the next person, and the player has to do level 5 again in the next turn.

=== Snail ===
This game is usually introduced to children before they learn how to play gonggi. The only difference between snail and gonggi is how to grab the stone. In snail, the edge of the player's hand has to be stuck on the ground at every step. Instead of throwing a stone up in the air, the player sweeps their hand across the ground in a large circle and grabs a certain number of stones. The number of stones the player has to grab at once is same as gonggi. Snail is an easy way to make oneself familiar with the number of stones one has to catch at each level.

=== Baekdusan gonggi ===
This game is named after the Baekdu Mountain because of its towering height of 2,744m. The fundamental rule of this variant is that the player must throw each stone higher than their head level. Apart from this change, the rules and gameplay remain the same as the base game, with the number of stones the player must throw and grab being the same. The 5th stage is also the same as the base game. In some aspects, this variant is easier than regular gonggi.

=== Maneki Neko gonggi ===
This variant's name comes from the way the stones are caught, resembling the movement of a Maneki Neko's paw. The key technique of this game is for the player to catch the thrown stones overhand, with their palm facing downward. Because of this, it is more challenging than basic gonggi.

=== Genius gonggi ===
This game is taught to people who are adept in playing gonggi. The difference from gonggi is that the player doesn't throw one stone in the air but all stones that are in the player's hand. After throwing multiple stones, the player grabs other stone(s) from the ground and catches all the stones they threw. Like snail, the number of stones the player has to grab is same as gonggi.

== Playing calls ==
There are many playing calls in the gonggi game. The standard calls have been listed here. The penalty for a "mess–up" requires that the player who has perpetrated it pass the stones to the next player.

- A "double touch" occurs when a player physically touches the gonggi stone(s) more than once.
- A "mushroom" or a "diamond" occurs when a gonggi stone is balanced on a diagonal position. In some versions, this orientation may be worth either extra points or the instant end of the player's turn.
- An "overhead" occurs when a player throws a gonggi stone in any distance above their head.
- A "drop" occurs when a player, after catching all 5 gonggi stones, drops a stone on to the playing surface.
- A "fixation" occurs in level 5 when a player deliberately adjusts the gonggi stones in their hand.
- An "interception" is when another person distracts the person who is currently playing.
- A "kong" occurs when a player fails catch the stone at once and catches it by bouncing it on their hand several times accidentally.
- A "movement" occurs when a player moves their position to catch or grab another stone. It is forbidden in the official game but is usually allowed in other games.
- A "tree frog" occurs when a player, in level 3, picks up one stone first, and then pick the leftover three. (The player is supposed to pick the cluster of three first, and then the amount of one)

== International equivalents ==
Similar games can be seen all around the globe.

The game is played in India, especially in, Tamil Nadu and Kerala in the south of the country, under the name gutte or kallu, 'stones', in the north of the country it is played in Kashmir under the name of trup, and in central Madhya Pradesh under the name chapeta . In Italy, the game is known as Gioco delle cinque pietre, created from Romans and Greeks, is actually played in South Italy, in Calabria and Sicily. In Nepal, the game is known as gatti. In Turkey, the game is known as beştaş, '5 stones'. In Ethiopia, it is known as "qelemosh" (Amharic: ቅልሞሽ) in Amharic or "qulba" (Tigrinya: ቁልባ) in Tigrinya. In Eritrea, it is known as "ḥanday" (Tigrinya: ሓንዳይ). In Poland, a similar game was played under the name "Hacele" (or "Koble" in Silesia). In Afghanistan this game is popular among the Hazara children and is called "shighay". It is played by using lamb's leg joint bones. In South Africa, particularly in Cape Town amongst the Coloured community, kids have grown up playing a similar game with pebbles called '5 stones', or 'vyf (5) klippies' as it is known in Afrikaans. The traditional Korean game was played in season 2 of Squid game, Pentathlon. In Greece the game was popular until approximately the late 1970s, under the name pentovola (Greek πεντόβολα).

== See also ==
- Korean culture
- Yut
- Knucklebones
