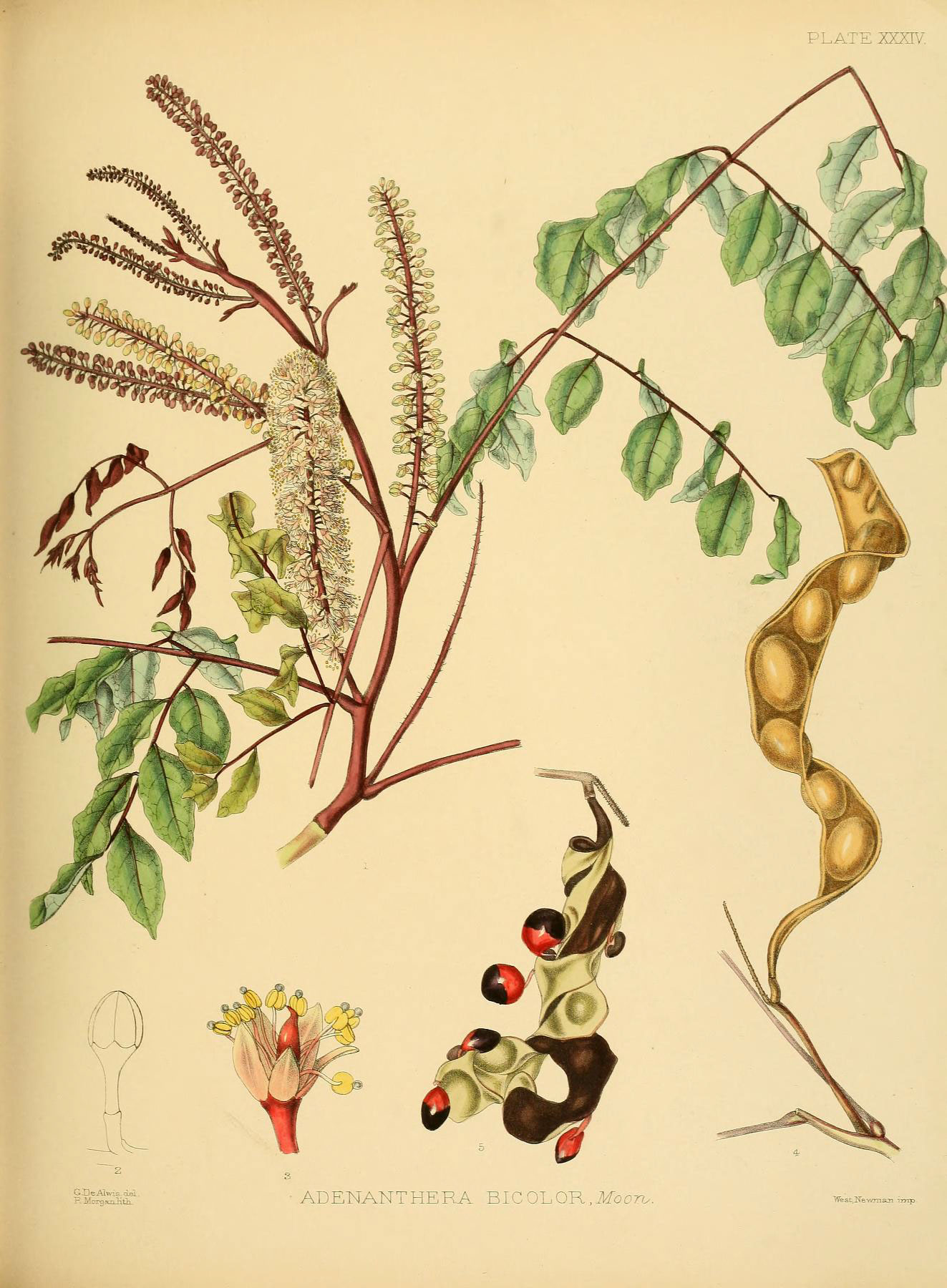
- Botanical illustration of Adenanthera aglaosperma, under the synonym A. bicolor.

Conservation status
- Vulnerable (IUCN 2.3)

Scientific classification
- Kingdom: Plantae
- Clade: Embryophytes
- Clade: Tracheophytes
- Clade: Spermatophytes
- Clade: Angiosperms
- Clade: Eudicots
- Clade: Rosids
- Order: Fabales
- Family: Fabaceae
- Subfamily: Caesalpinioideae
- Clade: Mimosoid clade
- Genus: Adenanthera
- Species: A. aglaosperma

Binomial name
- Adenanthera aglaosperma Alston

Synonyms
- Adenanthera bicolor Moon ex Thwaites, nom. illeg. homonym. post.

= Adenanthera aglaosperma =

Species of legume

Adenanthera aglaosperma is a species of flowering plant in the family Fabaceae. It is a tree endemic to southwestern Sri Lanka, where it grows in lowland evergreen rain forest.

== Taxonomy ==
The species was described by Arthur Hugh Garfit Alston in 1929.

According to the World Checklist of Vascular Plants and Plants of the World Online, the name Adenanthera bicolor Moon ex Thwaites is a synonym of Adenanthera aglaosperma.

== Conservation status ==
It is classed as a threatened species, with an abundance percentage of only 0.06%. The IUCN Red List assesses the species as Vulnerable.

== Possible confusion ==
Its seed, red with a black dot at the tip, can be confused with that of Abrus precatorius.
