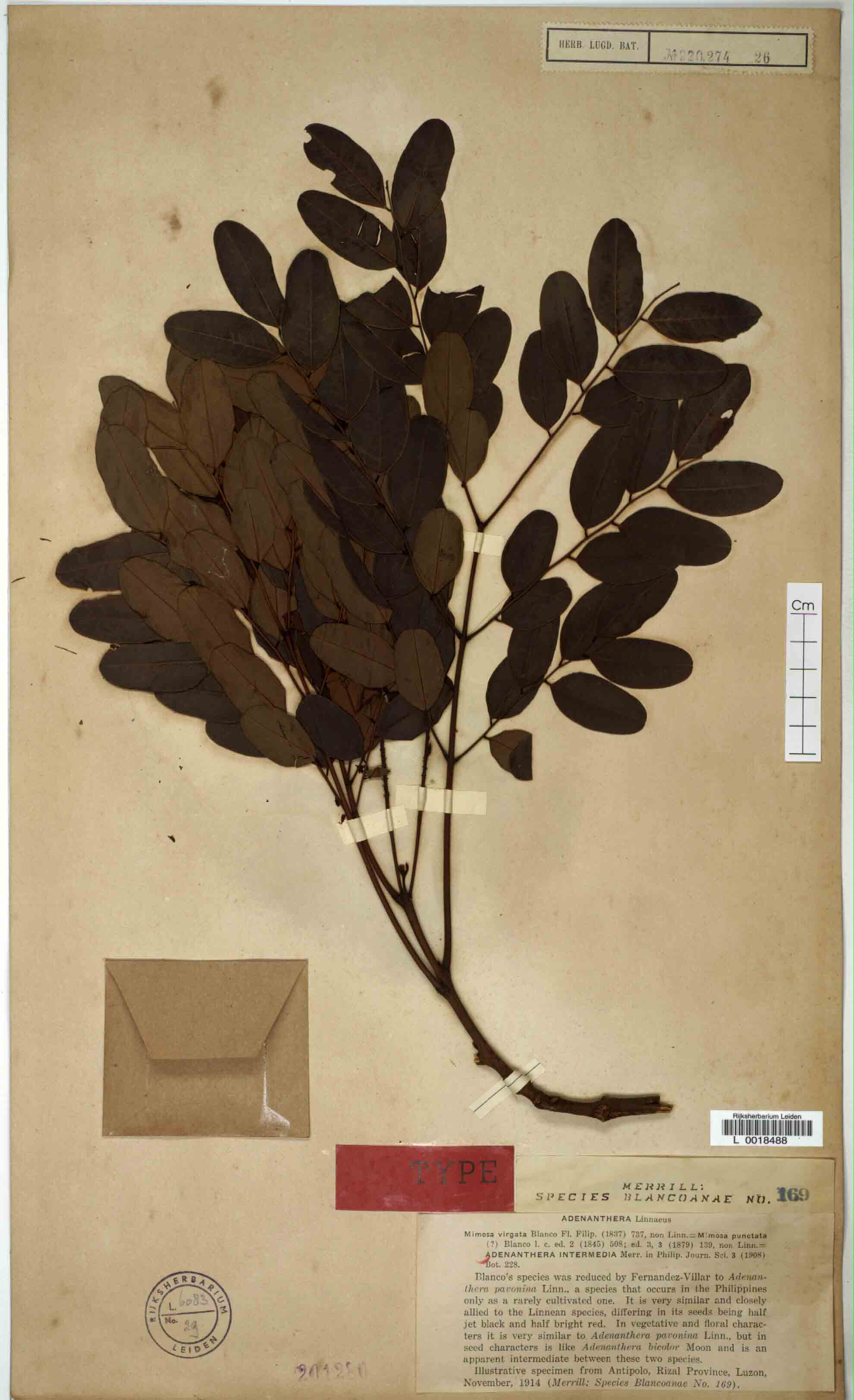

Conservation status
- Least Concern (IUCN 3.1)

Scientific classification
- Kingdom: Plantae
- Clade: Tracheophytes
- Clade: Angiosperms
- Clade: Eudicots
- Clade: Rosids
- Order: Fabales
- Family: Fabaceae
- Subfamily: Caesalpinioideae
- Clade: Mimosoid clade
- Genus: Adenanthera
- Species: A. intermedia

Binomial name
- Adenanthera intermedia Merr.

= Adenanthera intermedia =

Species of legume

Adenanthera intermedia is a species of plant in the family Fabaceae. It is native to Myanmar, Borneo, and the Philippines. In the Philippines it is widespread in Luzon, the Visayas, and Minandao, where it grows in primary and secondary lowland and hill tropical rain forest from about 200 to 800 meters elevation. It is threatened by habitat loss.
