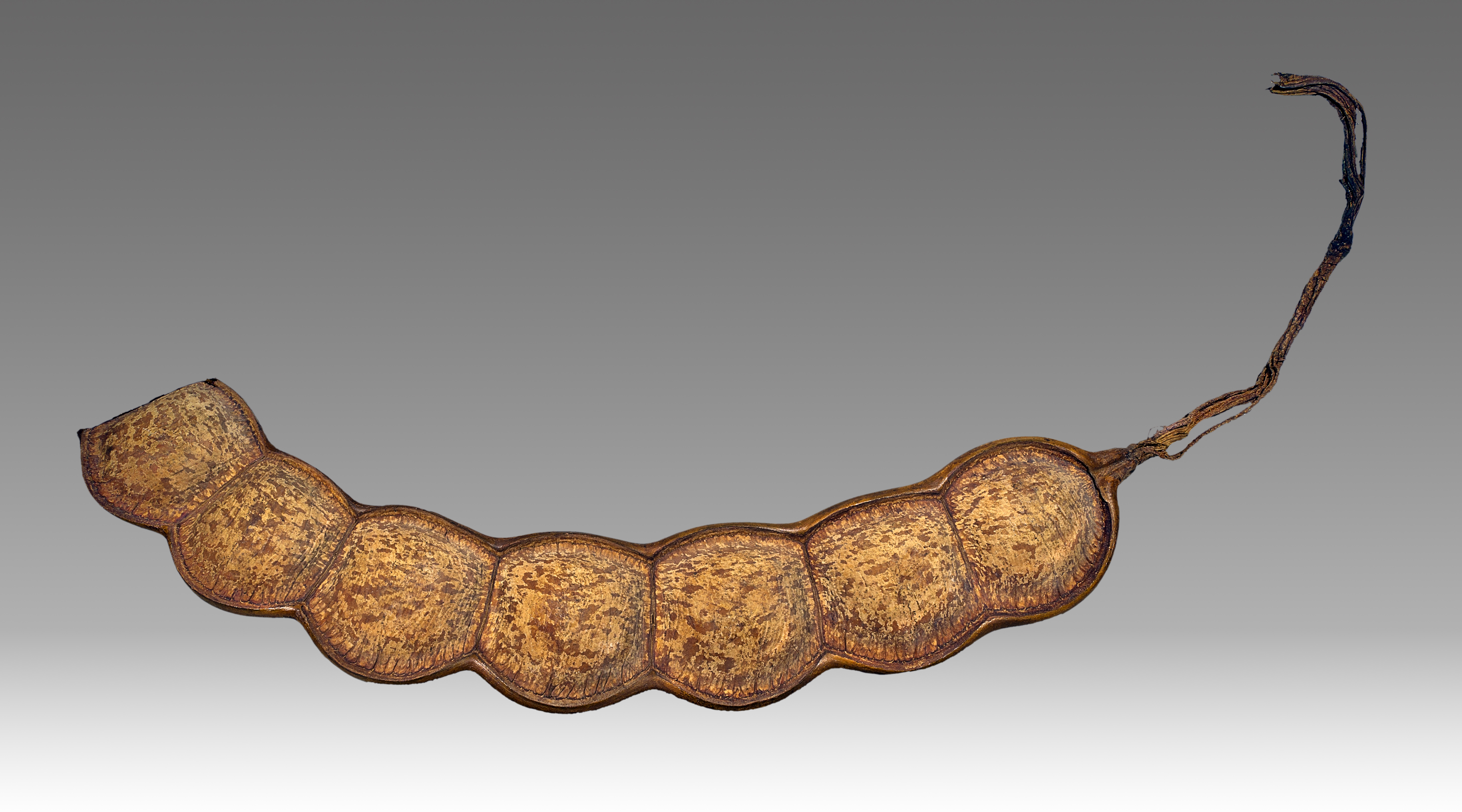
- Pod specimen

Conservation status
- Least Concern (NCA)

Scientific classification
- Kingdom: Plantae
- Clade: Embryophytes
- Clade: Tracheophytes
- Clade: Angiosperms
- Clade: Eudicots
- Clade: Rosids
- Order: Fabales
- Family: Fabaceae
- Subfamily: Caesalpinioideae
- Clade: Mimosoid clade
- Genus: Entada
- Species: E. phaseoloides

Binomial name
- Entada phaseoloides (L.) Merr.

Synonyms
- 20 synonyms: Acacia scandens (L.) Willd.; Acacia sulcata F.Dietr.; Adenanthera gago Blanco; Adenanthera scandens (L.) G.Forst.; Adenanthera scandens Veill.; Entada adenanthera DC.; Entada gandu Hoffmanns.; Entada parrana Spreng.; Entada rumphii Scheff.; Entada scandens (L.) Benth.; Entada scandens var. aequilatera Domin; Entada scandens var. discosperma Jum. & H.Perrier; Gigalobium scandens (L.) Hitchc.; Lens phaseoloides L.; Mimosa blancoana Llanos; Mimosa scandens L.; Perima odorata Raf.; Prosopis scandens (L.) Stokes; Pusaetha scandens (L.) Kuntze; Strepsilobus scandens (L.) Raf.

= Entada phaseoloides =

Species of flowering plant

Entada phaseoloides, commonly known in English as the matchbox bean or St. Thomas' bean, is a large twining vine or liana in the pea and bean family Fabaceae, native to a broad area of Asia-Pacific, from China to northern Australia and the southwestern Pacific.

It is also known as gugo in the Philippines, where the bark sap is used as a traditional shampoo.

== Description ==
Entada phaseoloides is a large woody liana whose stems may reach up to 18 cm (7.1 in) diameter. They are dark brown with a course bark, and are flattened laterally and spirally twisted. The bipinnate leaves are up to 25 cm (9.8 in) long, with 1 to 2 pairs of leaflets, each of which is again divided into 1 to 2 pairs of "pinnules" (leaflets). The pinnules are somewhat leathery, asymmetrical or oblique, and measure up to 10 cm (3.9 in) long by 5 cm (2.0 in) wide.

The inflorescences take the form of a spike measuring around 25–30 cm (9.8–11.8 in) long, carrying numerous sessile flowers. The individual flowers are very small, measuring only about 1.2 mm (0.05 in) diameter. There are five petals, green with a reddish base, measuring about 3–4 mm (0.12–0.16 in) long, stamens about 7 mm (0.28 in) long.

In contrast to the tiny flowers, the fruit of this species is a very large, flattened, woody pod or capsule, measuring about 1–1.2 m (3 ft 3 in – 3 ft 11 in) long and 12 cm (4.7 in) wide. They are usually slightly curved longitudinally, and have about 12 segments, each containing one seed.

The seeds are lens-like, glossy brown and smooth, measuring about 5–6 cm (2.0–2.4 in) wide and long, and 1–1.5 cm (0.39–0.59 in) thick.

== Distribution ==
The matchbox bean is native to a broad area from mainland Asia, through Melanesia to northern Australia and the western Pacific. Regions and/or countries include Tibet, south and southeast China, Japan, Mainland Southeast Asia, Malesia, Papuasia, northern Australia, New Caledonia, Vanuatu, Fiji, and Hawaii.

== Taxonomy ==
This species was first described in 1754 by the father of modern taxonomy, Carl Linnaeus, who gave it the binomial name Lens phaseoloides. In 1914 the American botanist Elmer Drew Merrill, who was at that time halfway through his 22-year stint of working in the Philippines, published a review of the species, in which he transferred it to the genus Entada.

== Uses ==
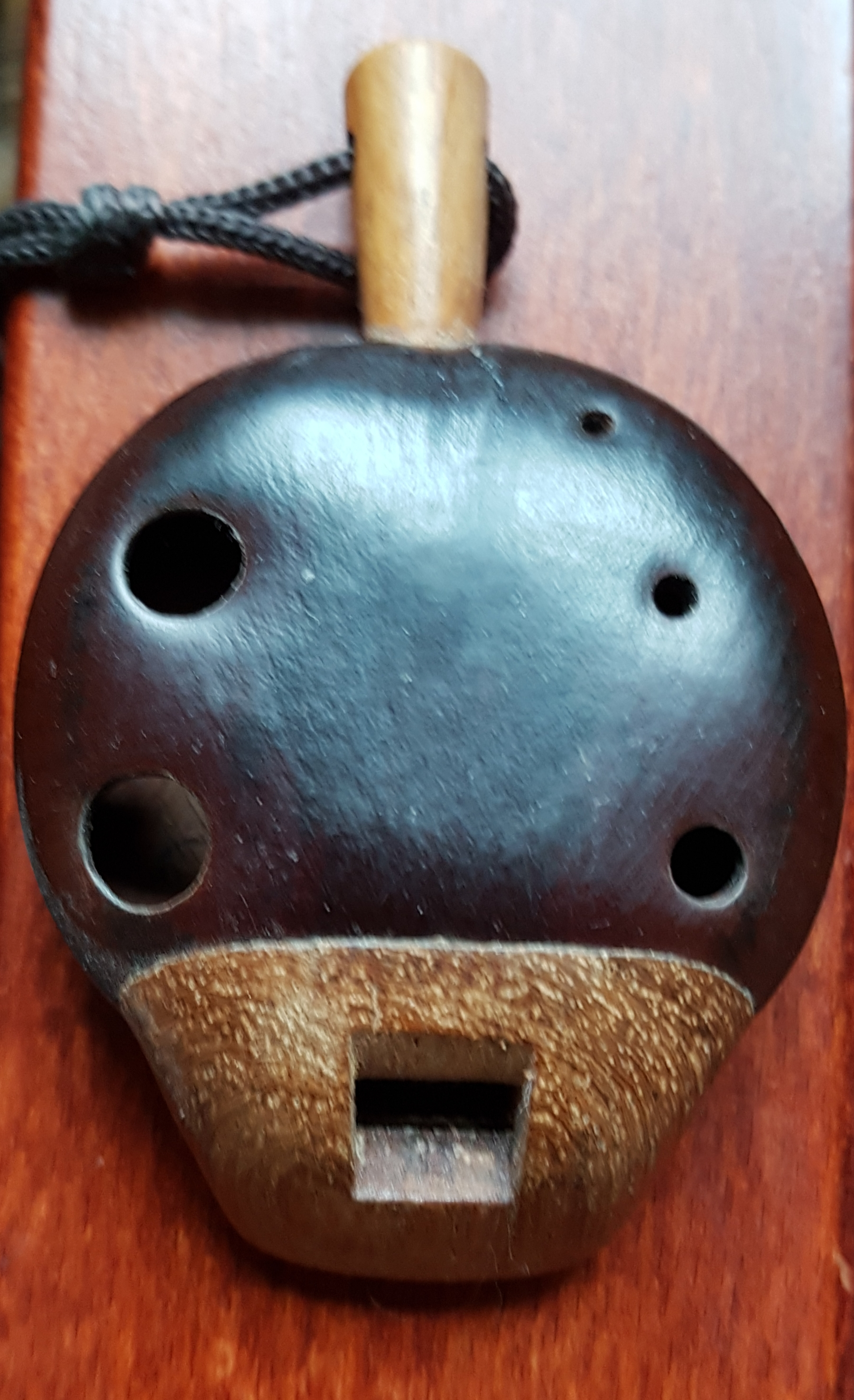
Kiokioca: ocarina made with a seed of Entada phaseoloides

Filipinos have been traditionally using gugo before commercial shampoos were sold in stores. The shampoo is obtained by soaking and rubbing the bark of the vine gugo (Entada phaseoloides), producing a lather that cleanses the scalp effectively. Gugo is also used as an ingredient in hair tonics. Gugo contains saponin, triterpenes, and phenolic compounds. A study by the Philippines Department of Science and Technology found that gugo prevents hair fall because it stimulates micro circulation in the blood vessels.

Tongans use the seeds of this plant (known as paʻanga) as ankle decorations for their traditional kailao dance as well as for use in an ancient game called lafo. The paʻanga is also the name given to their currency.

== Gallery ==
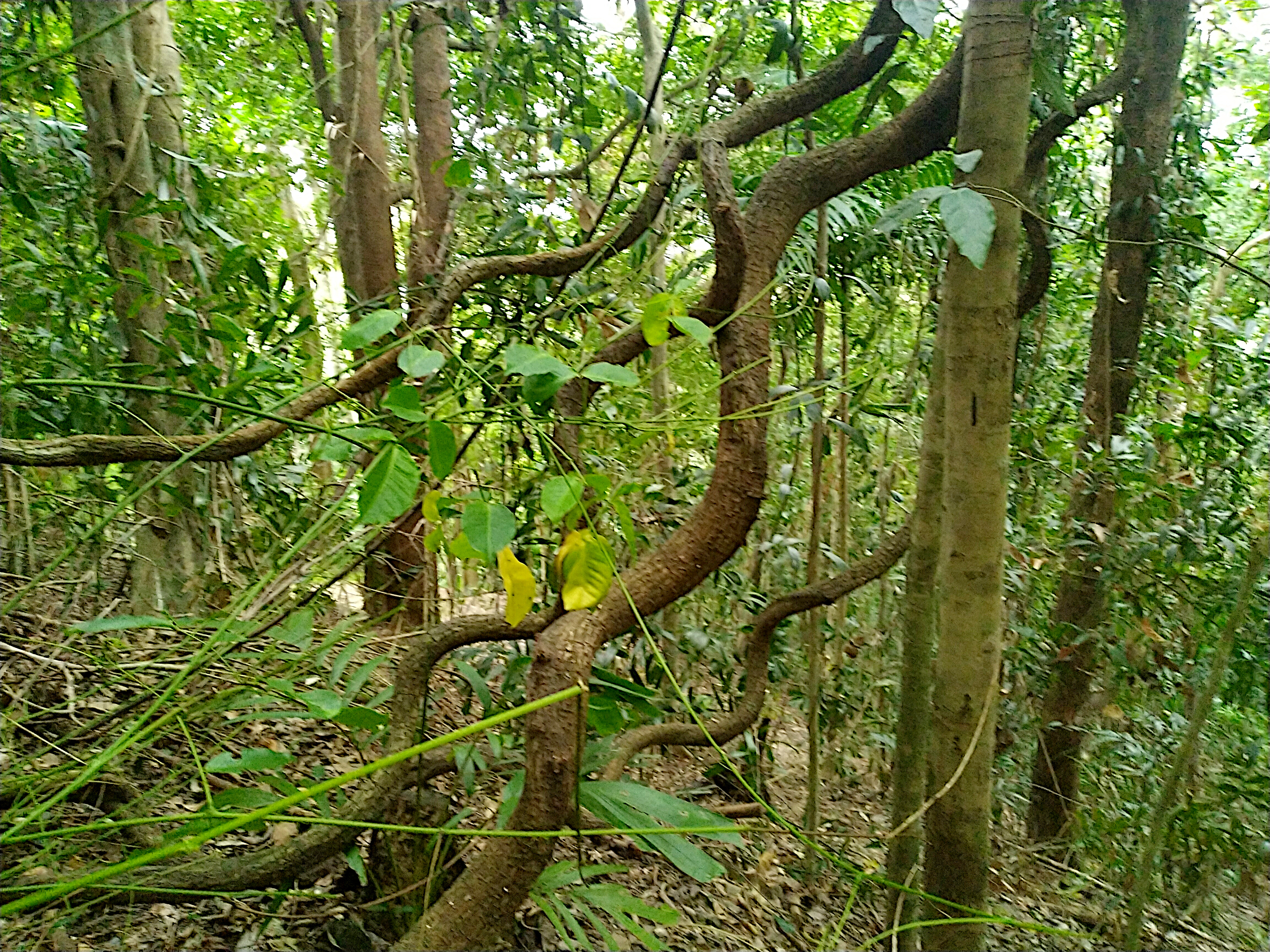
Stems, typical appearance

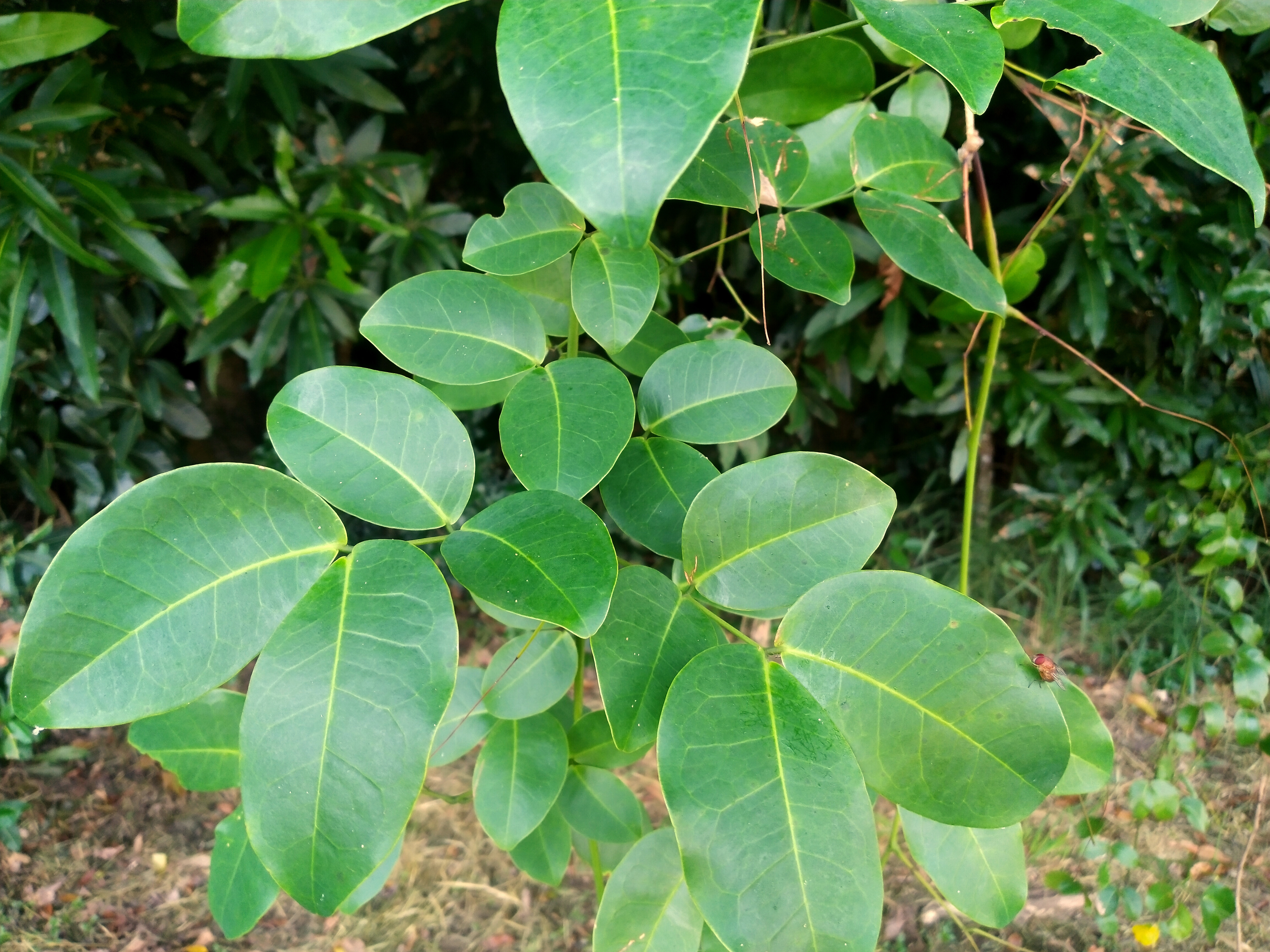
Foliage

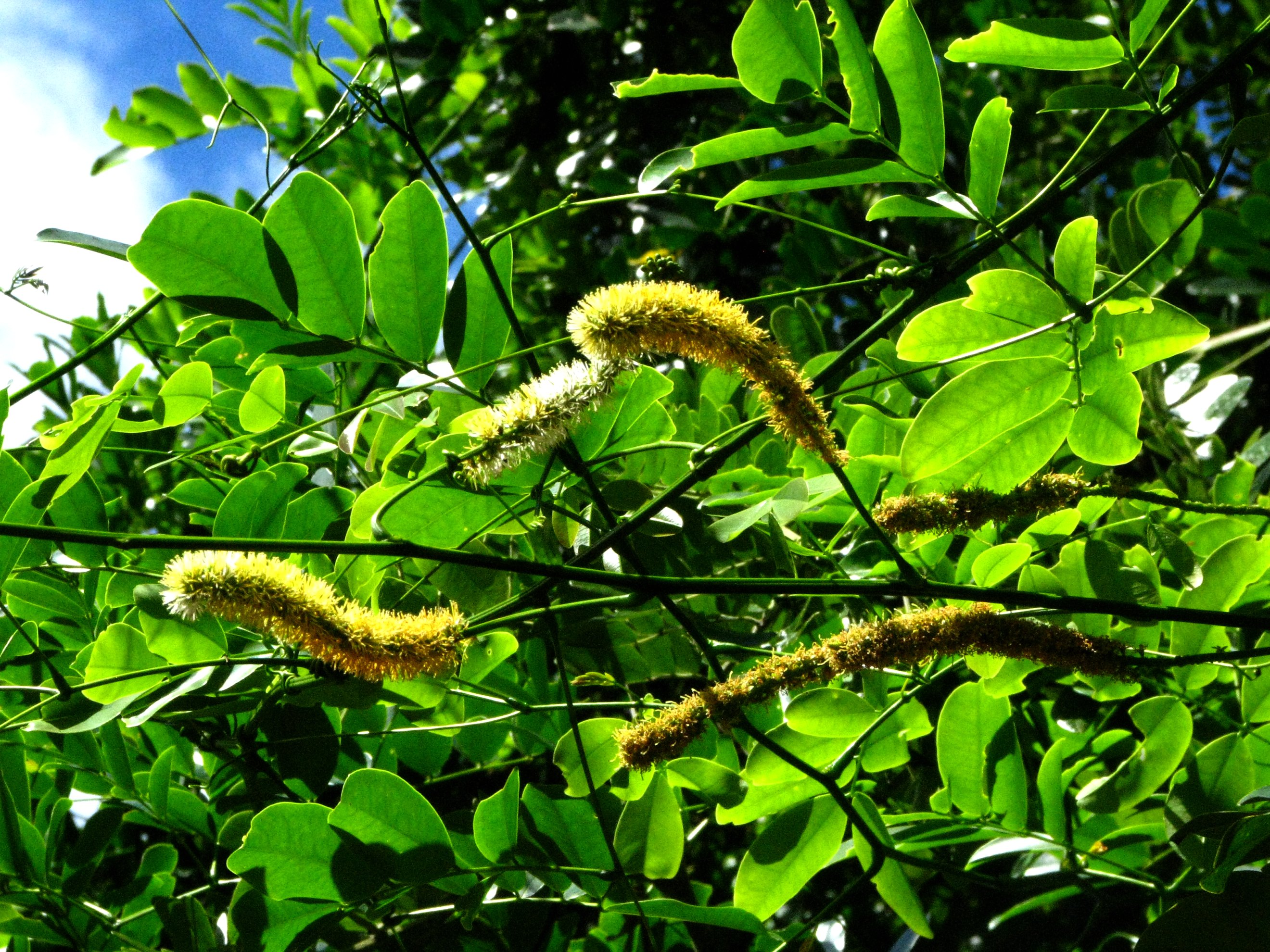
Inflorescences

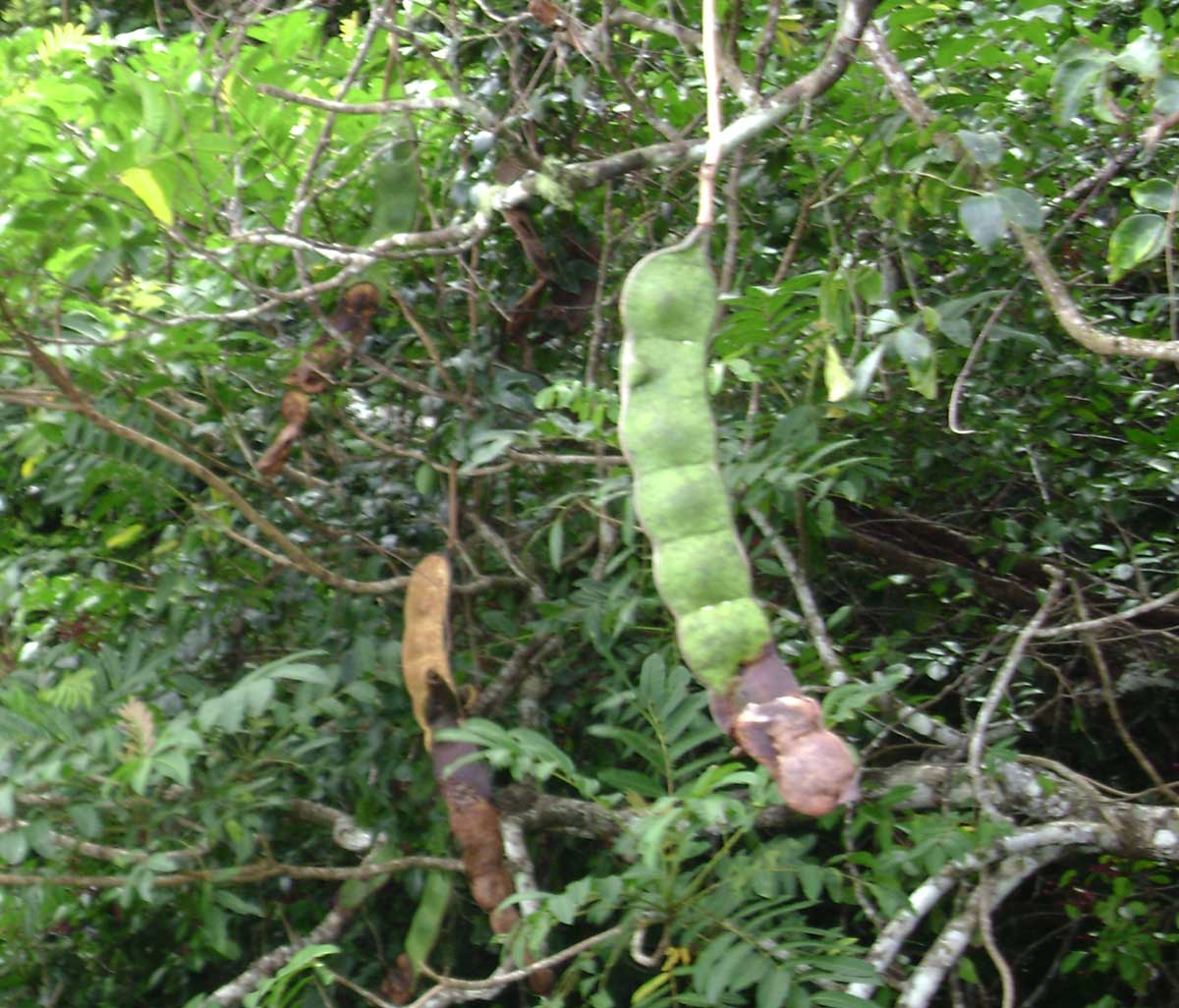
Pod (fruit)

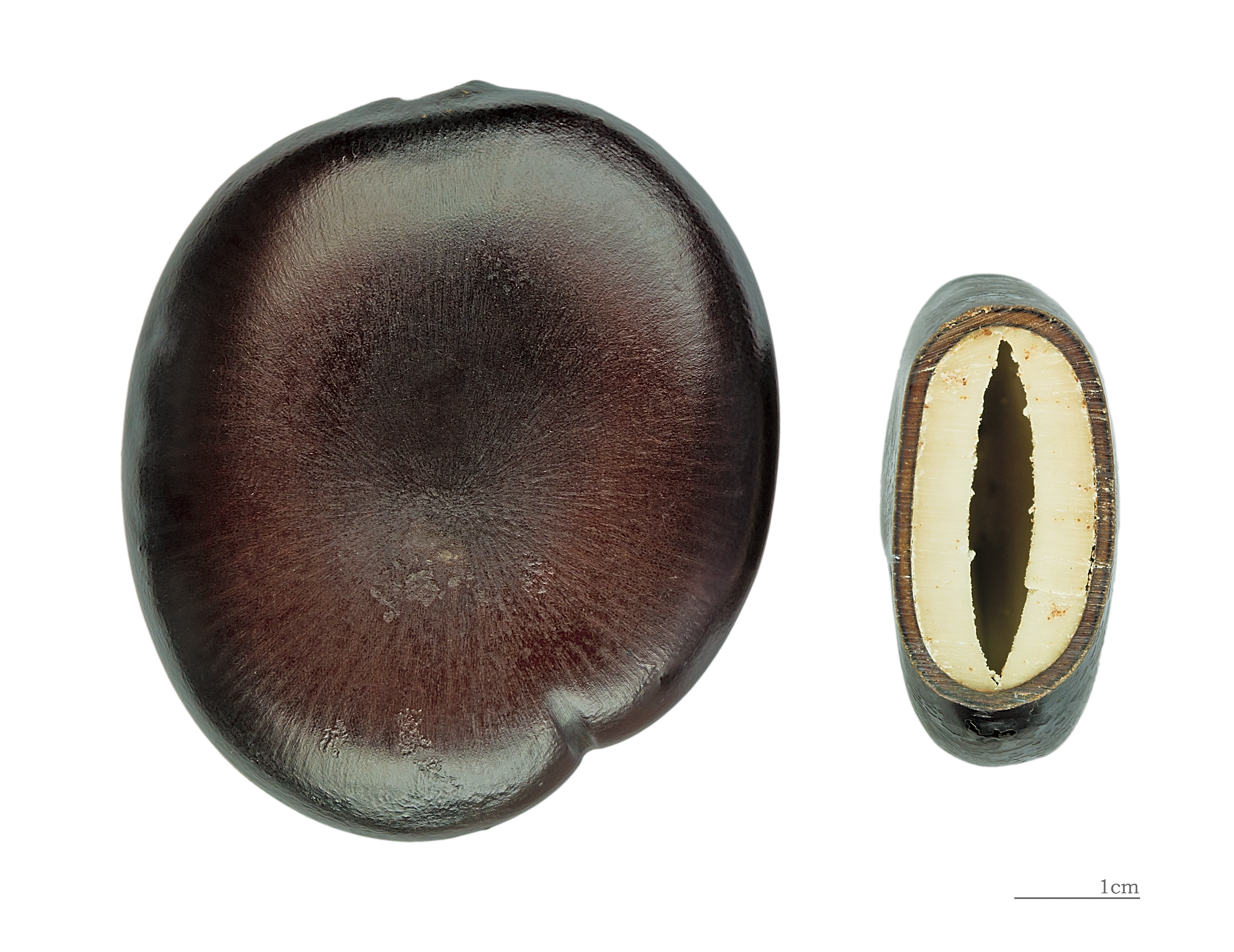
Seed, entire and cross-section
