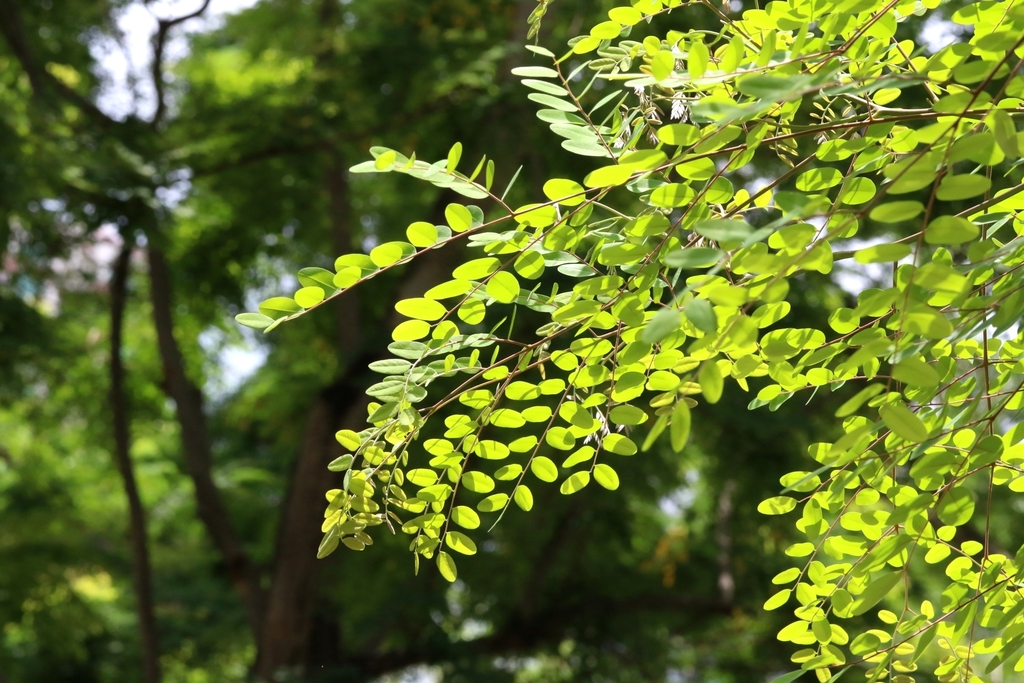

Conservation status
- Least Concern (IUCN 3.1)

Scientific classification
- Kingdom: Plantae
- Clade: Embryophytes
- Clade: Tracheophytes
- Clade: Angiosperms
- Clade: Eudicots
- Clade: Rosids
- Order: Fabales
- Family: Fabaceae
- Subfamily: Caesalpinioideae
- Clade: Mimosoid clade
- Genus: Adenanthera
- Species: A. microsperma

Binomial name
- Adenanthera microsperma Teijsm. & Binn.

= Adenanthera microsperma =

Species of flowering plant

Adenanthera microsperma is a species of tree native to Southern China, Hong Kong, Taiwan, and Southeast Asia, including Cambodia, Indonesia, Laos, Malaysia, Myanmar, and Vietnam.

The generic name Adenanthera comes from the Greek words aden, meaning "gland," and anthera, meaning "anther," referring to the small glands present on the anthers.

== Description ==
This species is a large deciduous tree that can reach up to 20 meters (66 ft) in height. Its bark isgrey, smooth, and slightly exfoliating in thin scales, while the branchlets are finely puberulent. The leaves are alternateand bipinnately compound, with 3–5 pairs of subopposite pinnae, each bearing 4–7 pairs of alternate leaflets. The petioles and rachis are pubescent. Leaflet blades are oblong to ovate, broadly obtuse at both ends, and puberulent on both surfaces, with the underside appearing light green. The petiole is relatively short, and the compound rachis is reddish-brown with a shallow longitudinal groove on its surface. The flowers are arranged in axillary racemes or terminal panicles and are golden-yellow or white. The fruits are narrowly oblong pods that twist when they split open, revealing red, glossy, oblate seeds.

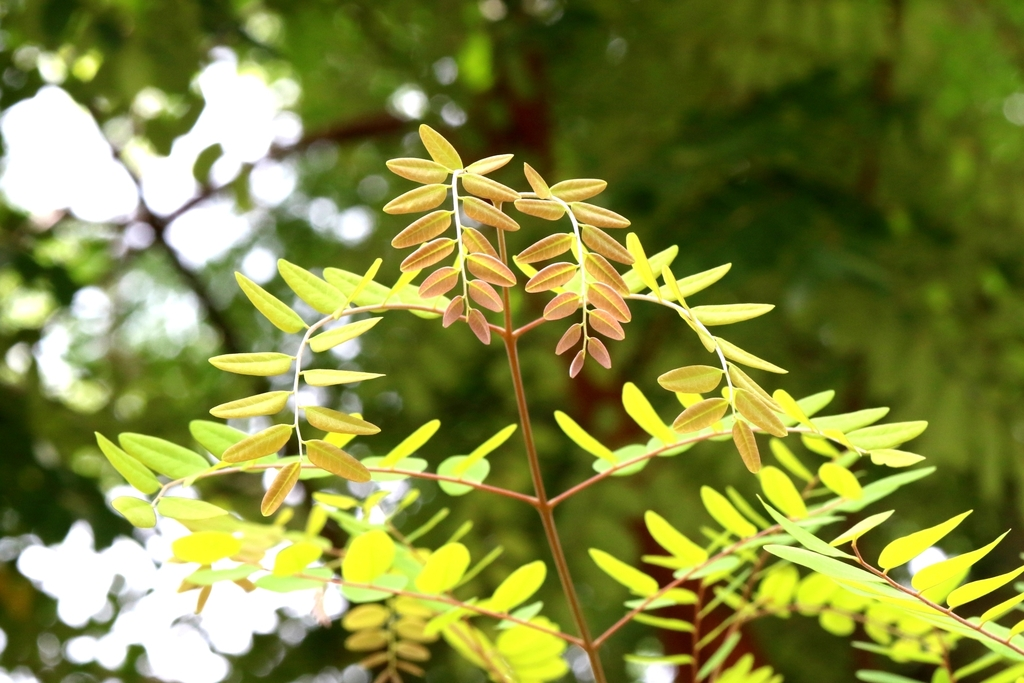

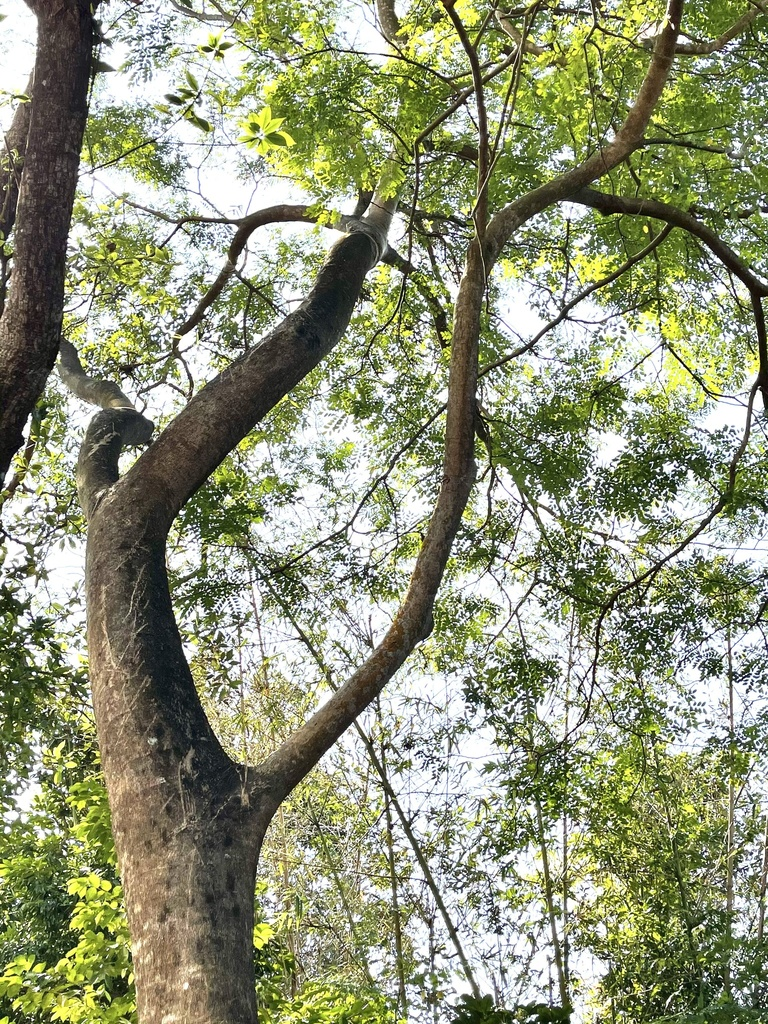

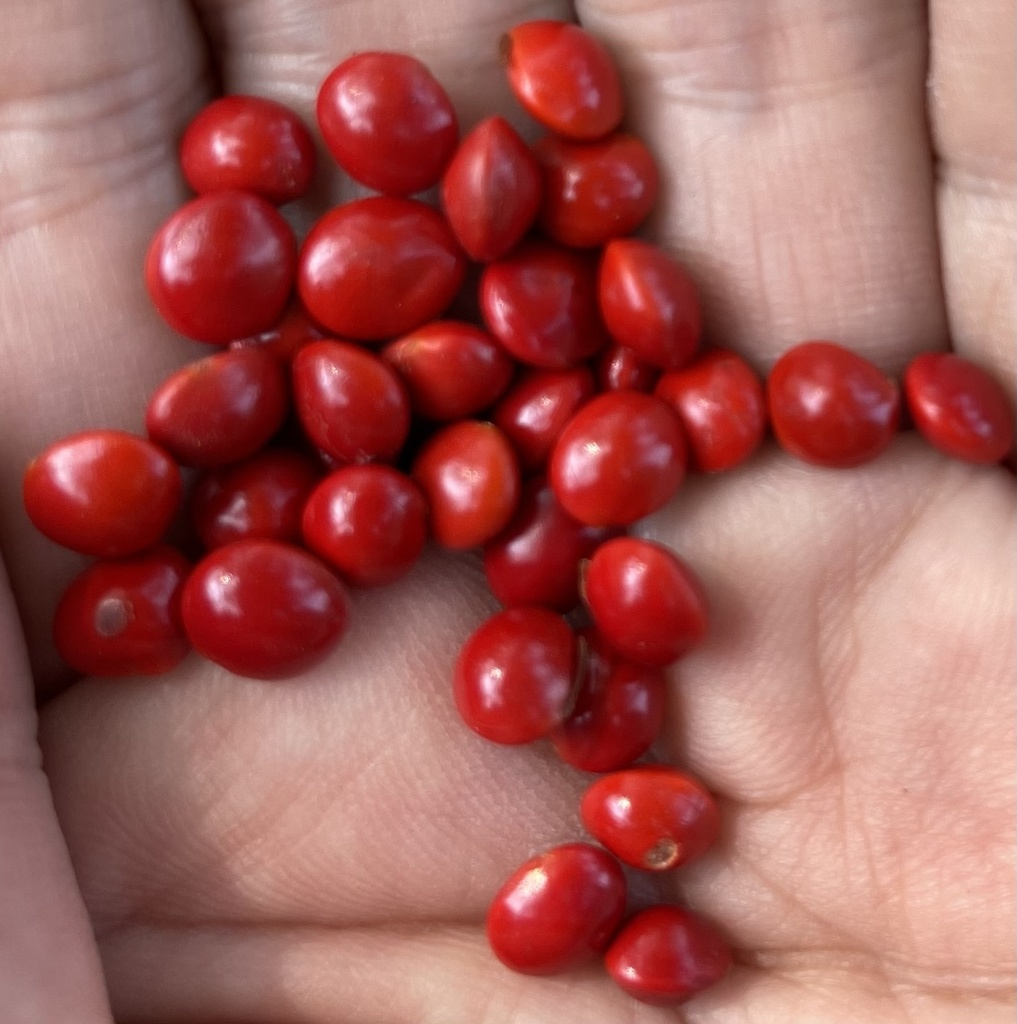

=== Life cycle ===
The species flowers from April to July, and fruits from July to October.

== Distribution and habitats ==
The species occurs in Southern China, including Hainan, Guangdong, Guangxi, Yunnan, Guizhou and Fujian; Taiwan and Southeast Asia, including Cambodia, Indonesia, Laos, Malaysia, Myanmar, and Vietnam.

== Uses ==
The species was identified as the best-performing species for direct seeding in forest restoration in northern Thailand. It showed the highest seed germination (about 85%), minimum seed predation, and the highest seedling establishment rate (about 66.7%) among the 23 species tested. Its seeds are orthodox and of moderate size, traits that contribute to successful germination and early seedling survival.
