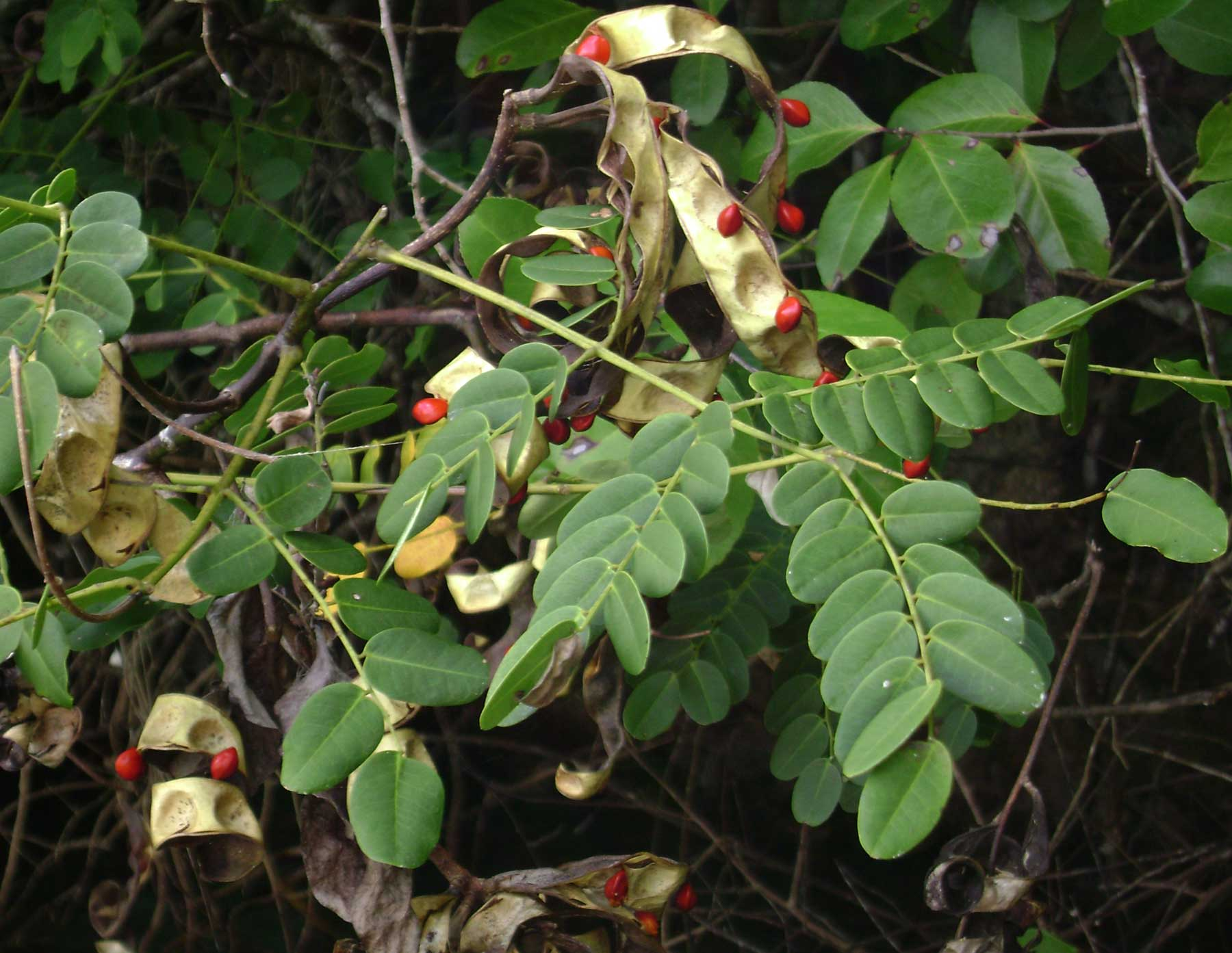

Scientific classification
- Kingdom: Plantae
- Clade: Tracheophytes
- Clade: Angiosperms
- Clade: Eudicots
- Clade: Rosids
- Order: Fabales
- Family: Fabaceae
- Subfamily: Caesalpinioideae
- Clade: Mimosoid clade
- Genus: Adenanthera; L. (1753)

Species
- See text

Synonyms
- Gonsii Adans. (1763)

= Adenanthera =

Genus of legumes

Adenanthera is a genus of flowering plants in the family Fabaceae.

According to Flora of Hong Kong (2008), the genus comprises ten species occurring in tropical Asia and the Pacific Islands, but only A. microsperma present in mainland China and Hong Kong.

== Species ==
As of March 2026, it contains the following 12 species:

- Adenanthera abrosperma F. Muell.
- Adenanthera aglaosperma Alston, syn. Adenanthera bicolor (Sri Lanka)
- Adenanthera borneensis Brace ex Prain
- Adenanthera forbesii Gagnep.
- Adenanthera intermedia Merr. (Philippines)
- Adenanthera kostermansii I.C. Nielsen
- Adenanthera malayana Kosterm.
- Adenanthera mantaroa Villiers
- Adenanthera marina I.C. Nielsen
- Adenanthera microsperma Teijsm. & Binn.
- Adenanthera novoguineensis Baker f.
- Adenanthera pavonina L. - Coralwood (India)

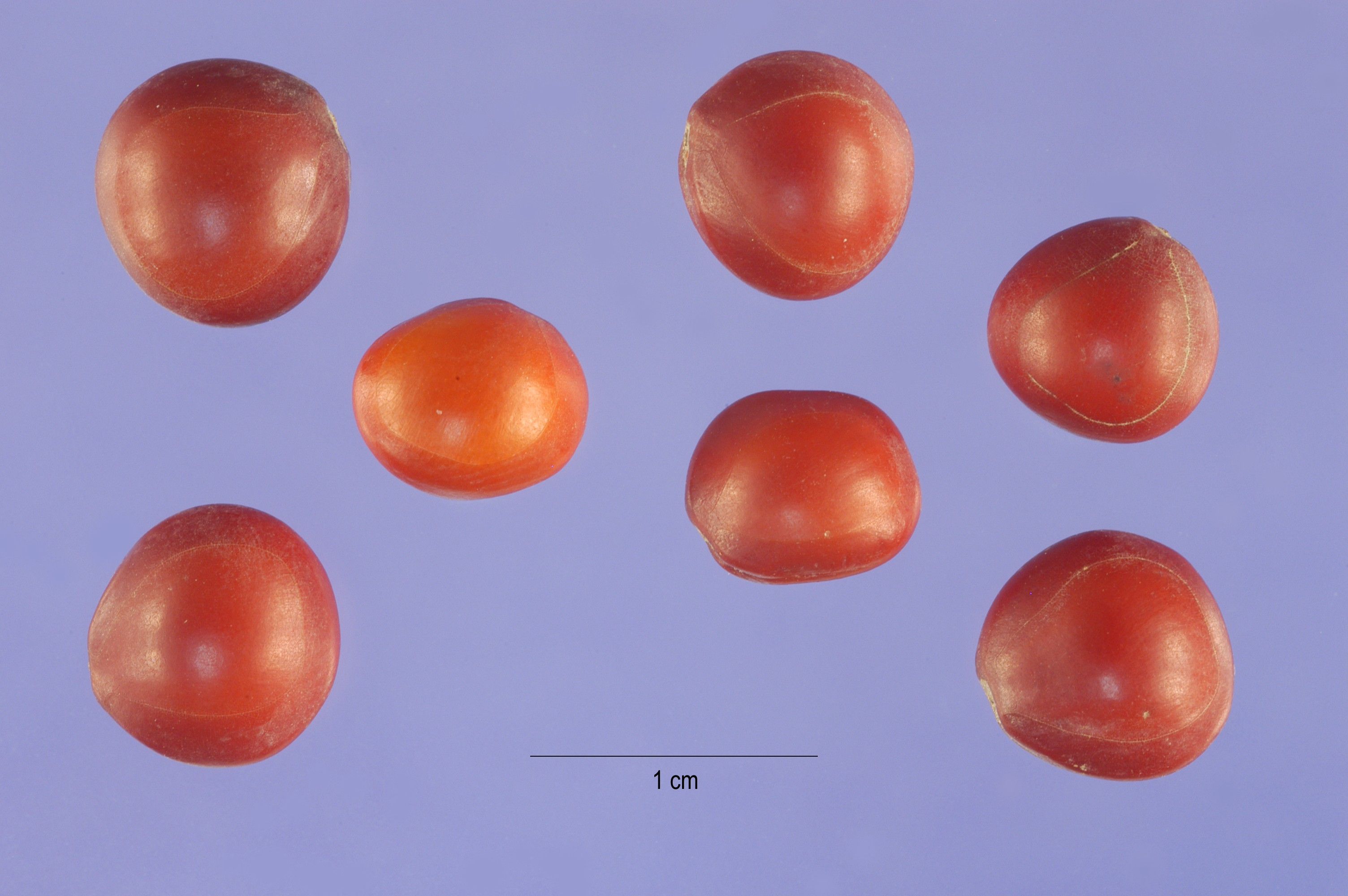
Seeds
