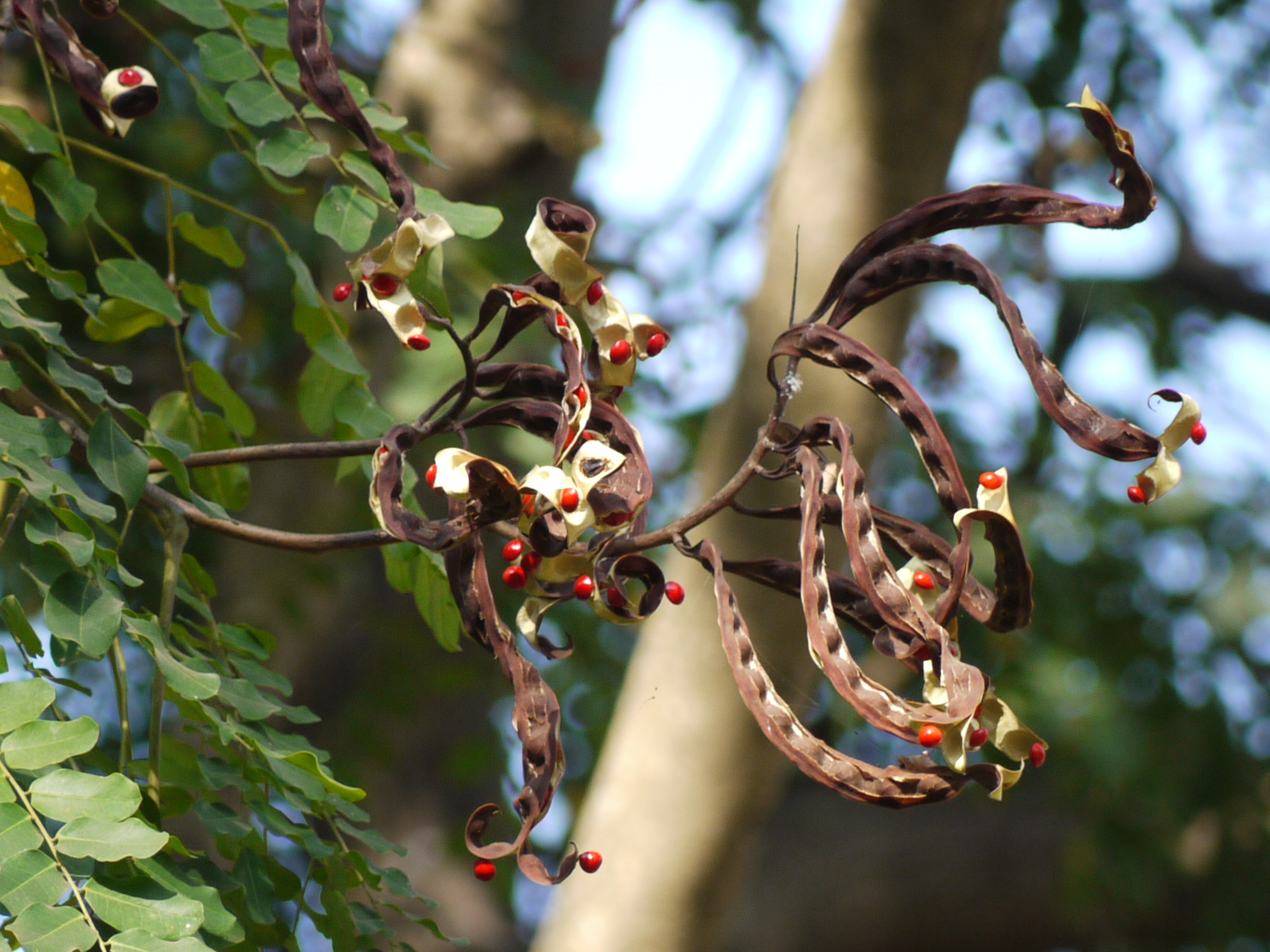
- Adenanthera pavonina foliage and fruit with red seeds, Pachu Bandar, Maharashtra, India

Conservation status
- Least Concern (IUCN 3.1)

Scientific classification
- Kingdom: Plantae
- Clade: Tracheophytes
- Clade: Angiosperms
- Clade: Eudicots
- Clade: Rosids
- Order: Fabales
- Family: Fabaceae
- Subfamily: Caesalpinioideae
- Clade: Mimosoid clade
- Genus: Adenanthera
- Species: A. pavonina

Binomial name
- Adenanthera pavonina L.

= Adenanthera pavonina =

Species of legume

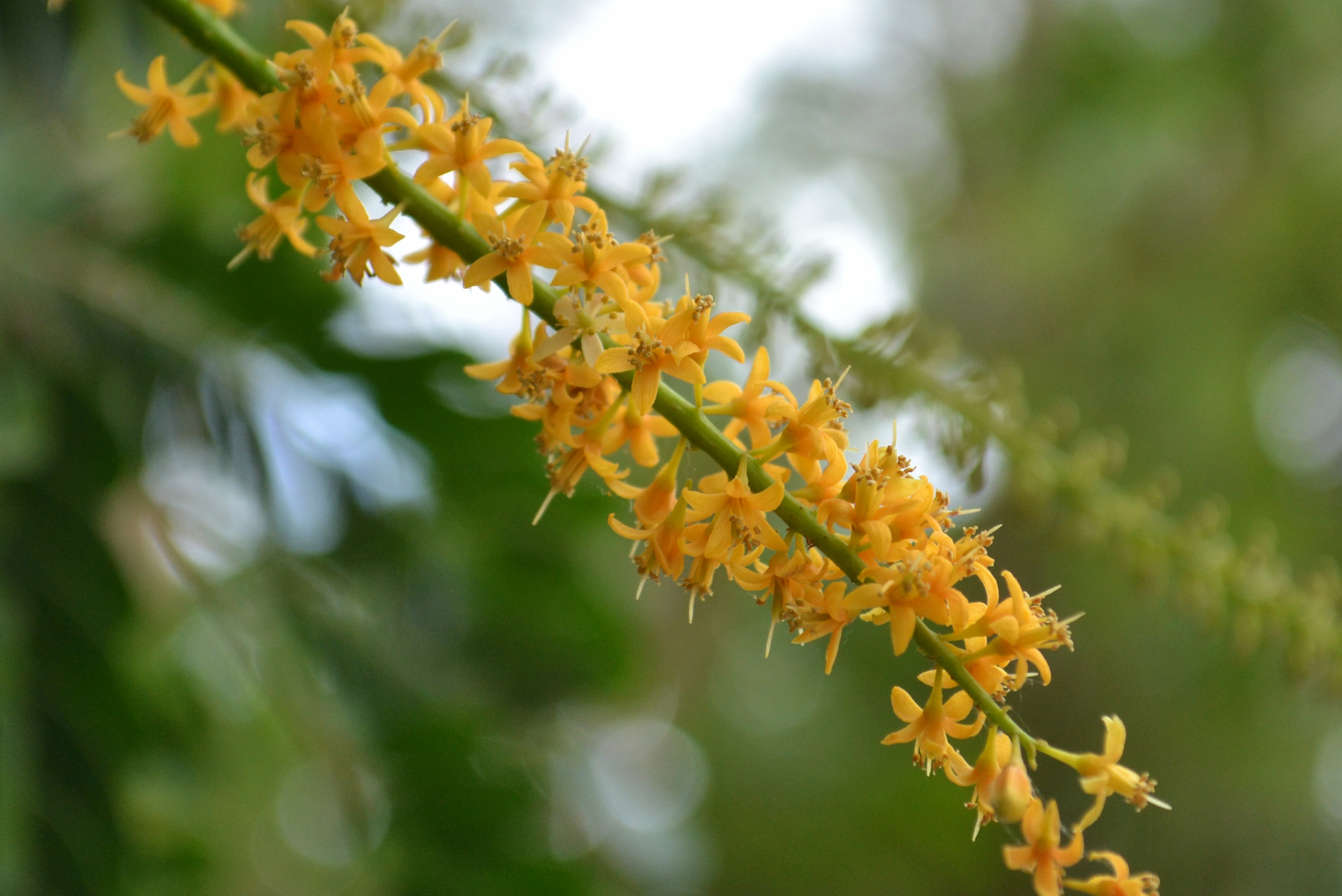
Flowers, Bengaluru, Karnataka

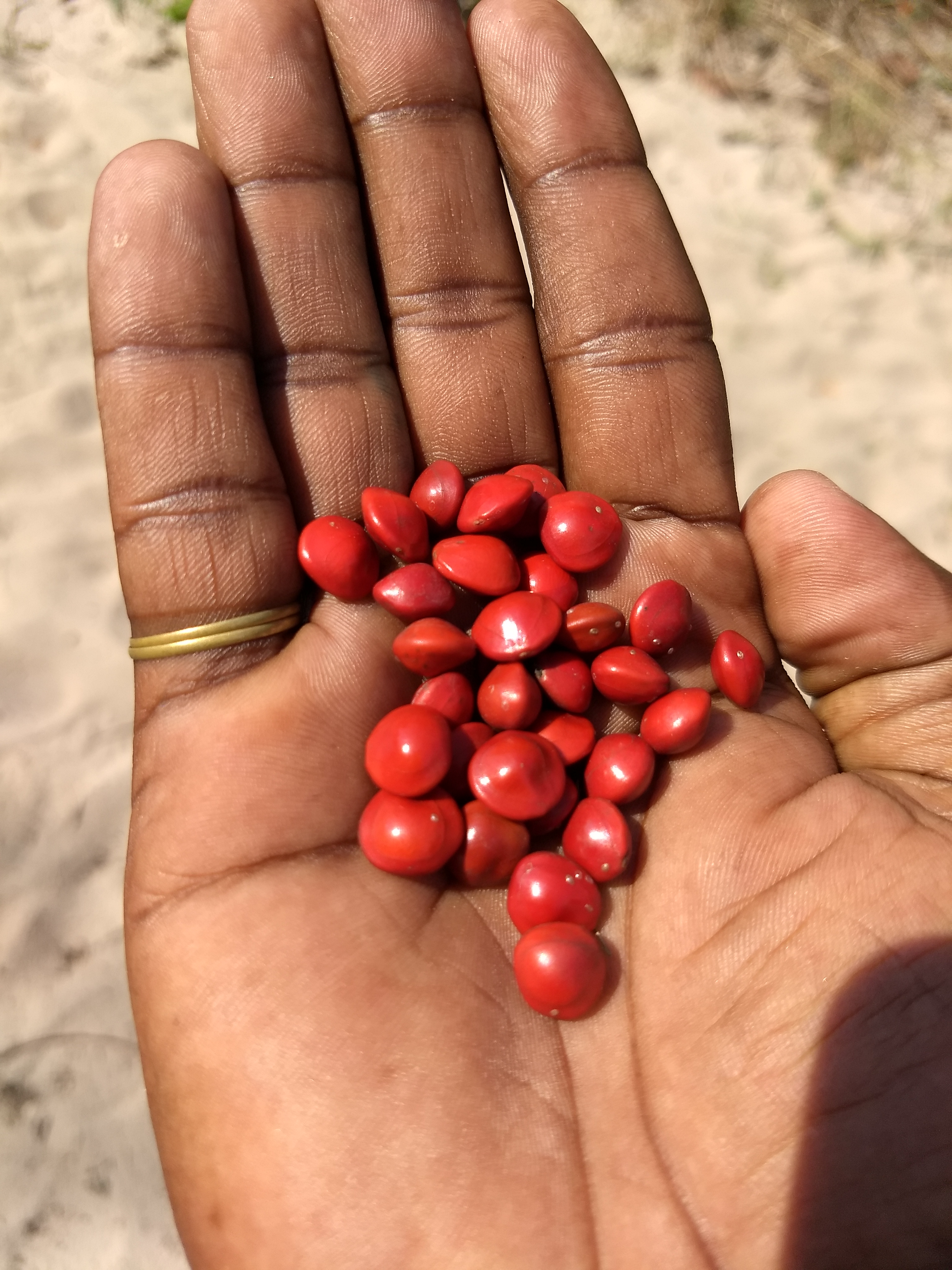
Seeds, at Cherthala, Kerala

Adenanthera pavonina (red sandalwood) is a species of leguminous tree native to southern Asia and northern Australasia. Its uses include food and drink, traditional medicine, and timber.

== Distribution ==
Its native range extends from India and Sri Lanka east throughout southern Asia to southernmost China (Hainan), Indonesia, and in Australasia in New Guinea, the Solomon Islands, and northern Australia in Northern Territory and Queensland. It has also been introduced widely within the tropics of the rest of the world, and is naturalised and sometimes invasive in the Philippines, Pakistan, and across much of tropical Africa and the tropical Americas.

== Description ==
Red sandalwood is a medium-sized tree growing to 15–18 m tall with a trunk up to 45 cm diameter. The leaves are bipinnate, up to 40 cm long, with (2–)3–5 pairs of pinnae, each pinna with 8-21 alternate leaflets; the leaflets are ovate-oblong, 2-4.3 cm long and 1 cm broad. The flowers are produced on slender racemes up to 30 cm long, each flower around 1 cm wide, with five small creamy white petals. The fruit is a curved pod up to 22 cm long and 2 cm broad, containing 8-12 hard, bright red pea-like seeds.

== Other common names ==
Other common names for Adenanthera pavonina include Acacia coral, arbre À Église, bead tree, Circassian seed, corail végétal, coral wood, madhoshi, moralitos, curly bean, deleite, Delicia, dilmawi, Graine-réglisse, jumbi-bead, l'Église, peronías, Peonía, Peonía extranjera, piriquiti, red bead tree, and réglisse. Barbados pride, peacock flower fence, sandalwood tree, saga, and manchadi are additional common names In Kerala where Adenanthera pavonina trees are abundant, the seeds are called Manjadi (മഞ്ചാടി).

== Uses ==
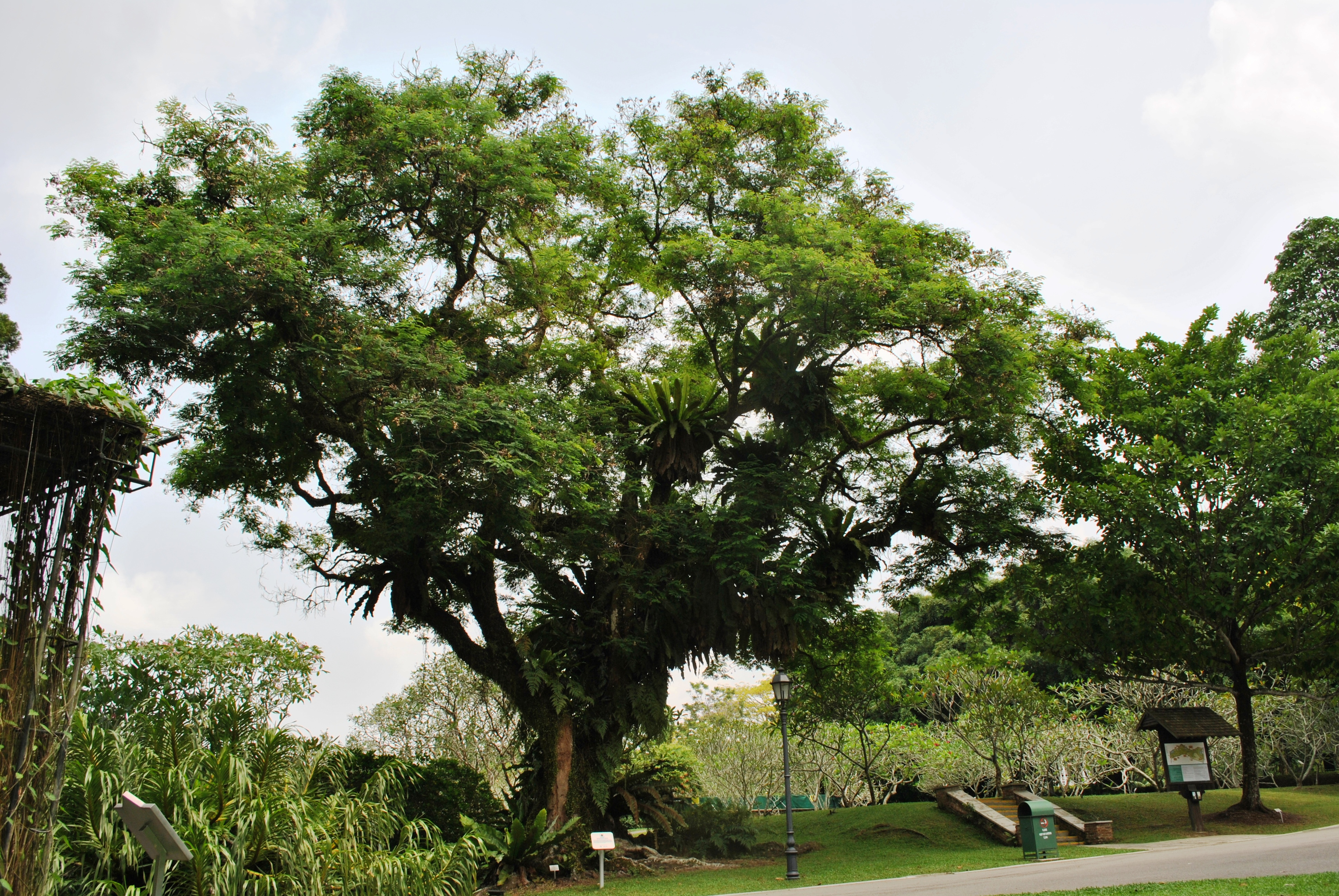
Heritage Tree, Saga (Adenanthera pavonina) in Singapore Botanical Gardens

This tree is useful for nitrogen fixation, and it is often cultivated for forage, as an ornamental garden plant or urban tree, and as a medicinal plant. For example, the young leaves can be cooked and eaten. The raw seeds are toxic, but may be eaten when cooked. In Singapore, the species forms part of the diet of local Raffles' banded langurs.

The botanist Edred Corner stated that the seeds have been used as units of weight for fine measures, of gold for instance, throughout recorded history because the seeds are known to be almost constant in weight. Indeed, the Malay name for the tree, saga, has been traced to the Arabic for 'goldsmith'. The seeds have long been a symbol of love in China, and its name in Chinese is xiang si dou (Chinese: 相思豆), or "mutual love bean". The beauty of the seeds has led to them being used as beads for jewellery. The small, yellowish flower grows in dense drooping rat-tail flower heads, almost like catkins. The curved hanging pods, with a bulge opposite each seed, split open into two twisted halves to reveal the hard, scarlet seeds. This tree is used for making soap, and a red dye can be obtained from the wood. The wood, which is extremely hard, is also used in boat-building, making furniture and for firewood.

The tree is fast-growing, with an attractive, spreading canopy that makes it suitable as a shade tree, and for ornamental purposes in large gardens or parks. However, it is also known for producing much litter in the form of leaves, twigs and especially seed pods which crack open while still on the branch, so releasing their seeds, before themselves falling to the ground.

In traditional medicine, a decoction of the young leaves and bark of Adenanthera pavonina is used to treat diarrhoea. Also, the ground seeds are used to treat inflammation. Preliminary scientific studies appear to support these traditional uses. In vitro studies show that Adenanthera pavonina leaf extract has antibacterial activity against the intestinal pathogen Campylobacter jejuni. Also, high doses of seed extract have an anti-inflammatory effect in studies in rats and mice.

== Chemical constituents ==
Adenanthera pavonina is a source of aliphatic natural products (O-acetylethanolamine and 1-octacosanol), carbohydrate (galactitol), simple aromatic natural products (2,4-dihydroxybenzoic acid), flavonoids (ampelopsin, butein, dihydrorobinetin, and robinetin), terpenoids (echinocystic acid and oleanolic acid), steroids (daucosterol, β-sitosterol, and stigmasterol), amino acids and peptides (2-amino-4-ethylidenepentanedioic acid and γ-methyleneglutamine), and alkaloids (O-acetylethanolamine and 1H-imidazole).
