= Hyun Jin-geon =

Korean author (1900–1943)

Hyeon Jin-geon
- Born: September 2, 1900; Daegu, Korean Empire
- Died: April 25, 1943 (aged 42)
- Writing career
- Language: Korean

- Hyun Jin-geon
- Hangul: 현진건
- Hanja: 玄鎭健
- RR: Hyeon Jingeon
- MR: Hyŏn Chin'gŏn

Hyeon Jingeon (Korean: 현진건; September 2, 1900 – April 25, 1943) was a Korean author.

== Life ==
Hyun Jin-geon was born in Daegu, Korean Empire in 1900 (two different birth dates are given in the literature, September 2 and August 9, the latter date according to the lunisolar calendar). His education was international: He attended Posung High School as well as high school in Tokyo and studied German at Shanghai Hogang University in China.

In China, Hyun and fellow Korean writers Lee Sangwha and Baek Giman published a literary magazine named Geohwa. His first work was published in 1920.

He began his career as a fiction writer with “Huisaenghwa”, published in Genesis (Gaebyeok) in November 1920. The work was not favorably received, but his subsequent works fared much better: he established his reputation as a major realist writer with “My Destitute Wife” (Bincheo) and “The Society that Drives You to Drink” (Sul gwonhaneun sahoe), both of which were published in 1921.

In 1922, with Park Jonghwa, Hong Sayong, Park Yeonghui, and Na Dohyang, Hyun helped found the literary journal White Tide (Baekjo). After six years in fiction he semi-changed careers and began a long career as journalist working for the Chosun Ilbo, Shidae Ilbo, and Dong-a Ilbo. In 1940 he returned to writing, serializing Heukchi Sangji- a novel about a Baekje general who fought against Tang invaders. This was deemed improper by Japanese censors and the work was never completed.

Hyun died on April 25, 1943.

== Work ==
Hyun devoted himself to creating realistic works. Beginning with One Lucky Day (Unsu joeun nal), he spurned the confessional mode of first-person narrative and instead wrote in the third person perspective in his attempt to portray life vividly and without subjectivity. Working in this manner he wrote some of his most popular works: Fire (Bul), Proctor B and Love Letter (B-sagamgwa leobeu leteo), and Hometown (Gohyang). In 1931, he published his final work of fiction, A Ham-Fisted Thief, and moved to writing long historical novels, including Equator (Jeokdo), The Shadowless Pagoda (Muyeong tap), and Heukchi Sangji.

== Works in translation ==
- Fire in Flowers of Fire
- One Lucky Day in A Washed-out Dream

== Works in Korean ==
=== Collections ===
- Korea's Faces (1926)
- The Corrupt (Tarakja)
- Overnight Fog (Jisaeneun angae)
- Faces of Joseon (Joseonui eolgol)
- Selected Stories of Hyeon Jin-geon (Hyeon Jin-geon danpyeonseon)

=== Travel Writing ===
- Dangun Pilgrimage (Dangun seongjeok sullye)

=== Historical Novels ===
- Equator (Jeokdo)
- The Shadowless Pagoda (Muyeongtap)
- Heukchisangji (1940)

== Episodes ==
- According to the meeting of the former Dong-A Ilbo editor-in-chief Wu Seung-Gyu, in a meeting outside Changuimun with comrades to collect a pension for flood damage in 1936, Hyun Jin-geon said "Don't lean on the Japanese, let us be self-sufficient." while vomiting, unfortunately, he received attention from the Japanese police next to him. (At the time, the Japanese forced the Koreans to call themselves 'my acquaintances' rather than calling themselves 'Japanese', and those who did not drove them to the so-called 'Futei Senjin'. That's why he publicly wrote 'my acquaintance' and wrote the two letters 'Japan' on top of it.)
