= List of awards and nominations received by Squid Game =

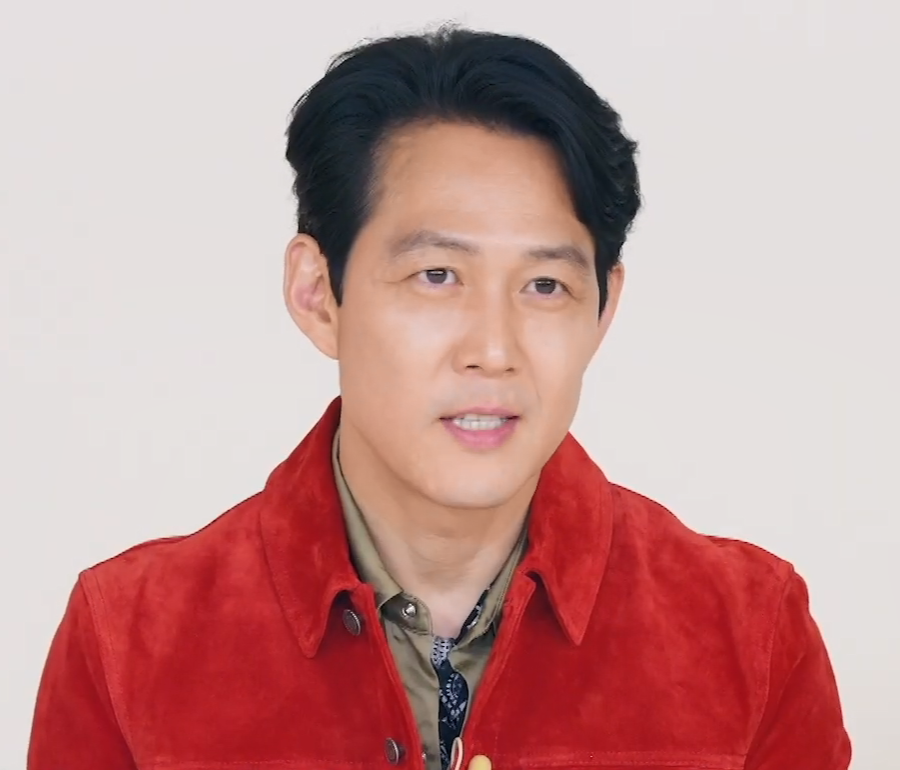
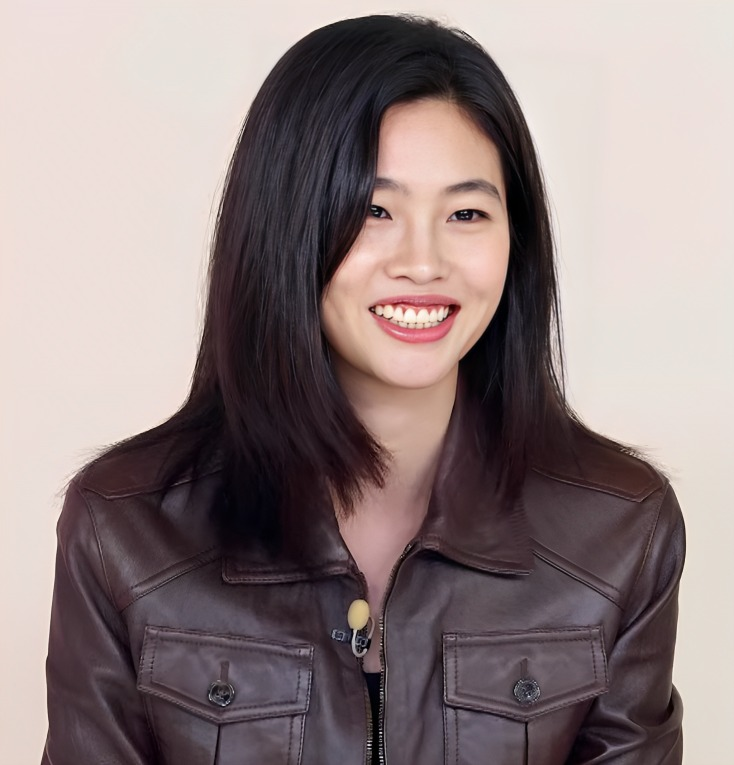
Lee Jung-jae (left) and HoYeon Jung (right) are the first actors of Asian as well as Korean descent to receive and win an individual SAG Award nomination

Squid Game is a South Korean streaming television series on Netflix created by Hwang Dong-hyuk. Its first season was released worldwide on September 17, 2021, followed by a second season on December 26, 2024 and a third, final season released on June 27th, 2025.

The series revolves around a secret contest where 456 players, all of whom are in deep financial hardship, risk their lives to play a series of deadly children's games for the chance to win a ₩45.6 billion prize (100 million per person killed). Due to the positive critical reception and general worldwide popularity of both seasons released thus far, the series has won and was nominated for numerous awards.

O Yeong-su's Golden Globe win made him the first Korean-born actor to win the award. The show's four SAG Award nominations also made history in it becoming the first non-English series and first Korean series to be nominated for Outstanding Performance by an Ensemble in a Drama Series. Individually, Lee Jung-jae became the first male actor from Asia and Korea to receive an individual SAG Award nomination for television and Jung Ho-yeon became the second actress of Asian as well as Korean descent to do the same. With both performers winning, the show made history in becoming the first non-English language television series to win at the SAG Awards.

Squid Game is also the first non-English television series to receive nominations and to win the Primetime Emmy Awards. It received 14 nominations, winning 6 of them, including Outstanding Lead Actor in a Drama Series, Outstanding Directing for a Drama Series, and Outstanding Guest Actress in a Drama Series. The winning of these awards respectively made actor Lee Jung-jae, director Hwang Dong-Hyuk, and actress Lee Yoo-mi to become the first Asians and Koreans to receive an Emmy.

== Awards and nominations ==
Award	Year	Category	Nominee(s)	Result	Ref.
AFI Awards	2021	Special Award	Squid Game	Won	
American Cinema Editors Awards	2022	Best Edited Drama Series	Nam Na-young (for "Gganbu")	Nominated	
APAN Star Awards	2022	Drama of the Year	Squid Game	Nominated	
APAN Star Awards	2022	Best Director	Hwang Dong-hyuk	Nominated	
APAN Star Awards	2022	Top Excellence Award, Actor in an OTT Drama	Lee Jung-jae	Nominated	
APAN Star Awards	2022	Excellence Award, Actor in an OTT Drama	Park Hae-soo	Nominated	
APAN Star Awards	2022	Excellence Award, Actor in an OTT Drama	O Yeong-su	Nominated	
APAN Star Awards	2022	Excellence Award, Actress in an OTT Drama	Lee Yoo-mi	Nominated	
APAN Star Awards	2022	Best Supporting Actor	Heo Sung-tae	Won	
APAN Star Awards	2022	Best New Actress	Jung Ho-yeon	Nominated	
APAN Star Awards	2022	Popularity Star Award, Actress	Jung Ho-yeon	Nominated	
Art Directors Guild Awards	2021	Excellence in Production Design for a One-Hour Contemporary Single-Camera Series	Chae Kyoung-sun (for "Gganbu")	Won	
Art Directors Guild Awards	2025	Excellence in Production Design for a One-Hour Contemporary Single-Camera Series	Chae Kyoung-sun (for "Six Legs" and "O X")	Won	
Art Directors Guild Awards	2026	Excellence in Production Design for a Variety or Reality Series	Squid Game: The Challenge: "Catch" – Mathieu Weekes and Ben Norman	Nominated	
Asia Artist Awards	2021	Actor of the Year	Lee Jung-jae	Won	
Asia Artist Awards	2021	Hot Trend Award	Lee Jung-jae	Won	
Asia Artist Awards	2021	Fabulous Award	Lee Jung-jae	Won	
Asia Artist Awards	2021	Best Actor Award	Heo Sung-tae	Won	
Asia Artist Awards	2021	Best Actor Award	Kim Joo-ryoung	Won	
Astra TV Awards	2026	Reality Competition Series	Squid Game: The Challenge	Nominated	
Baeksang Arts Awards	2022	Grand Prize – Television	Squid Game	Won	
Baeksang Arts Awards	2022	Best Drama	Squid Game	Nominated	
Baeksang Arts Awards	2022	Best Director	Hwang Dong-hyuk	Won	
Baeksang Arts Awards	2022	Best Actor	Lee Jung-jae	Nominated	
Baeksang Arts Awards	2022	Best Supporting Actor	Heo Sung-tae	Nominated	
Baeksang Arts Awards	2022	Best Supporting Actress	Kim Joo-ryoung	Nominated	
Baeksang Arts Awards	2022	Best New Actress	Jung Ho-yeon	Nominated	
Baeksang Arts Awards	2022	Best Screenplay	Hwang Dong-hyuk	Nominated	
Baeksang Arts Awards	2022	Baeksang Arts Technical Award (Art direction)	Chae Kyung-sun	Nominated	
Baeksang Arts Awards	2022	Baeksang Arts Technical Award (Music)	Jung Jae-il	Won	
Baeksang Arts Awards	2025	Best Supporting Actor	Roh Jae-won	Nominated	
Blue Dragon Series Awards	2022	Best Drama	Squid Game	Nominated	
Blue Dragon Series Awards	2022	Best Actor	Lee Jung-jae	Won	
Blue Dragon Series Awards	2022	Best Supporting Actor	Park Hae-soo	Nominated	
Blue Dragon Series Awards	2022	Best Supporting Actress	Kim Joo-ryoung	Nominated	
Blue Dragon Series Awards	2022	Best New Actress	HoYeon Jung	Won	
British Academy Television Awards	2022	Best International Programme	Squid Game	Nominated	
British Academy Television Awards	2022	Virgin TV's Must-See Moment	"Red Light, Green Light"	Nominated	
British Academy Television Awards	2026	Best Reality	Squid Game: The Challenge	Nominated	
British Academy Television Craft Awards	2026	Best Entertainment Craft Team	Squid Game: The Challenge	Nominated	
Bucheon International Fantastic Film Festival	2022	Series Film Award	Squid Game	Won	
Cinema Audio Society Awards	2021	Outstanding Achievement in Sound Mixing for Television Series – One Hour	Park Hyeon-Soo, Serge Perron, Cameron Sloan (for "VIPS")	Nominated	
Costume Designers Guild Awards	2021	Excellence in Contemporary Television	Jo Sang-gyeong(for "VIPS")	Nominated	
Critics' Choice Awards	2021	Best Drama Series	Squid Game	Nominated	
Critics' Choice Awards	2021	Best Actor in a Drama Series	Lee Jung-jae	Won	
Critics' Choice Awards	2021	Best Foreign Language Series	Squid Game	Won	
Critics' Choice Awards	2025	Best Foreign Language Series	Squid Game	Won	
Critics' Choice Awards	2026	Best Foreign Language Series	Squid Game	Won	
Critics' Choice Real TV Awards	2026	Best Competition Series	Squid Game: The Challenge	Nominated	
Critics' Choice Super Awards	2022	Best Action Series	Squid Game	Won	
Critics' Choice Super Awards	2022	Best Actor in an Action Series	Lee Jung-jae	Won	
Critics' Choice Super Awards	2022	Best Actress in an Action Series	HoYeon Jung	Won	
Critics' Choice Super Awards	2022	Best Actress in an Action Series	Kim Joo-ryoung	Nominated	
Director's Cut Awards	2026	Best Director (Series)	Squid Game S3 : Hwang Dong-hyuk	Nominated	
Dorian TV Awards	2025	Best Non-English Language TV Show	Squid Game	Won	
Dorian TV Awards	2026	Best Non-English Language TV Show	Squid Game	Won	
Gold List TV	2025	Outstanding Series	Squid Game	Won	
Gold List TV	2025	Outstanding Lead Performance	Lee Jung-jae	Won	
Gold List TV	2025	Outstanding Directing	Hwang Dong-hyuk	Won	
Golden Globe Awards	2021	Best Television Series – Drama	Squid Game	Nominated	
Golden Globe Awards	2021	Best Actor in a Television Series – Drama	Lee Jung-jae	Nominated	
Golden Globe Awards	2021	Best Supporting Actor – Television	O Yeong-su	Won	
Golden Globe Awards	2025	Best Television Series – Drama	Squid Game	Nominated	
Gold Derby TV Awards	2025	Ensemble of the Year	Squid Game	Won	
Gold Derby TV Awards	2025	Drama Series	Squid Game	Won	
Gold Derby TV Awards	2025	Drama Actor	Lee Jung-jae	Won	
Gold Derby TV Awards	2025	Drama Supporting Actress	Kang Ae-sim	Won	
Gold Derby TV Awards	2025	Drama Supporting Actress	Park Gyu-young	Nominated	
Gold Derby TV Awards	2025	Drama Supporting Actor	Lee Byung-hun	Nominated	
Gold Derby TV Awards	2025	Drama Supporting Actor	Choi Seung-hyun	Won	
Gold Derby TV Awards	2025	Drama Guest Actor	Gong Yoo	Won	
Golden Reel Awards	2021	Outstanding Achievement in Sound Editing – Series 1 Hour – Comedy or Drama – Dialogue and ADR	Hye-Young Kang, Tae-Young Choi, Byung-In Kim, Eun-Ji Ye (for "VIPS")	Nominated	
Golden Reel Awards	2021	Outstanding Achievement in Sound Editing – Series 1 Hour – Comedy or Drama – Sound Effects and Foley	Hye-Young Kang, Ye-Jin Jo, Hye-Jin Yang, Taek-Hyun Hong, Chung-Gyu Lee (for "VIPS")	Nominated	
Golden Reel Awards	2021	Outstanding Achievement in Sound Editing – Series 1 Hour – Comedy or Drama – Music	Jae-il Jung (for "Red Light, Green Light")	Nominated	
Golden Trailer Awards	2026	Best Foreign (Trailer/Teaser) – TV/Streaming Series	Squid Game S3: Trailer, “Faith”, Netflix, RAVE Collective	Nominated	
Golden Trailer Awards	2026	Best Original Score (Trailer/Teaser) – TV/Streaming Series	Squid Game S3: Special Teaser, “Goodbye Squid Game”, Netflix, RAVE Collective	Nominated	
Golden Trailer Awards	2026	Best Horror/Thriller Poster (for a TV/streaming series)	Squid Game S3, Coffin Teaser, Netflix, The Refinery	Won	
Gotham Awards	2021	Breakthrough Series – Long Form	Kim Ji-yeon and Hwang Dong-hyuk	Won	
Gotham Awards	2021	Outstanding Performance in a New Series	Lee Jung-jae	Nominated	
Hollywood Critics Association TV Awards	2022	Best Streaming Series, Drama	Squid Game	Nominated	
Hollywood Critics Association TV Awards	2022	Best International Series	Squid Game	Won	
Hollywood Critics Association TV Awards	2022	Best Actor in a Streaming Series, Drama	Lee Jung-jae	Won	
Hollywood Critics Association TV Awards	2022	Best Supporting Actor in a Streaming Series, Drama	Park Hae-soo	Nominated	
Hollywood Critics Association TV Awards	2022	Best Supporting Actress in a Streaming Series, Drama	HoYeon Jung	Nominated	
Hollywood Critics Association TV Awards	2022	Best Directing in a Streaming Series, Drama	Hwang Dong-hyuk (for "Red Light, Green Light")	Nominated	
Hollywood Critics Association TV Awards	2022	Best Writing in a Streaming Series, Drama	Hwang Dong-hyuk (for "One Lucky Day")	Nominated	
Hollywood Music in Media Awards	2021	Score - TV Show/Limited Series	Jung Jae-il	Won	
Independent Spirit Awards	2022	Best Male Performance in a New Scripted Series	Lee Jung-jae	Won	
Korea Drama Awards	2025	Top Excellence Award, Actor	Kang Ha-neul	Nominated	
Korea First Brand Awards	2026	K-Culture Icon	Squid Game	Won	
MTV Movie & TV Awards	2022	Best Show	Squid Game	Nominated	
MTV Movie & TV Awards	2022	Best Breakthrough Performance	Jung Ho-yeon	Nominated	
People's Choice Awards	2021	Bingeworthy Show of the Year	Squid Game	Won	
Primetime Emmy Awards	2022	Outstanding Drama Series	Kim Ji-yeon and Hwang Dong-hyuk	Nominated	
Primetime Emmy Awards	2022	Outstanding Lead Actor in a Drama Series	Lee Jung-jae (for "Gganbu")	Won	
Primetime Emmy Awards	2022	Outstanding Supporting Actor in a Drama Series	Park Hae-soo (for "One Lucky Day")	Nominated	
Primetime Emmy Awards	2022	Outstanding Supporting Actor in a Drama Series	Oh Yeong-su (for "Gganbu")	Nominated	
Primetime Emmy Awards	2022	Outstanding Supporting Actress in a Drama Series	Jung Ho-yeon (for "Gganbu")	Nominated	
Primetime Emmy Awards	2022	Outstanding Directing for a Drama Series	Hwang Dong-hyuk (for "Red Light, Green Light")	Won	
Primetime Emmy Awards	2022	Outstanding Writing for a Drama Series	Hwang Dong-hyuk (for "One Lucky Day")	Nominated	
Primetime Creative Arts Emmy Awards	2022	Outstanding Guest Actress in a Drama Series	Lee Yoo-mi (for "Gganbu")	Won	
Primetime Creative Arts Emmy Awards	2022	Outstanding Production Design for a Narrative Contemporary Program (One Hour or More)	Chae Kyoung-sun, Gim En-jee and Kim Jeong-gun (for "Gganbu")	Won	
Primetime Creative Arts Emmy Awards	2022	Outstanding Cinematography For A Single-Camera Series (One Hour)	Lee Hyung-deok (for "Stick to the Team")	Nominated	
Primetime Creative Arts Emmy Awards	2022	Outstanding Single-Camera Picture Editing for a Drama Series	Nam Na-young (for "Gganbu")	Nominated	
Primetime Creative Arts Emmy Awards	2022	Outstanding Original Main Title Theme Music	Jung Jae-il	Nominated	
Primetime Creative Arts Emmy Awards	2022	Outstanding Special Visual Effects in a Single Episode	Cheong Jai-hoon, Kang Moon-jung, Kim Hye-jin, Jo Hyun-jin, Kim Seong-chul, Lee Jae-bum, Shin Min-soo, Seok Jong-yeon and Jun Sung-man (for "VIPS")	Won	
Primetime Creative Arts Emmy Awards	2022	Outstanding Stunt Performance	Lim Tae-hoon, Shim Sang-min, Kim Cha-i and Lee Tae-young (for "Stick to the Team")	Won	
Producers Guild of America Awards	2021	Outstanding Producer of Episodic Television – Drama	Squid Game	Nominated	
Rose d'Or	2021	Drama Program	Squid Game	Nominated	
Satellite Awards	2025	Best Drama Series	Squid Game	Nominated	
Saturn Awards	2022	Best Streaming Horror/Thriller Television Series	Squid Game	Nominated	
Saturn Awards	2026	Best Action / Adventure Television Series	Squid Game	Nominated	
Screen Actors Guild Awards	2021	Outstanding Performance by an Ensemble in a Drama Series	Lee Jung-jae, Park Hae-soo, Wi Ha-joon, Hoyeon Jung, Anupam Tripathi, Heo Sung-tae, O Yeong-su, and Kim Joo-ryoung	Nominated	
Screen Actors Guild Awards	2021	Outstanding Performance by a Male Actor in a Drama Series	Lee Jung-jae	Won	
Screen Actors Guild Awards	2021	Outstanding Performance by a Female Actor in a Drama Series	Jung Ho-yeon	Won	
Screen Actors Guild Awards	2021	Outstanding Performance by a Stunt Ensemble in a Television Series	Squid Game	Won	
Screen Actors Guild Awards	2026	Outstanding Performance by a Stunt Ensemble in a Television Series	Squid Game	Nominated	
Television Critics Association Awards	2022	Program of the Year	Squid Game	Nominated	
Television Critics Association Awards	2022	Outstanding Achievement in Drama	Squid Game	Nominated	
Television Critics Association Awards	2022	Individual Achievement in Drama	Lee Jung-jae	Nominated	
Television Critics Association Awards	2026	Outstanding International Series – New Category	Squid Game	Won	
Visual Effects Society Awards	2022	Outstanding Supporting Visual Effects in a Photoreal Episode	Jaihoon Jung, Hyejin Kim, Hyungrok Kim, Sungman Jun (for "VIPS")	Nominated	
