= One Lucky Day =

Korean-language short story

- Author: Hyun Jin-geon
- Language: Korean
- Genre: realistic fiction
- Publication date: 1924

One Lucky Day (Korean: 운수 좋은 날) is a 1924 realistic novel written by Hyun Jin-geon, first published by Gaebyeok. One rainy day, "good luck" comes to the old rickshaw-porter Kim, who has not seen money for ten days because of bad luck. He is able to get two customers and earn 80 jeon in the morning alone. While going back home, he is glad that he could buy the seolleongtang that his severely ill wife wanted so much. More good luck strikes when he finds a student who pays 1 won and 50 jeon for a ride.

As he is pulling the rickshaw in high spirits because of his good luck, he remembers that his wife had said, "Please do not go out today," and his mood is dampened. Nevertheless, after making another round of negotiations with his customers and earning money, he visits a roadside bar to celebrate his unexpected earnings.

As he gets drunk in the lively atmosphere of a warm bar, old Kim tries not to have ominous thoughts about his wife, throwing away the "resentful money" and crying and laughing like crazy.

At last, when a heavily drunk old Kim returns home after buying the seolleongtang for his wife, he finds her already dead; his baby, who was sucking the mother's nipple, was waiting for him. Old Kim's seemingly fortunate day ends with him crying alone.

== Setting ==
“One Lucky Day” is a novel published in 1924, which is set in Seoul during the Japanese forced occupation of Korea. Both the lives of people living in Seoul and the appearance of Seoul itself at that time can both be found inside the novel.

During the 1920s Seoul was starting to turn into a modern city. Modern factories, schools, and hospitals were starting to be built. This is noticeable in One Lucky Day, as the rickshaw that Kim is driving was a popular form of transportation, because the citizens of Seoul during the 1920s needed an easy-to-use transportation due to their busy everyday life. The fact that there were already train rails and stations, and the fact that there were modern schools and hospitals is also written inside the novel.

However, while the settings of One Lucky Day was Seoul, a modern city, Hyun Jin-geon focuses on the daily life of lower class citizens in the story, and how harsh it was. In the story, Kim conflicts between earning money to sustain life and looking after his dying wife. This shows the pitiful life of lower class citizens during the Japanese forced occupation, who couldn't do much and had to go out and earn money, even when their wife was dying.

The setting of One Lucky Day, Seoul, was already starting to become a modern city during the 1920s. However, there were still a lot of people working hard to survive day by day. Seoul was full of lower class citizens who were tormented by poverty, and this poverty is the problem that Hyun Jin-geon, along with other realism authors at that time, tried to point out with the settings of their stories.

== Literacy significance and criticism ==
This novel is a work that is very precisely structured toward a single focus, in which its tragic effects are revealed by irony.

The background of rain is set very methodically. The image of the uncontrollable winter rain that is constantly reminded is not only a functional background to illustrate the death of his wife, but also symbolizes the gloomy environment in which Kim is located. It represents the poor life of the lower classes in the colonial city.

This shows that the author is not idealizing reality, but is rather grasping its true form. In the end, Kim is not a special individual, but a representative of the suffering colonial people. The creation of a personality typology such as Kim was also in the context of the rise of the sympathetic literature (New Trends Literature), which mainly dealt with the lives of the people in the mid-1920s.

Paying attention to the literary transformation of the author, this work was the starting point of clearing out his early autobiographical novels centered on the intellectuals, facing the reality of the colonialism and pursuing the destiny of the populace, the greatest victim of colonialism. Above all, this work has the most appropriate combination of social consciousness and ironic short - form style out of all the novels written by Hyun Jin-geon.

== In popular culture ==
The ninth and final episode of the first season of the Netflix series Squid Game (2021–present) was titled "One Lucky Day" as a reference to the novel.
