= Squid Game =

South Korean television series (2021–2025)

- Hangul: 오징어 게임
- RR: Ojingeo geim
- MR: Ojingŏ keim
- Genre: Dystopian; Survival; Thriller; Drama
- Created by: Hwang Dong-hyuk
- Written by: Hwang Dong-hyuk
- Directed by: Hwang Dong-hyuk
- Starring: Lee Jung-jae; Lee Byung-hun; Wi Ha-joon
- Music by: Jung Jae-il
- Country of origin: South Korea
- Original language: Korean
- No. of seasons: 3
- No. of episodes: 22

Production
- Executive producers: Kim Ji-yeon; Hwang Dong-hyuk
- Producers: Han Heung-seok; Kim Ji-eun (season 2)
- Cinematography: Lee Hyung-deok (season 1); Kim Ji-yong (season 2)
- Editor: Nam Na-yeong
- Camera setup: Multi-camera
- Running time: 33–76 minutes
- Production company: Siren Pictures Inc.
- Budget: US$21.4 million (season 1); ₩100 billion (US$68.9 million) (seasons 2–3)

Original release
- Network: Netflix
- Release: September 17, 2021 – June 27, 2025

Related
- Squid Game: The Challenge

Squid Game (Korean: 오징어 게임; RR: Ojingeo geim) is a South Korean dystopian survival thriller drama television series created, written, and directed by Hwang Dong-hyuk for Netflix. The series depicts a secret contest where 456 players, all of whom are in deep financial hardship, risk their lives to play a series of children's games that result in death if eliminated, for the chance to win a ₩45.6 billion (US$34.02 million) prize. The series' title draws from ojingeo ("squid"), a Korean children's game. Lee Jung-jae, who portrays series protagonist Seong Gi-hun, leads an ensemble cast.

Hwang conceived Squid Game based on his own economic struggles, as well as the class disparity in South Korea and capitalism. Although he outlined the story in 2009, Hwang could not find a production company to fund the idea until Netflix took an interest around 2019 as part of a drive to expand its foreign programming offerings. He wrote and directed all episodes of the series.

The first season of Squid Game was released worldwide on September 17, 2021, to critical acclaim and international attention. It became Netflix's most-watched series and received numerous accolades, including six Primetime Emmy Awards and one Golden Globe. The second season was released on December 26, 2024, followed by the third and final season on June 27, 2025. The final two seasons, filmed back-to-back, were met with generally positive reviews from critics but were considered inferior to the first season. Squid Game has become one of Netflix's flagship series.

== Plot ==
In South Korea, Seong Gi-hun, a divorced father and indebted gambling addict who lives with his elderly mother, is invited to play a series of children's games for a chance at a large cash prize. Accepting the offer, he is taken to an unknown, remote island where he finds himself among 455 other players who are all in deep financial trouble. The players are made to wear green tracksuits, with their personal belongings confiscated, and are kept under watch at all times by masked guards in pink jumpsuits, with the games overseen by the Front Man, who wears a black mask and black uniform. The players soon discover that losing a game results in their deaths, with each death contributing ₩100 million (US$74,600) to the prize pool, which can reach a total of ₩45.6 billion (US$34.02 million). (Note: At the time of broadcast, ₩45.6 billion was approximately US$38 million or €33 million.) (Note: In an interview with Vanity Fair, Hwang revealed the original number of participants for the game in the original script was around 1000, but he later reduced the numbers due to budget issues. The amount of total prize money for the show was set similar to the largest amount of prize money ever given for lotteries in South Korea. Gi-hun was allocated the last number, 456, to reflect his social status in the show.) Gi-hun allies with other players, including his childhood friend Cho Sang-woo and North Korean defector Kang Sae-byeok, to try to survive the games' physical and psychological twists, while detective Hwang Jun-ho infiltrates the games as one of the guards to find his missing brother.

In the second season, Gi-hun, who had vowed revenge three years after winning the game, participates in it again to take revenge on the Front Man and end the game for good, and is joined by police detective Jun-ho, the Front Man's brother. After assuming full control of the game following its creator's death, the Front Man attempts to make Gi-hun see that there is no way he can end the games due to the true nature of people. Gi-hun starts to play the next Squid Game. Gi-hun allies with other players, including his best friend Park Jung-bae and a pregnant girl, Kim Jun-hee, to try to survive the games' physical and psychological twists. At the same time, Jun-ho and Choi Woo-seok search for the island where the games are held, while young mother and North Korean defector Kang No-eul is recruited to guard the players.

In the third and final season, Gi-hun and the players fight for survival in ever-deadlier games, which have dire consequences. In-ho welcomes the VIPs while his brother Jun-ho continues the search for the island, unaware of a traitor in their midst.

== Cast and characters ==
Cast

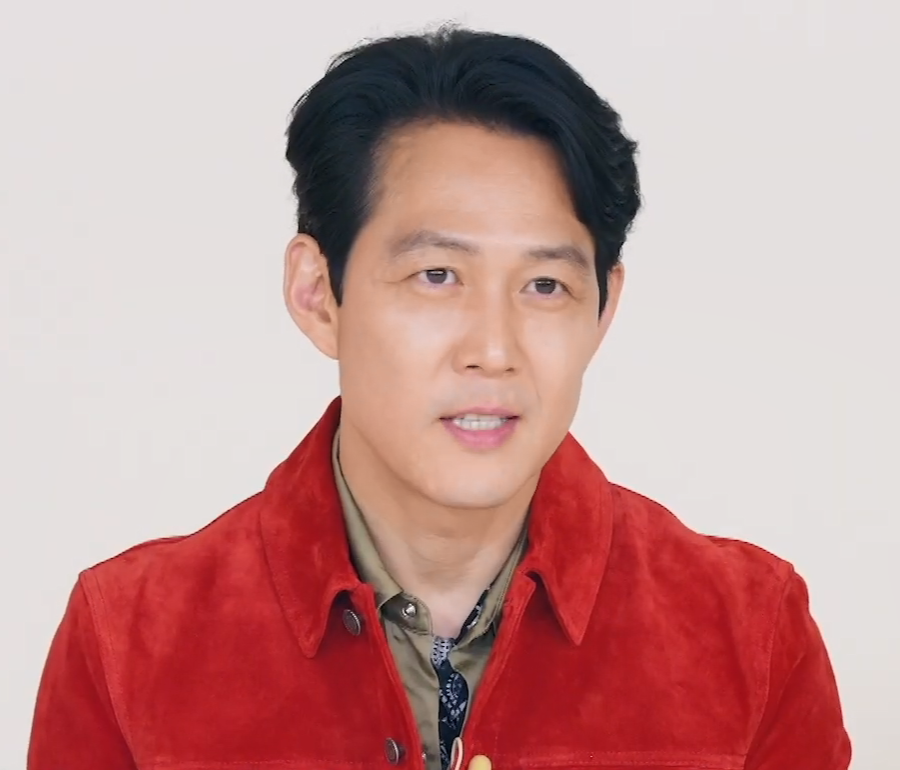
Lee Jung-jae (Seong Gi-hun, Player 456)

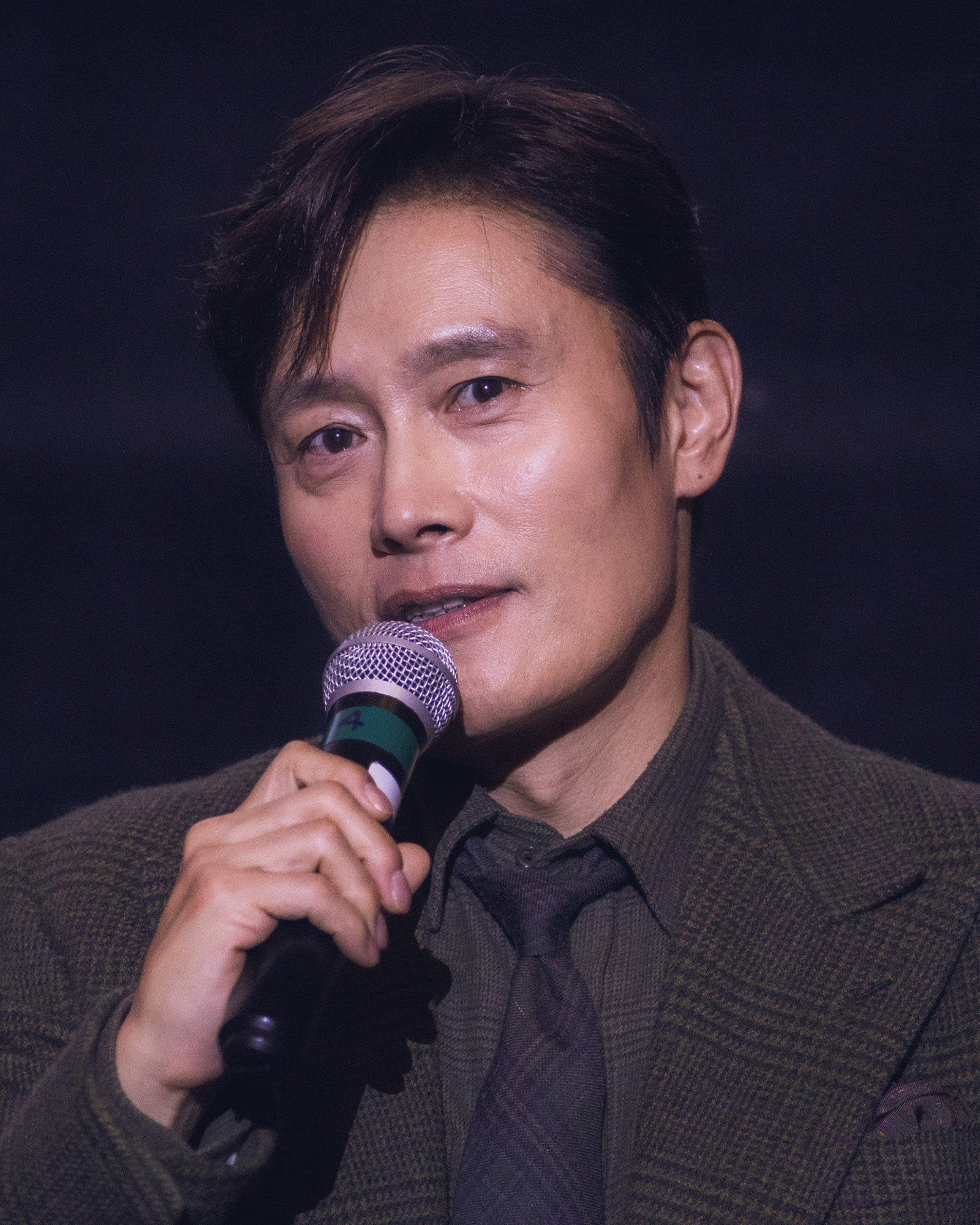
Lee Byung-hun (Hwang In-ho, the Front Man)

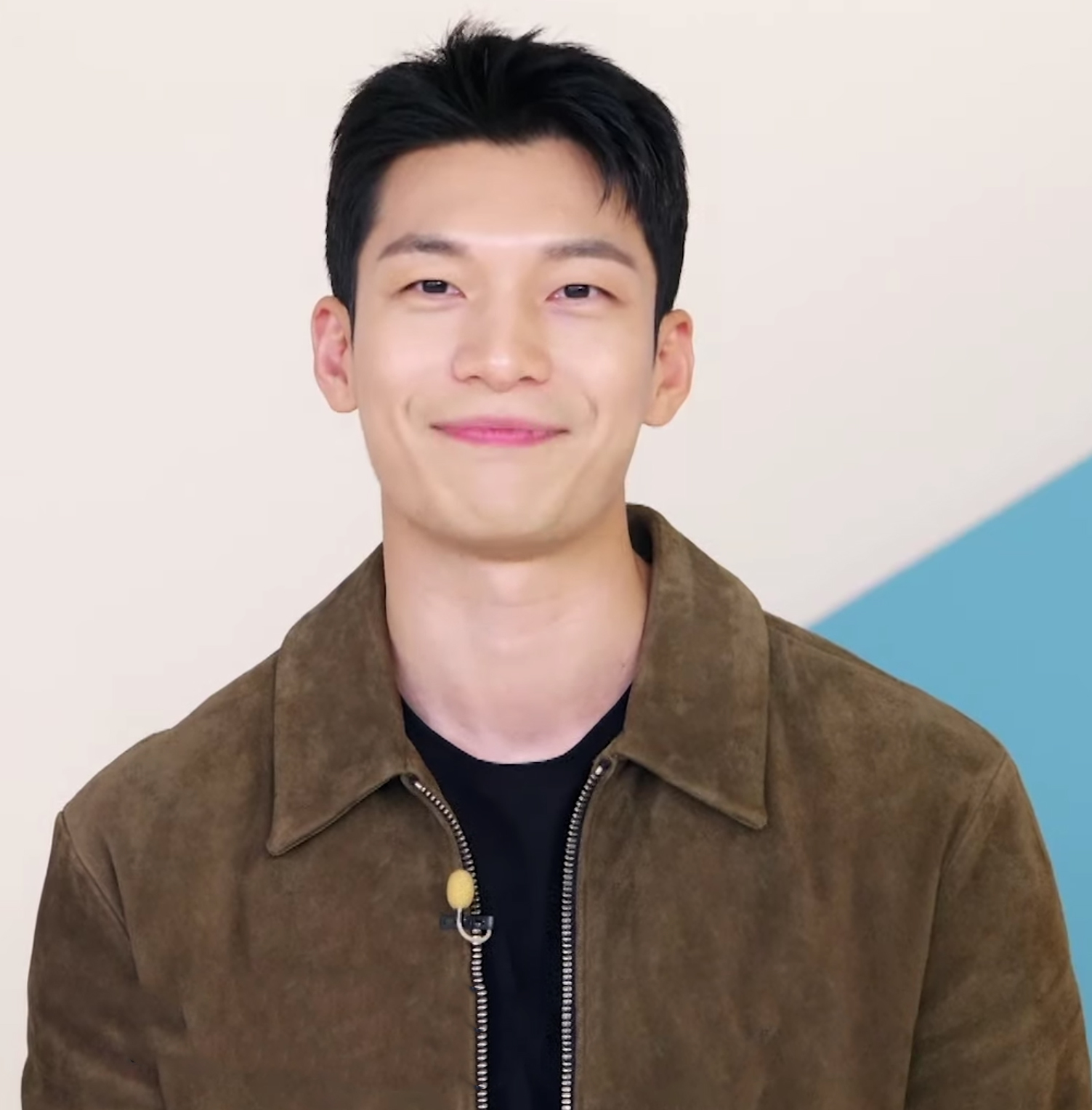
Wi Ha-joon (Police Detective Hwang Jun-ho)

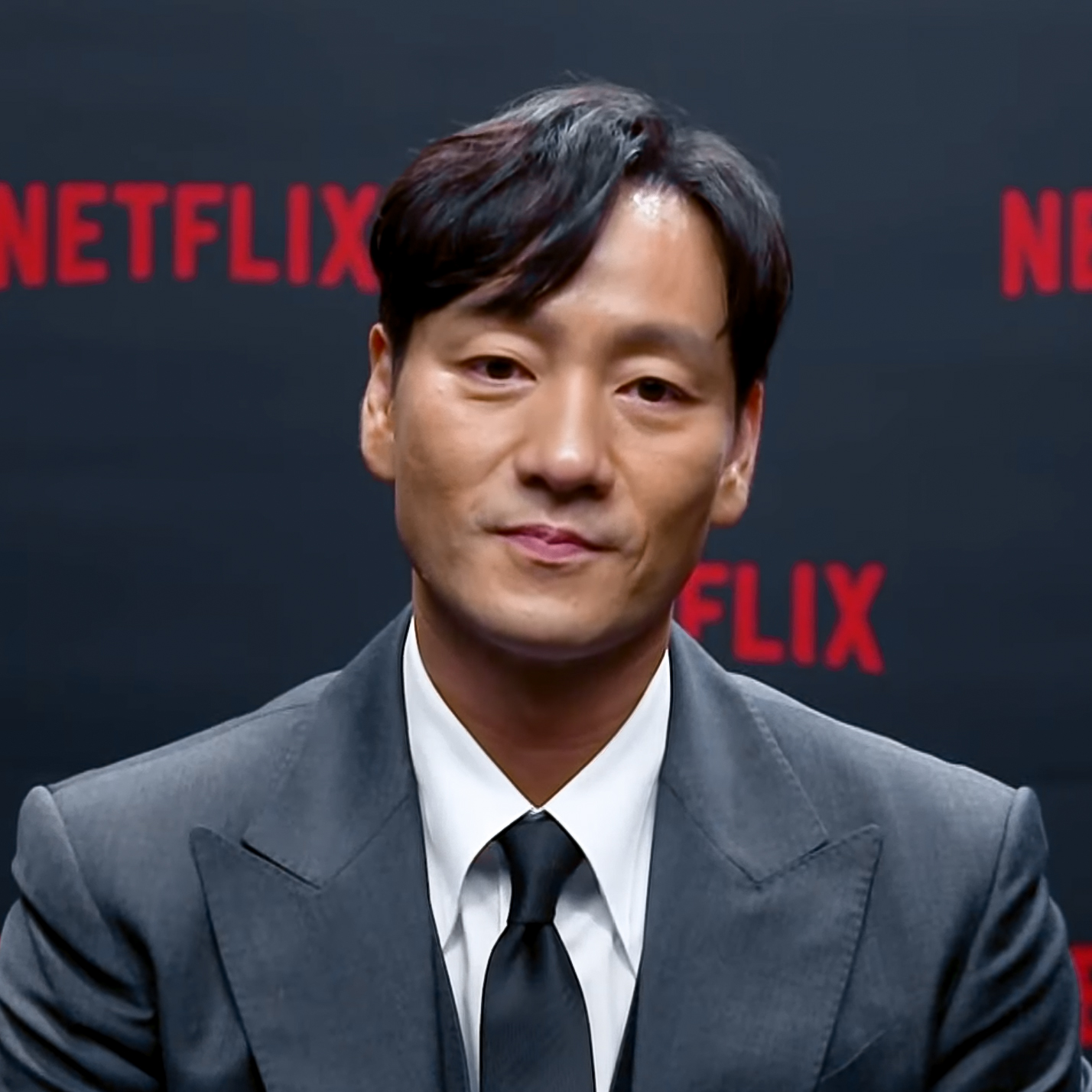
Park Hae-soo (Cho Sang-woo, Player 218)

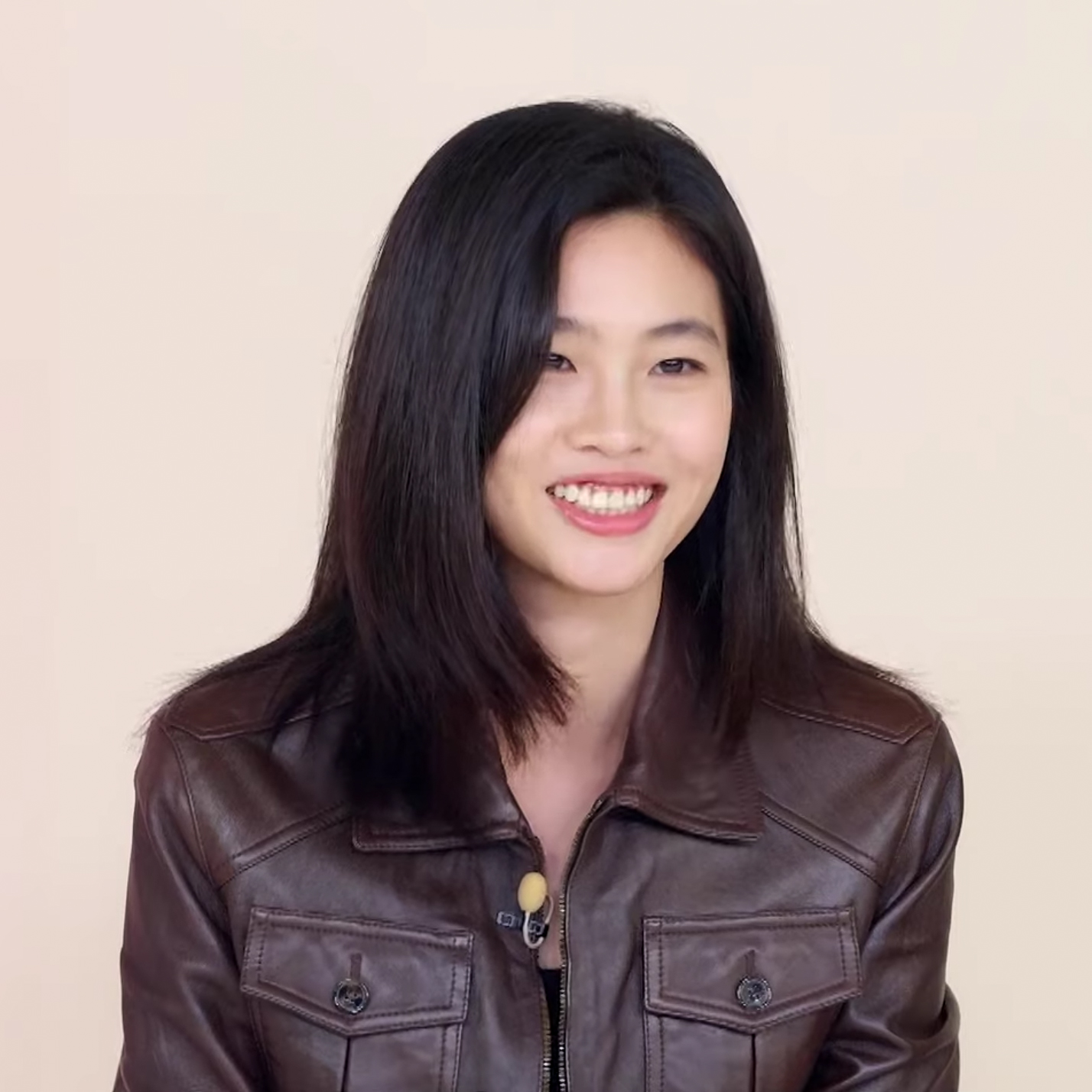
Jung Ho-yeon (Kang Sae-byeok, Player 067)

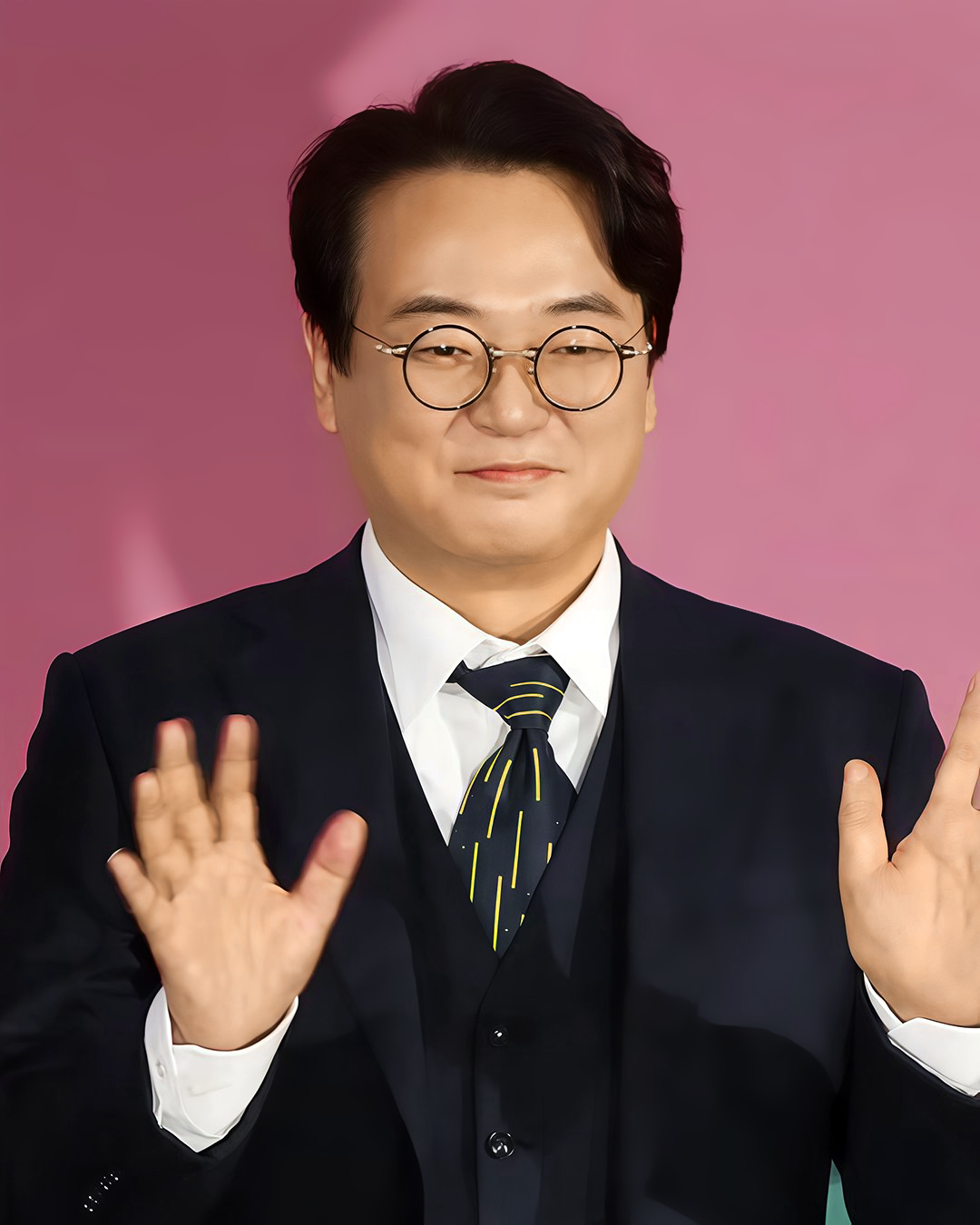
Lee Seo-hwan (Park Jung-bae, Player 390)

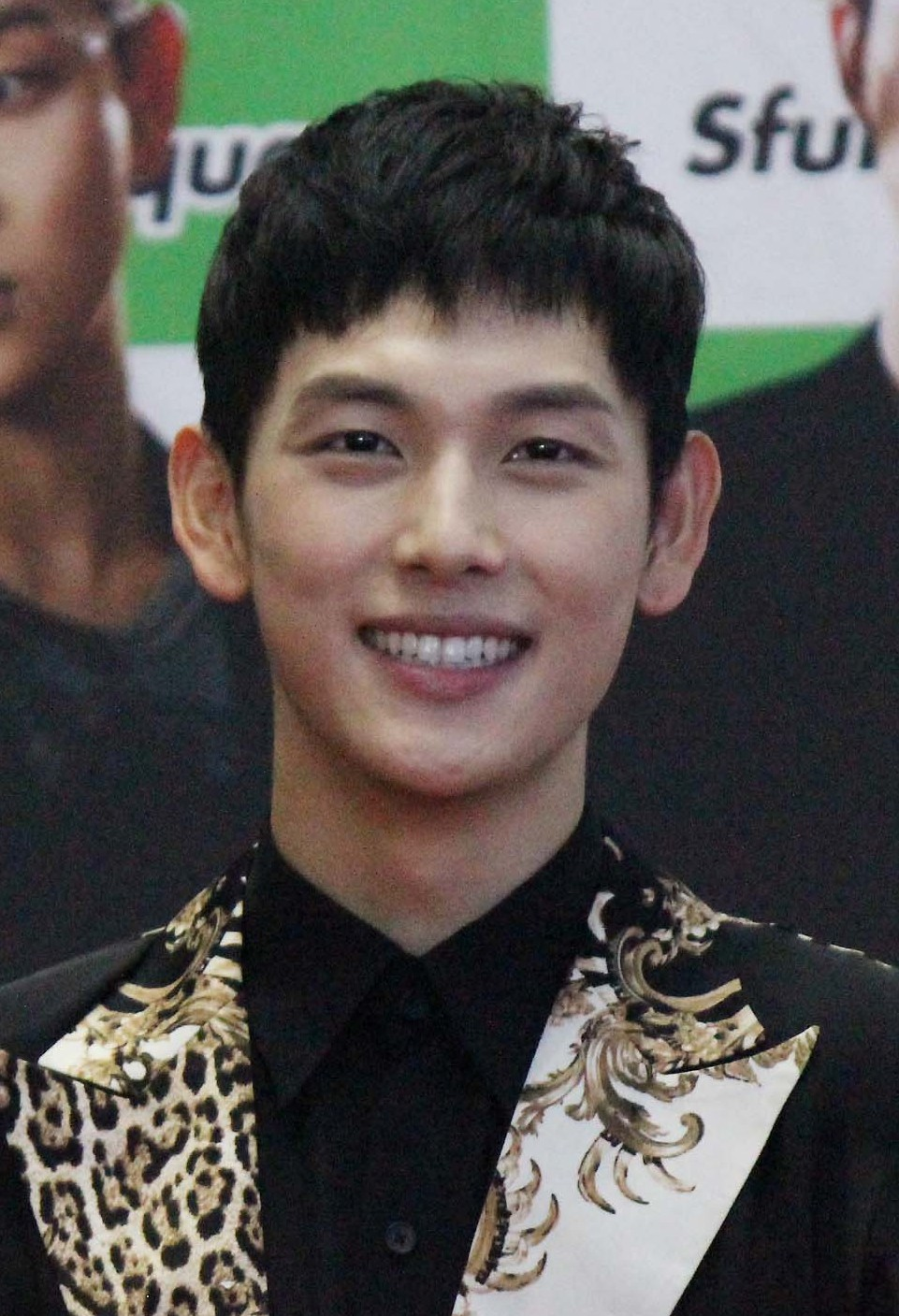
Yim Si-wan (Lee Myung-gi, Player 333)

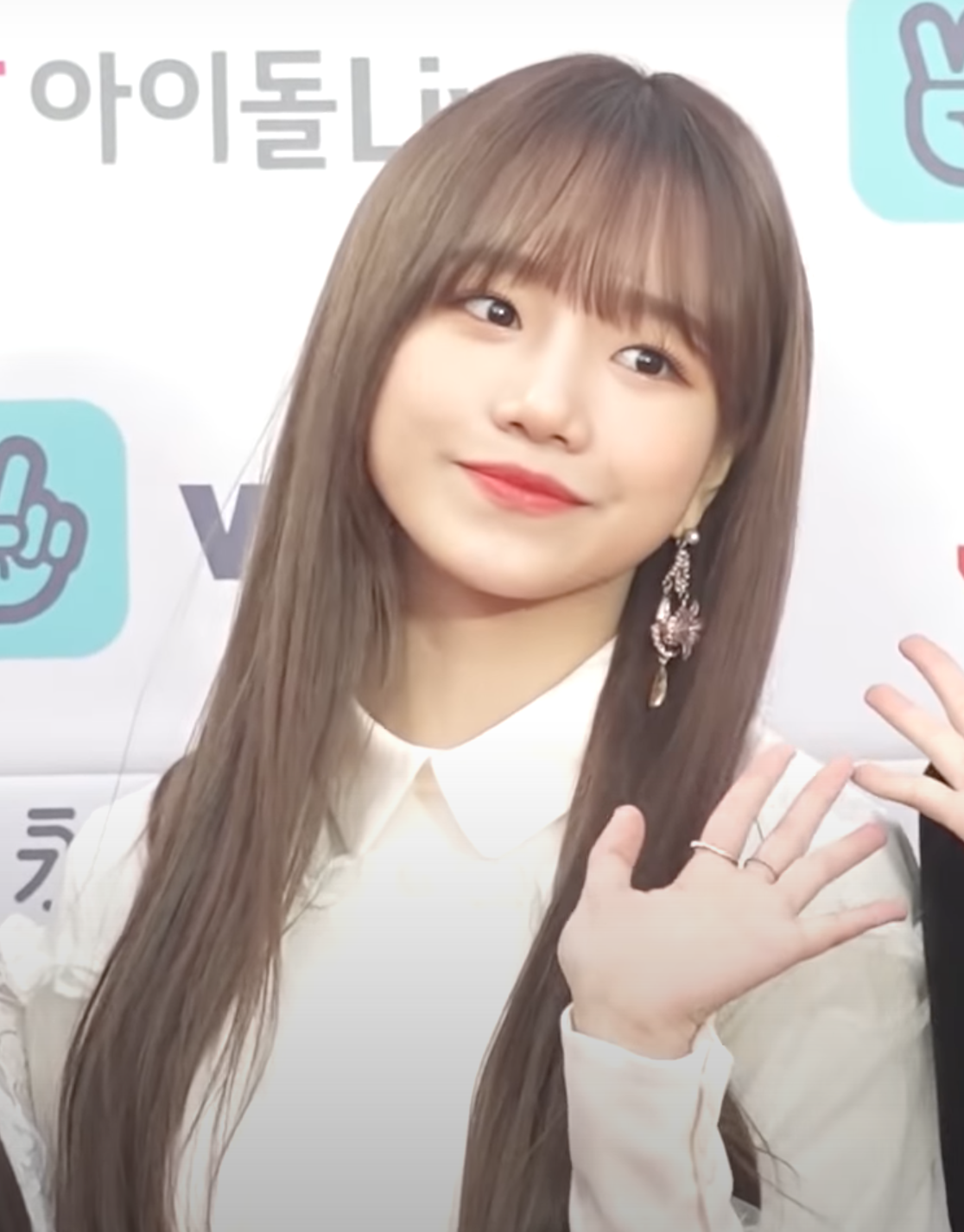
Jo Yu-ri (Kim Jun-hee, Player 222)

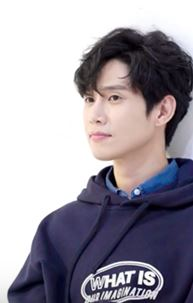
Park Sung-hoon (Cho Hyun-ju, Player 120)

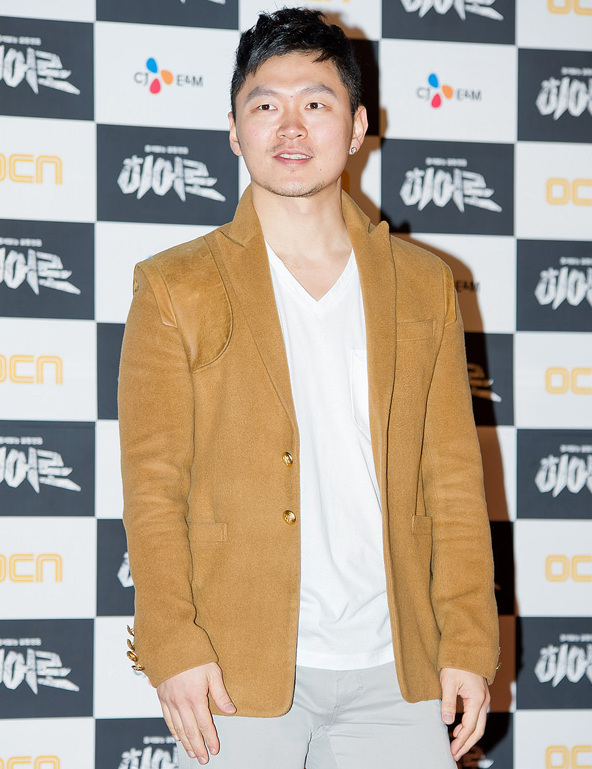
Yang Dong-geun (Park Yong-sik, Player 007)

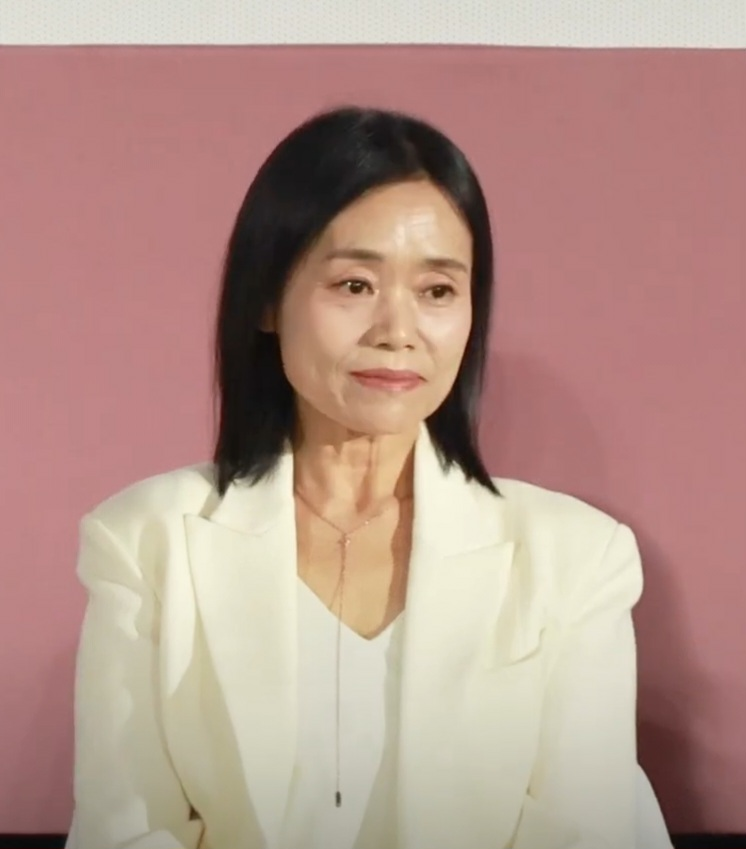
Kang Ae-shim (Jang Geum-ja, Player 149)

=== Introduced in season 1 ===
- Lee Jung-jae as Seong Gi-hun (성기훈, [sʌŋɡihun]) (456), a divorced chauffeur and gambling addict. He lives with his mother and struggles to support his daughter financially. He participates in the game to settle his many debts, and to prove himself financially stable enough to have custody of his daughter, who is to leave for the United States with her mother and stepfather. After winning the games, he sets out to end the games and find the Front Man.
- Lee Byung-hun as Hwang In-ho (황인호, [hwaŋdʑinho]) (001), the Front Man, the game overseer and the winner of the game in the 2015 edition, who after his participation does not believe that there are truly good people. He disguises himself as Player 001 under the guise of Oh Young-il for the majority of season 2 before donning the Front Man alias once again.
- Wi Ha-joon as Hwang Jun-ho (황준호, [hwaŋdʑunho]), a police detective who sneaks into the game disguised as a guard, to find his missing brother and discovers that his brother is the Front Man, the organizer of the Games himself.
- Park Hae-soo as Cho Sang-woo (조상우; [tɕosaŋu] (Note: Hwang Dong-Hyuk said the number was actually a pun using the fact that "two-eighteen" in Korean is i-sibpal (이십팔), similar to the Korean swear word ssibal (씨발, "fucker").)) (218), the former head of an investment team at a securities company. He was a junior classmate to Gi-hun, and studied at Seoul National University. He joins the game to escape the police, who want him for stealing money from his clients and racking up massive debts from bad investments. (season 1; guest, season 2)
- Jung Ho-yeon as Kang Sae-byeok (강새벽, Korean pronunciation: [kaŋsɛbjʌk̚]) (067), a North Korean defector from North Hamgyong Province, North Korea. She enters the game to pay for a broker who can rescue her parents across the border, and to buy a house for her reunited family. (season 1; guest, season 2 and 3)
- O Yeong-su as Oh Il-nam (오일남, Korean pronunciation: [oiɭɭam]) (001), an elderly man with a brain tumor who prefers playing the game as opposed to waiting to die in the outside world and who is later revealed to be the game's creator. (season 1)
- Heo Sung-tae as Jang Deok-su (장덕수, Korean pronunciation: [tɕaŋdʌks͈u]) (101), a gangster who enters the game to settle his massive gambling debts, including money he stole from his boss and underlings. (season 1)
- Anupam Tripathi as Ali Abdul (알리 압둘) (199), a migrant worker from Pakistan, who enters the game to provide for his young family after his employer withholds his wages for months. (season 1)
- Kim Joo-ryoung as Han Mi-nyeo (한미녀; [hanminjʌ]) (212), a loud and manipulative woman. Her reasons for entering the game are unexplained. (season 1)
- Lee Yoo-mi as Ji-yeong (지영; [tɕi.jʌŋ]) (240), a young woman who befriends Sae-byeok and previously served prison time for killing her abusive father (season 1)
- Lee Seo-hwan as Park Jung-bae (박정배) (390), a very good friend of Gi-hun who runs a bar and later enters the Squid Game. (season 2; guest, season 1)

=== Introduced in season 2 ===
- Yim Si-wan as Lee Myung-gi (이명기) (333), a former YouTuber who lost money as a result of a crypto scam he was involved with. He is Jun-hee's ex-boyfriend.
- Kang Ha-neul as Kang Dae-ho (강대호) (388), a former social service personnel who claims to have previously served in the Marines.
- Park Sung-hoon as Cho Hyun-ju (조현주) (120), a transgender woman and former special forces soldier who is short on money for her gender-affirming surgery.
- Lee Jin-wook as Park Gyeong-seok (박경석) (246), an amusement park artist who joins the game to get money to treat his daughter's blood cancer.
- Yang Dong-geun as Park Yong-sik (박용식) (007), a repentant gambler and the son of Geum-ja.
- Jo Yu-ri as Kim Jun-hee (김준희) (222), Myung-gi's pregnant ex-girlfriend who lost her money buying Myung-gi's crypto and is looking for a way to make a living.
- Kang Ae-shim as Jang Geum-ja (장금자) (149), Yong-sik's mother who enters the game to help pay off her son's debts.
- Park Gyu-young as Kang No-eul (강노을) (Guard 011), a former soldier and North Korean defector who works for the game as a guard, tasked with defending the game and killing eliminated players, to find her daughter who remains in North Korea.
- Chae Kook-hee as Seon-nyeo (선녀) (044), a loudmouthed, neurotic and abrasive shaman.
- Lee David as Park Min-su (박민수) (125), a silent and timid man who has trouble speaking his mind.
- Choi Seung-hyun as Choi Su-bong / "Thanos" (최수봉) (230), an arrogant, cocky rapper and ecstasy addict who targets Myung-gi throughout the course of the game because he was the victim of one of his crypto scams. (season 2, guest season 3)
- Roh Jae-won as Nam-gyu (남규) (124), a club promoter and another victim of Myung-gi's crypto scam. He acts as Thanos' right-hand man and joins him in tormenting other players, especially Myung-gi and Min-su.
- Won Ji-an as Se-mi (세미) (380), a tomboyish young woman who befriends Min-su (season 2, guest season 3)
- Song Young-chang as Im Jeong-dae (임정대) (100), a senior who enters the games to pay off massive debts he has
- Kim Si-eun as Kim Young-mi (김영미) (095), a young woman who befriends Hyun-ju (season 2)
- Park Hee-soon as The Masked Officer, In-ho's right hand man who oversees the games, controls the guards and supervises the organ trafficking ring. He is seen as a guard in black with a square mask
- Jeon Seok-ho as Choi Woo-seok, a loan shark who Gi-hun previously owed money to
- Oh Dal-su as Sea Captain Park, a sailor who assists Jun-ho and later Gi-hun's loan sharks in attempting to find the location of the games and take down the superiors.

=== Introduced in season 3 ===
- David Sayers as VIP Richard
- Jane Wong as VIP Jennifer
- Bryan Bucco as VIP John
- Jordan Lambertoni as VIP Jack
- Kevin Yorn as VIP Kevin
- Unknown as Kim Jun-hee's Baby (222)
- Cate Blanchett as the American Recruiter

== Episodes ==
Season	Episodes	Originally released
1	9	September 17, 2021
2	7	December 26, 2024
3	6	June 27, 2025

=== Season 1 (2021) ===
No. overall	No. in season	Title	Directed by	Written by	Original release date
1	1	"Red Light, Green Light"; Transliteration: "Mugunghwa kkochi pideon nal" (Korean: 무궁화 꽃이 피던 날) (Note: lit. The day hibiscus bloomed. The English title references the game Red Light, Green Light. The Korean title references the Korean version of the game.)	Hwang Dong-hyuk	Hwang Dong-hyuk	September 17, 2021
2	2	"Hell"; Transliteration: "Jiok" (Korean: 지옥)	Hwang Dong-hyuk	Hwang Dong-hyuk	September 17, 2021
3	3	"The Man with the Umbrella"; Transliteration: "Usaneul sseun namja" (Korean: 우산을 쓴 남자)	Hwang Dong-hyuk	Hwang Dong-hyuk	September 17, 2021
4	4	"Stick to the Team"; Transliteration: "Jjollyeodo pyeonmeokgi" (Korean: 쫄려도 편먹기)	Hwang Dong-hyuk	Hwang Dong-hyuk	September 17, 2021
5	5	"A Fair World"; Transliteration: "Pyeongdeunghan sesang" (Korean: 평등한 세상)	Hwang Dong-hyuk	Hwang Dong-hyuk	September 17, 2021
6	6	"Gganbu"; Transliteration: "Kkanbu" (Korean: 깐부)	Hwang Dong-hyuk	Hwang Dong-hyuk	September 17, 2021
7	7	"VIPS"	Hwang Dong-hyuk	Hwang Dong-hyuk	September 17, 2021
8	8	"Front Man"; Transliteration: "Peuronteumaen" (Korean: 프론트맨)	Hwang Dong-hyuk	Hwang Dong-hyuk	September 17, 2021
9	9	"One Lucky Day"; Transliteration: "Unsu joeun nal" (Korean: 운수 좋은 날) (Note: The title is a reference to the 1924 Korean novel with the same name that tells the story of a rickshaw man initially being happy earning a lot of money from having a lot of customers on a rainy day, and thrilled to buy his wife some soup, only to find his wife dead in her house.)	Hwang Dong-hyuk	Hwang Dong-hyuk	September 17, 2021

=== Season 2 (2024) ===
No. overall	No. in season	Title	Directed by	Written by	Original release date
10	1	"Bread and Lottery"; Transliteration: "Ppanggwa bokgwon" (Korean: 빵과 복권)	Hwang Dong-hyuk	Hwang Dong-hyuk	December 26, 2024
11	2	"Halloween Party"; Transliteration: "Hallowin pati" (Korean: 할로윈 파티)	Hwang Dong-hyuk	Hwang Dong-hyuk	December 26, 2024
12	3	"001"	Hwang Dong-hyuk	Hwang Dong-hyuk	December 26, 2024
13	4	"Six Legs"; Transliteration: "Yeoseot gaeui dari" (Korean: 여섯 개의 다리)	Hwang Dong-hyuk	Hwang Dong-hyuk	December 26, 2024
14	5	"One More Game"; Transliteration: "Han pan deo" (Korean: 한 판 더)	Hwang Dong-hyuk	Hwang Dong-hyuk	December 26, 2024
15	6	"O X"	Hwang Dong-hyuk	Hwang Dong-hyuk	December 26, 2024
16	7	"Friend or Foe"; Transliteration: "Chinguwa jeok" (Korean: 친구와 적)	Hwang Dong-hyuk	Hwang Dong-hyuk	December 26, 2024

=== Season 3 (2025) ===
No. overall	No. in season	Title	Directed by	Written by	Original release date
17	1	"Keys and Knives"; Transliteration: "Yeolsoewa kal" (Korean: 열쇠와 칼)	Hwang Dong-hyuk	Hwang Dong-hyuk	June 27, 2025
18	2	"The Starry Night"; Transliteration: "Byeori binnaneun bame" (Korean: 별이 빛나는 밤에)	Hwang Dong-hyuk	Hwang Dong-hyuk	June 27, 2025
19	3	"It's Not Your Fault"; Transliteration: "Dangsinui tasi anida" (Korean: 당신의 탓이 아니다)	Hwang Dong-hyuk	Hwang Dong-hyuk	June 27, 2025
20	4	"222"	Hwang Dong-hyuk	Hwang Dong-hyuk	June 27, 2025
21	5	"○△□"	Hwang Dong-hyuk	Hwang Dong-hyuk	June 27, 2025
22	6	"Humans Are..."; Transliteration: "Sarameun..." (Korean: 사람은...)	Hwang Dong-hyuk	Hwang Dong-hyuk	June 27, 2025

== Production ==
=== Development ===
==== Season 1 ====
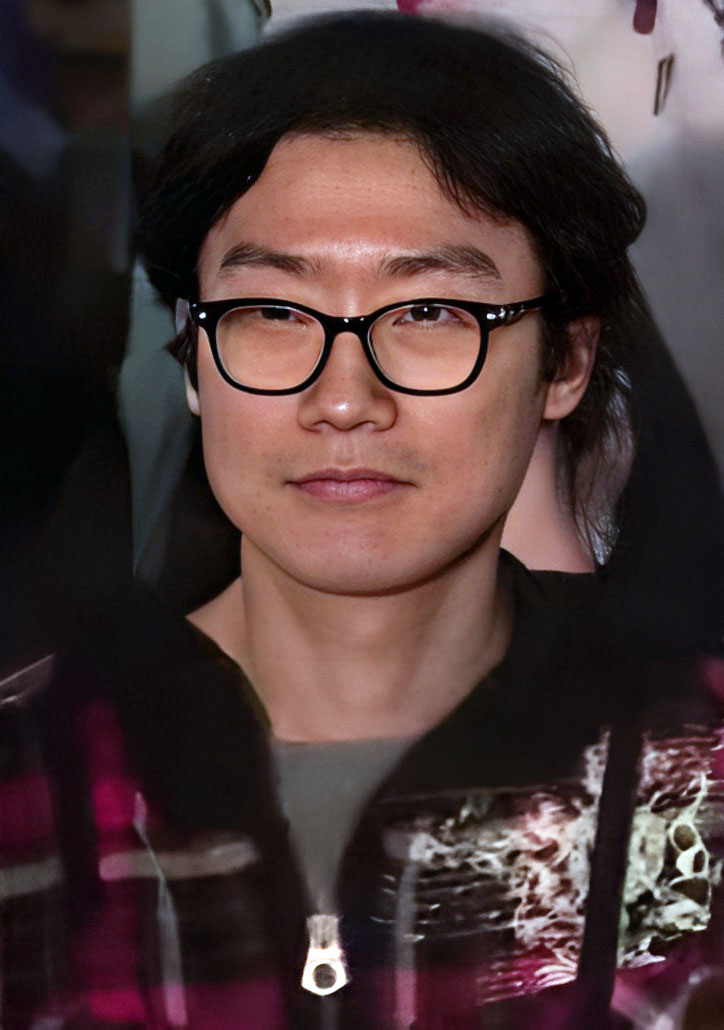
Series creator and director Hwang Dong-hyuk

Around 2008, Hwang Dong-hyuk tried unsuccessfully to get investment for a different movie script that he had written, and he, his mother, and his grandmother had to take out loans to stay afloat, but still struggled amid the debt crisis within the country. (Note: Following the bankruptcy of Lehman Brothers in September 2008 and as part of the 2008 financial crisis, banks in South Korea had tried to help provide external investments to stabilize foreign currency rates. As the crisis worsened into 2009, these stabilization attempts had failed, causing a reversing of money from the country, and forcing banks to drastically increase interest rates and seek high-risk short-term loans made to citizens to try to recover.) He spent his free time in a manhwabang (South Korean comic cafe) reading Japanese survival manga such as Battle Royale, Liar Game and Gambling Apocalypse: Kaiji. Hwang compared the characters' situation in these works to his own current situation and considered the idea of being able to join such a survival game to win money to get him out of debt, leading him to write a film script on that concept throughout 2009. Hwang stated, "I wanted to write a story that was an allegory or fable about modern capitalist society, something that depicts an extreme competition, somewhat like the extreme competition of life. But I wanted it to use the kind of characters we've all met in real life." Hwang feared the storyline was "too difficult to understand and bizarre" at the time. Hwang tried to sell his story to various South Korean production groups and actors, but had been told it was too grotesque and unrealistic. Hwang put this script aside and over the next ten years successfully completed three other films. including the crime drama film Silenced (2011) and the historical drama film The Fortress (2017).

In the 2010s, Netflix had seen a large growth in viewership outside of North America, and started investing in productions in other regions, including South Korea. In 2018, Ted Sarandos, co-CEO of Netflix, stated that they were looking for more successes from overseas productions: "The exciting thing for me would be if the next Stranger Things came from outside America. Right now, historically, nothing of that scale has ever come from anywhere but Hollywood." Netflix had opened up a division in Asia in 2018, and while they were still operating out of temporary leased office space in Seoul, Hwang brought his script to their attention. Kim Minyoung, one of Netflix's content officers for the Asian regions, recognized Hwang's talent from The Fortress and his other films, and upon seeing his script for Squid Game, knew they needed it for the service. Kim said "[W]e were looking for shows that were different from what's traditionally 'made it,' and Squid Game was exactly it". In September 2019 Netflix formally announced that they would produce Hwang's work as an original series. Netflix's Bela Bajaria, head of global television operations, said of their interest in Hwang's work that "we knew it was going to be big in Korea because it had a well-regarded director with a bold vision", and that "K-Dramas also travel well across Asia". Regarding his return to the project, Hwang commented, "It's a sad story. But the reason why I returned to the project is because the world 10 years from then has transformed to a place where these unbelievable survival stories are so fitting, and I found that this is the time when people will call these stories intriguing and realistic." Hwang further believed that the COVID-19 pandemic impacted the economic disparity between classes in South Korea, and said that "All of these points made the story very realistic for people compared to a decade ago".

With the Netflix order, the film concept was expanded out to a nine-episode series. Kim stated that there was "so much more than what was written in the 120-minute format. So we worked together to turn it into a series." Hwang said he was able to expand the script so that it "could focus on the relationships between people [and] the stories that each of the people had". Initially, Netflix had named the series Round Six, rather than Squid Game as Hwang had suggested; according to Netflix's vice president for content in Asia Kim Minyoung, while they knew that the name "squid game" would be familiar to Korean viewers from the children's game, it "wouldn't resonate because not many people would get it", and opted to use Round Six (stylized as Round 6) as it self-described the nature of the competition. It has been titled as such in Brazil (possibly while also avoiding any political connotation to do with Lula). As production continued, Hwang pushed on the service to use Squid Game instead; its cryptic name and unique visuals helped to draw in curious viewers, according to Kim. At the time that Hwang wrote the series, his goal was to have the series reach the most-watched show in Netflix in the United States for at least one day. Hwang had initially written the series as eight episodes, which was comparable to other Netflix shows, but found that the material for the last episode was longer than he planned, so it was split into two.

==== Seasons 2 and 3 ====
In late October 2021, Hwang stated he was in discussions with Netflix regarding a second season. He further stated in December 2021 that he was also discussing a third season with Netflix. Hwang wanted to produce another film first, as well as secure a contract with Netflix to release additional films he may create alongside further Squid Game seasons, so as to avoid becoming known only for Squid Game. Hwang confirmed that he had begun conceptualization work on a second season during a press event in November 2021, with plans to bring back Lee Jung-jae to reprise his role of Gi-hun. Netflix stated in response to Hwang's comments that they had not yet officially greenlit a second season, but were in discussions with Hwang towards one. During an earnings call in January 2022, Netflix's Sarandos said when asked about a second season "Absolutely...the Squid Game universe has just begun." Hwang said in April 2022 that he presently was working on Killing Old People Club, an adaption of a work called "Pape Satan Aleppe: Chronicles of a Liquid Society" by Umberto Eco (미친 세상을 이해하는 척하는 방법; "The way to pretend to understand the crazy world"), and anticipated that the second season of Squid Game would be completed and broadcast by 2024. Netflix confirmed that the second season was greenlit in June 2022. It was released on December 26, 2024.

On the day the second season was released, Hwang confirmed that the series would return for a third and final season in 2025. The season was released on June 27, 2025.

=== Writing ===
==== Season 1 ====
Hwang described the work as "a story about losers". The names of the characters – Seong Gi-hun, Cho Sang-woo, and Oh Il-nam – were all based on Hwang's childhood friends, as well as the character name Hwang Jun-ho, who was also a childhood friend in real life with an older brother named Hwang In-ho. The two main characters Gi-hun and Sang-woo were based on Hwang's own personal experiences and represented "two sides" of himself; Gi-hun shared the same aspects of being raised by an economically disadvantaged single mother in the Ssangmun district of Seoul, while Sang-woo reflected on Hwang having attended Seoul National University with high expectations from his family and neighborhood. Further, Gi-hun's background was inspired by the organizers of the SsangYong Motor labor strike of 2009 against mass layoffs.

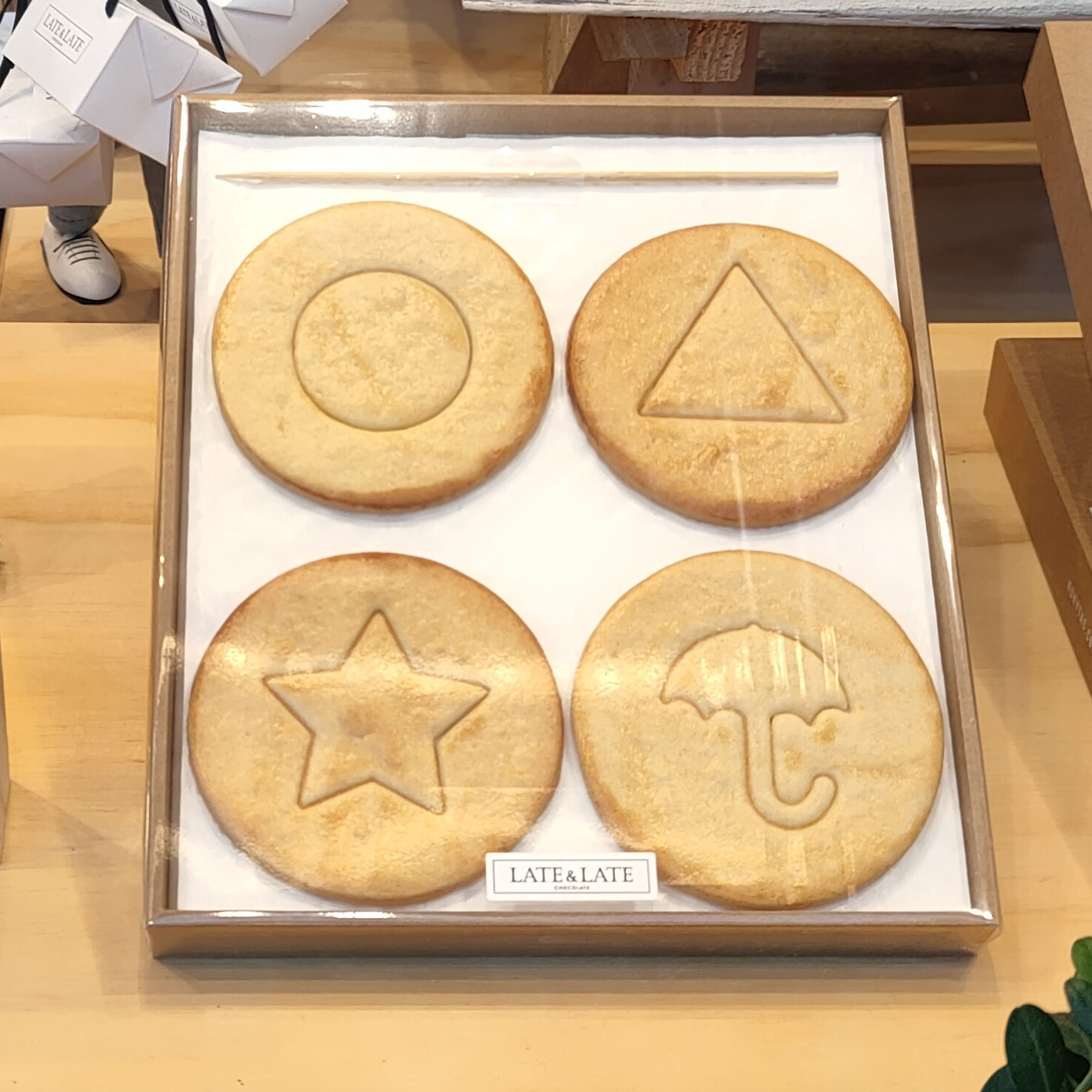
Shapes punched into dalgona, a Korean sugar candy treat, based on the shapes used in the second game of the show. Within the show, players had to extract the inner shapes intact.

Hwang based the narrative on Korean games of his childhood to show the irony of a childhood game where competition was not important becoming an extreme competition with people's lives at stake. Additionally, as his initial script was intended for film, he opted to use children's games with simple rules that were easy to explain in contrast to other survival-type films using games with complex rules. The central game he selected, the squid game, was a popular Korean children's game from the 1970s and 1980s. Hwang recalled the squid game as "the most physically aggressive childhood game I played in neighborhood alleys as a kid, which is why I also loved it the most", and because of this "it's the most symbolic game that reflects today's competitive society, so I picked it out as the show's title". The colors of the ddakji in the initial game, which are blue and red, were inspired from the Japanese urban legend Red Paper, Blue Paper. (Note: Red Paper, Blue Paper, also known by its Japanese name Akai-Kami-Aoi-Kami, is an urban legend that started from Japan that was later spread to South Korea. The legend is about a ghost that haunts the toilets and is known to ask the question, "Do you want blue toilet paper or red toilet paper?" Either option will result in the death of the person. Unlike the Korean versions, the ghost of the Japanese story has a name called "Aka Manto".) The game Red Light, Green Light was selected because of its potential to make a lot of losers in one go. Regarding the selection, Hwang said, "The game was selected because the scene filled with so many people randomly moving and stopping could be viewed as a ridiculous but a sad group dance." Hwang joked that the dalgona candy game they chose may influence sales of dalgona, similar to how sales of Korean gats (traditional hats) bloomed after the broadcast of Netflix's series Kingdom. Licking the candy to free the shape was something that Hwang said that he had done as a child and brought it into the script. Hwang had considered other Korean children's games such as Gonggi, Dong, Dong, Dongdaemun, and Why did you come to my house? (우리 집에 왜 왔니?, a Korean variant of the Hana Ichi Monme), the former later being used in the second season.

Hwang wrote all of the series himself, taking nearly six months to write the first two episodes alone, after which he turned to friends to get input on moving forward. Hwang also addressed the challenges of preparing for the show which was physically and mentally exhausting, saying that he had forgone dental health while making Season 1 and had to have six teeth pulled by his dentist after production was complete. As such, Hwang was initially unsure about a sequel after completing these episodes, though he wrote the ending to keep a potential hook for a sequel in mind. Hwang had considered an alternate ending where Gi-hun would have boarded the plane after concluding his call with the game organizers to see his daughter, but Hwang said of that ending, "Is that the right way for us to really propose the question or the message that we wanted to convey through the series?"

==== Seasons 2 and 3 ====
Due to the stress of writing and producing the first series of nine episodes himself, Hwang initially had no immediate plans to write a second season to Squid Game. He did not have well-developed plans for a follow-up story and said that if he were to write one, he would likely need a staff of writers and directors to help him. With the immense popularity of the show, Hwang later opined about the possibility of a second season, telling CNN, "There's nothing confirmed at the moment, but so many people are enthusiastic that I'm really contemplating it." Hwang said in an interview with The Times that a second season may focus more on the story of the Front Man as well as incorporating more about the police. Hwang said, "I think the issue with police officers is not just an issue in Korea. I see it on the global news that the police force can be very late in acting on things—there are more victims or a situation gets worse because of them not acting fast enough. This was an issue that I wanted to raise." He added he also wanted to explore the relationship between the cryptic Front Man and his policeman brother Hwang Jun-ho, as well as the background of the recruiter character (portrayed by Gong Yoo).

Hwang originally envisioned the second and third seasons as one, but split them up because he had too many episodes for one season. According to Hwang, after the end of the second season, Gi-hun would be a changed man "at a very critical crossroads". The season will also reveal how Hwang In-ho became the Front Man. Cheol-su, Young-hee's giant robot doll boyfriend, was introduced at the end of the second season and appeared in the third season alongside a new game.

=== Casting ===
==== Season 1 ====
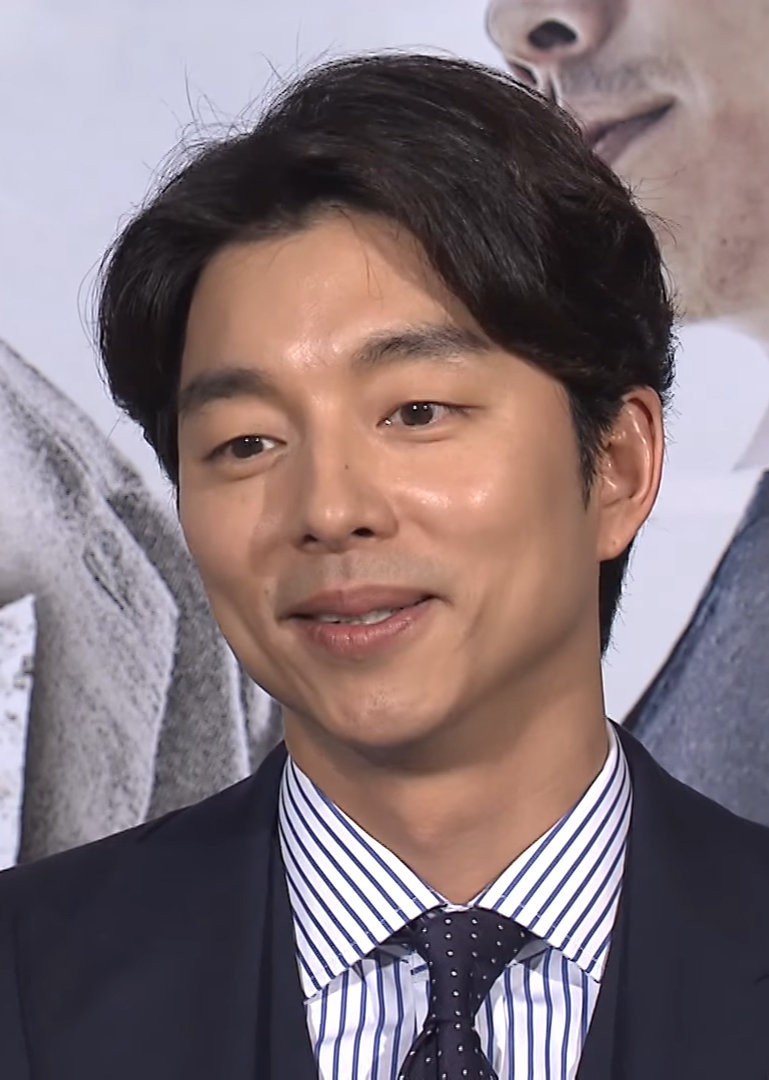
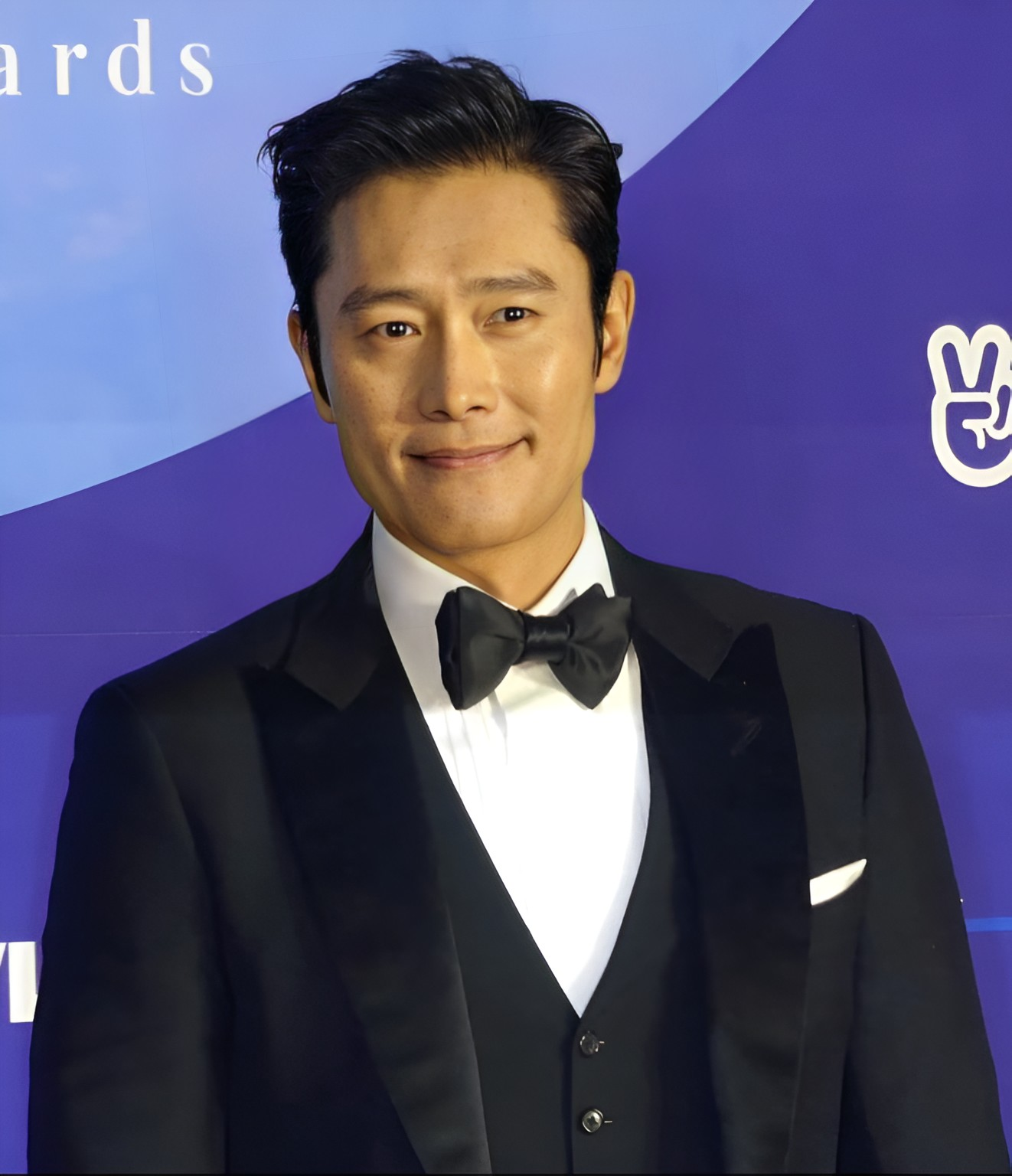
Director Hwang requested that actors Gong Yoo (left) and Lee Byung-hun (right), with whom he had previously worked, appear as the Recruiter and the Front Man, respectively, in Squid Game.

Hwang said he chose to cast Lee Jung-jae as Gi-hun as to "destroy his charismatic image portrayed in his previous roles". HoYeon Jung was requested by her new management company to send a video to audition for the series while she was finishing a shoot in Mexico and preparing for New York Fashion Week. Although this was her first audition as an actor and her expectations were low, Hwang said, "The moment I saw her audition tape from New York, I immediately thought to myself, 'this is the girl we want.' My first impression of her was that she is wild and free like an untamed horse". On casting Anupam Tripathi as Ali Abdul, Hwang said, "It was hard to find good foreign actors in Korea." He chose Anupam Tripathi because of his emotional acting capabilities and fluency in Korean. Both Gong Yoo and Lee Byung Hun had worked with Hwang during his previous films, Silenced and The Fortress respectively, and Hwang had asked both to appear in small roles within Squid Game. The VIPs were selected from non-Korean actors living in Asia; in the case of Geoffrey Giuliano, who played the VIP that interacted with Jun-ho, his prior role from Train to Busan Presents: Peninsula led to his casting for Squid Game.

Casting for the series was confirmed on June 17, 2020.

==== Season 2 ====
In April 2022, Hwang confirmed that the characters of Gi-hun and the Front Man will return for the second season. Hwang said that he would like to bring back some of the dead characters, such as Ji-yeong, and expressed regret that he had killed off several beloved characters since he did not have any plans for a second season at that time.

During Netflix's Tudum: A Global Fan Event in June 2023, Lee Jung-jae was confirmed to reprise his role alongside Lee Byung-hun, Gong Yoo and Wi Ha-joon. On June 29, Netflix released more info on the new season's cast, which includes Kang Ha-neul, Park Sung-hoon, Yim Si-wan, Yang Dong-geun, Park Gyu-young, Lee Jin-wook, Won Ji-an, Jo Yu-ri, Kang Ae-shim, Lee David, and Roh Jae-won. Controversy arose when it was revealed that T.O.P, a former member of the band BigBang with a drug-related conviction during military service in 2016, was cast in the second season.

=== Costume, set design, and filming ===
==== Season 1 ====
External videos
- Squid Game – Behind the Scenes, from Netflix

Production and filming of the series ran from June to October 2020, including a mandatory month-long break due to the COVID-19 pandemic. City scenes were filmed in Daejeon, while the island set pieces were filmed on Seongapdo located in Ongjin.

The shapes of ojingo played heavily in the graphic design of the show.

As Netflix was targeting the work for a global audience, the visuals were emphasized and some of the rules of the children's games were simplified to avoid potential issues with the language barrier. The colorful sets and costumes were designed to look like a fantasy world. The players and soldiers each wear a distinctive color, to reduce the sense of individuality and emphasize the difference between the two groups. The green tracksuits worn by the players were inspired by 1970s athletic wear, known as trainingbok (트레이닝복). The maze-like corridors and stairs drew inspiration from the 4-dimensional stair drawings of M. C. Escher including Relativity. Production designer Chae Kyoung-sun said these seemingly infinite stairways represented "a form of bondage for the contestants". The complex network of tunnels between the arena, the dorm, and the administrative office was inspired by ant colonies.

Chae was also inspired by the Saemaul Undong political initiative of the 1970s aimed to modernize rural South Korean villages. The mint green and pink color theme throughout the show were a common theme from South Korean schools in the 1970s and 1980s. Green-suited characters develop associations of fear with pink through its use in guard outfits and the stairway room.

The players' dormitory was envisioned with the concept of "people who are abandoned on the road" according to Chae; this was also used in the tug-of-war game. The room was designed using white tiles and the curved opening like a vehicular tunnel. The bed and stairs initially were laid out to look like warehouse shelves, but as the episodes progressed and these furnishing used as makeshift defenses, they took the appearance of broken ladders and stairs, implying the way these players were trapped with no way out, according to Chae. The dinner scene that took place in the eighth episode was inspired by the art installation The Dinner Party by Judy Chicago. Walls of many of the areas where the games took place were painted in skies inspired by The Empire of Light series by René Magritte.

The crew spent the most time crafting the set for the Marbles game, creating a mix of realism and fakeness as to mirror the life and death nature of the games themselves. Chae stated that this set was designed as a combination of small theatrical stages, each stage representing parts of Player 001's memories. The VIP room was one of the last pieces to be designed, and Chae said that they decided on an animal-based theme for both the costumes and room for this; "The VIPs are the kind of people who take other people's lives for entertainment and treat them like game pieces on a chessboard, so I wanted to create a powerful and instinctive look for the room."

Most sets were a combination of practical sets and chroma key backgrounds. For example, in the Glass Stepping Stones scenes, the set, designed as if in a circus tent for the players performing for the VIPs, was only 1.5 metres (4.9 ft) off the ground, using chroma key screens to simulate the height in post-production. In filming, this was far enough from the ground to make the actors nervous, which contributed to the scene. The tug-of-war set was actually set more than 10 metres (33 ft) off the ground, which further created anxiety for some of the actors with fears of heights.

The robot doll in the first episode, "Red Light, Green Light", was inspired by Young-hee, a character who appeared on the covers of South Korean textbooks Chul-soo and Young-hee in the 1970s and 1980s, and her hairstyle was inspired by Hwang's daughter's. The doll singsongs, in Korean, "Mugunghwa flower has blossomed", referring to the Hibiscus syriacus, the national flower of South Korea. The use of this familiar character was meant to juxtapose memories of childhood and unsettling fear in the players, according to Chae. Similarly, the set for the dalgona game, using giant pieces of playground equipment, were to evoke players' memories of their childhood, and was a common place where South Korean children would have played dalgona with friends. The dalgona used in "The Man with the Umbrella" were made by a street vendor from Daehangno.

Throughout the series, the trio of circle, triangle, and square shapes appear frequently on the cards given to recruit players, on the guards' masks, and in the show's title card in most language adaptations. These are shapes associated with the playing field for the children's game of Squid (ojingeo). They are also used to represent the hierarchy of the guards within the complex. Following from the comparison with an ant colony, the guards with circles are considered the workers, triangles as the soldiers, and squares as the managers (see also: Korean honorifics).

==== Seasons 2 and 3 ====
Principal photography for the second season was scheduled to start in July 2023 and was expected to last for "at least 10 months". On July 10, staff members of the production faced a controversy involving allegations of mistreatment towards citizens during filming at Incheon Airport. The production company issued an official apology on the matter. Filming was reportedly underway in August 2023. Filming took place simultaneously with the third season and wrapped in June 2024.

In Season 2, players vote whether to continue or end the games and split the accumulated money, wearing designated "X" or "O" patches (pictured).

The second season's new voting system, differing significantly from the first season, allows players to vote after every game whether to continue the competition or leave with a share of the accumulated prize money. In an interview with The Hollywood Reporter, Hwang explained that the new red-and-blue voting system was designed to emphasize the idea of forced division and the pressure to take sides. The redesigned dormitory set includes large red and blue symbols and lines that physically split the room.

=== Music ===
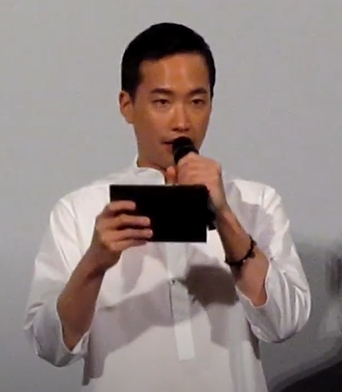
Jung Jae-il composed the score for the series.

Jung Jae-il, who previously composed the soundtrack for Parasite, composed and directed Squid Game's score. To prevent it from becoming boring, he asked the help of composers Park Min-ju, and Kim Sung-soo, a music director for musicals who uses the stage name "23" as a composer.

Two classical music pieces are also used throughout the show as part of the players' routine: the third movement of Joseph Haydn's "Trumpet Concerto" is used to wake the players, and Johann Strauss II's "The Blue Danube" is used to indicate the start of a new game. Ludwig van Beethoven's "Fifth Symphony" is also heard in the VIP lounge. A cover of "Fly Me to the Moon", (Note: Hwang revealed that the music figures used for the project were the ones in the gas station where he wrote the script, and that they were playing "Fly Me to the Moon", and this is why he used the music for the show.) arranged by Jung and sung by South Korean artist Joo Won Shin, was used over the "Red Light, Green Light" game of the first episode; according to Joo, Hwang wanted a contrast between the brutal killing of the players and the "romantic and beautiful lyrics and melody" of the song, such that the scene "embodies the increasingly polarized capitalist society that we live in today in a very compressed and cynical way".

For the song "Way Back Then" that accompanies children playing Squid Game, Jung wanted to use instruments that he practiced in elementary school, such as recorders and castanets. The rhythm of the song is based on a 3-3-7 clapping rhythm that is commonly used in South Korea to cheer someone on. The recorder, played by Jung himself, had a slight "beep", which was unintentional. The song "Round VI" was played by the Budapest Scoring Orchestra. The soundtrack was released on September 17, 2021.

Jung returned to score the second season, with the soundtrack album being released on December 27, 2024, through Netflix Music. Jung confirmed his involvement in 2023, telling the BBC the second season would retain some elements from the score to the first season but have a "more bizarre and unique sound". The second season also features the aria "Nessun dorma" from Giacomo Puccini's Turandot and "Time to Say Goodbye" by Sarah Brightman and Andrea Bocelli.

== Release ==
The first season of Squid Game was released on September 17, 2021, in more than 190 countries. The second season was released on December 26, 2024. The third and final season was announced alongside the premiere of the second season, and it was released on June 27, 2025.

== Marketing ==
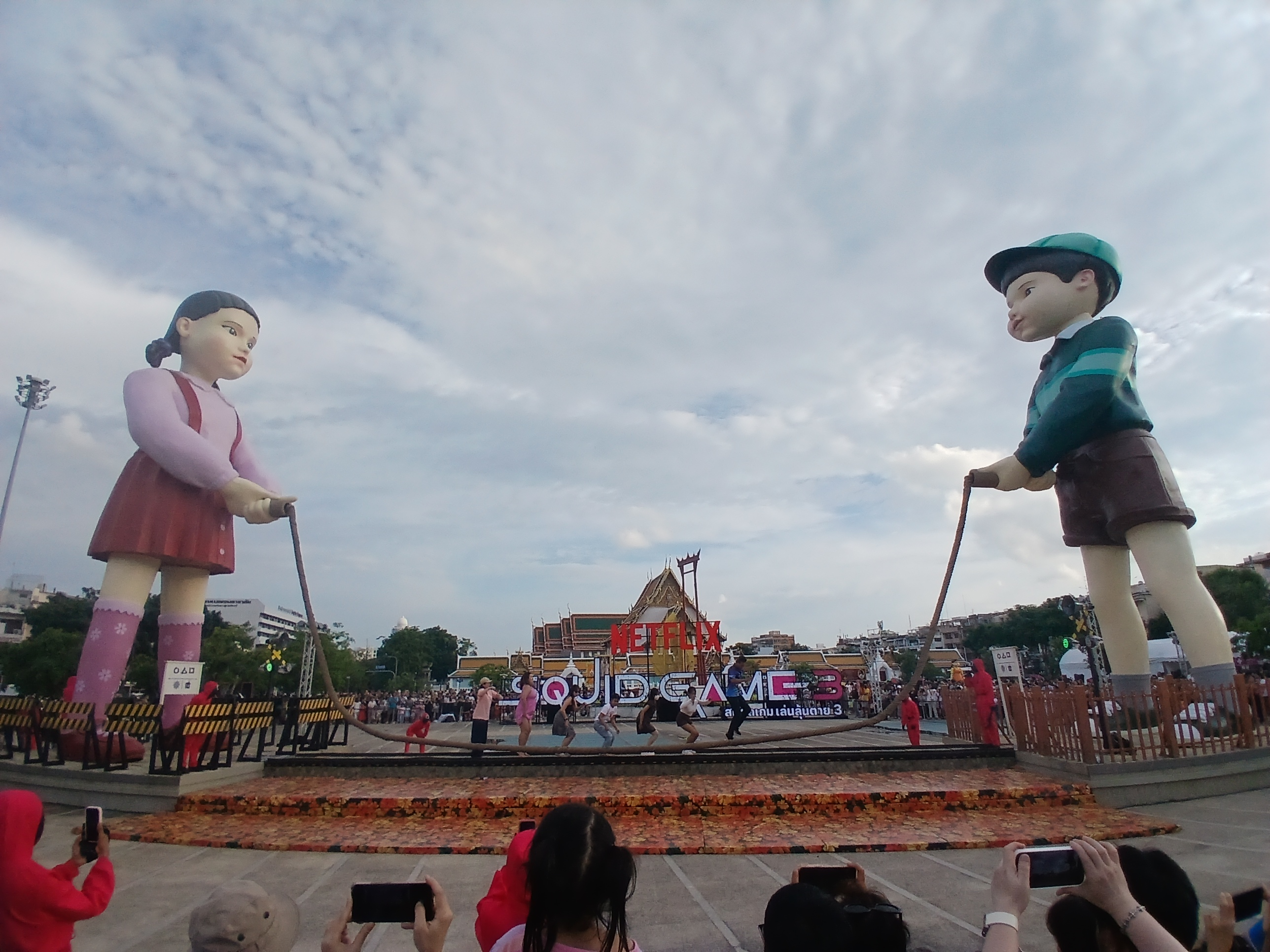
A promotional event for Squid Game at Lan Khon Mueang, a town square near Wat Suthat and Giant Swing

In the Philippines, a replica of the doll used in the first episode of the series was exhibited on Ortigas Avenue in Quezon City in September 2021.

A replica of Squid Game's set was exhibited at the Itaewon station in Seoul since September 5, 2021. However, the exhibit was prematurely closed due to COVID-19 concerns.

A Squid Game pop-up store opened in Paris on October 2 and 3, 2021, and a person could win a free one-month Netflix subscription if they managed to get the right shape from the dalgona in one minute and 30 seconds.

In the Netherlands, Netflix hosted its own Squid Game where people were able to play the game Red Light, Green Light in both Maastricht and Rotterdam. A replica of the doll was exhibited and staff were dressed as guards. Winners were awarded with Squid Game memorabilia. The event attracted hundreds of people. Similar events featuring replicas of the doll occurred across the world, including Sydney and the United Kingdom.

In October 2021, the Hollywood Reporter interviewed Netflix Asia's executive Kim Minyoung, who said that the company was looking into a possible video game adaptation of the series.

Netflix has licensed Squid Game for merchandising. A Young-hee vinyl figure was released in January 2022. Funko released a set of Squid Game themed Funko Pop! figurines in May 2022.

During Netflix Geeked Week in September 2024, a poster and a teaser for season 2 were released. On December 19, 2024, a rave party related to the season was held in London. Famous streamer Ibai Llanos organized his own version of Squid Game with KFC. Filipino journalist MJ Marfori attended the three-day event for the season and also interviewed Lee Jung-jae. In Thailand, several events were hosted to promote Squid Game, including a recreation of the skipping rope game at Lan Khon Mueang, a town square near Wat Suthat and Giant Swing.

Call of Duty teamed up with Squid Game to create a special bundle, with Tom Choi reprising his role as the masked voice of the Front Man. A new operator comes in the form of a frontman from the show, with operators receiving skins for players and the guards. New game modes were added to Call of Duty that comes from the show.

== Reception ==
=== Critical reception ===
Critical response of Squid Game
Season	Rotten Tomatoes	Metacritic
1	95% (77 reviews)	69 (13 reviews)
2	84% (98 reviews)	62 (36 reviews)
3	78% (79 reviews)	67 (26 reviews)

==== Season 1 ====
The first season received critical acclaim. On the review aggregator website Rotten Tomatoes, 95% of 77 critics' reviews are positive, with an average rating of 8.3/10. The website's consensus reads: "The website's critics consensus reads: "Squid Game's unflinching brutality is not for the faint of heart, but sharp social commentary and a surprisingly tender core will keep viewers glued to the screen – even if it's while watching between their fingers." Metacritic, which uses a weighted average, assigned the season a score of 69 out of 100, based on 13 critics, indicating "generally favorable" reviews.

==== Season 2 ====
The second season received generally positive reviews from critics. On the review aggregator website Rotten Tomatoes, 84% of 98 critics' reviews are positive, with an average rating of 7.2/10. The website's consensus reads: "While Squid Game's return can't help but lose the element of surprise, some absolutely diabolical challenges and a knotty moral outlook keep this sophomore season thrilling." Metacritic, which uses a weighted average, assigned the season a score of 62 out of 100, based on 36 critics, indicating "generally favorable" reviews.

==== Season 3 ====
The third and final season received generally positive reviews from critics. On the review aggregator website Rotten Tomatoes, 78% of 79 critics' reviews are positive, with an average rating of 7/10. The website's consensus reads: "The games reach a grim crescendo in this climactic third season, repeating familiar beats but with a ruthlessness that drives creator Hwang Dong-hyuk's themes home." Metacritic, which uses a weighted average, assigned the season a score of 67 out of 100, based on 26 critics, indicating "generally favorable" reviews. However, some news outlets reported that audience reception to the third season was more mixed, showing roughly half-positive and half-negative user reviews on Rotten Tomatoes. The New York Times commented that to justify a second or third season as a creative work, "there had to be something that surprised us," and criticized the show for repeating formulas it had only recently established. The review noted that while the protagonist Gi-hun's decisions provided tension, some supporting characters drawn from Western and war film archetypes felt one-dimensional and predictable. It further argued that while Hwang Dong-hyuk still staged action skillfully, his imagination seemed lacking.

=== Viewership ===
The first season of the series became the first Korean drama to top Netflix's top ten weekly most-watched TV show charts globally. It reached number one in 94 countries, including the United States and the United Kingdom. Netflix estimated that Squid Game had drawn over 111 million member households worldwide after 17 days of availability, (Note: One "viewer" is defined by Netflix as a subscriber having viewed any portion of a work longer than two minutes.) and over 142 million member households after 28 days, and becoming the service's most-watched series at its launch. After Netflix revamped its published metrics of viewership in November 2021 based on total hours watched of the series, Squid Game remained the most-watched show on the service, with over 1.65 billion hours within its first 28 days compared to Bridgerton's 625 million hours.

=== Public response and impact ===
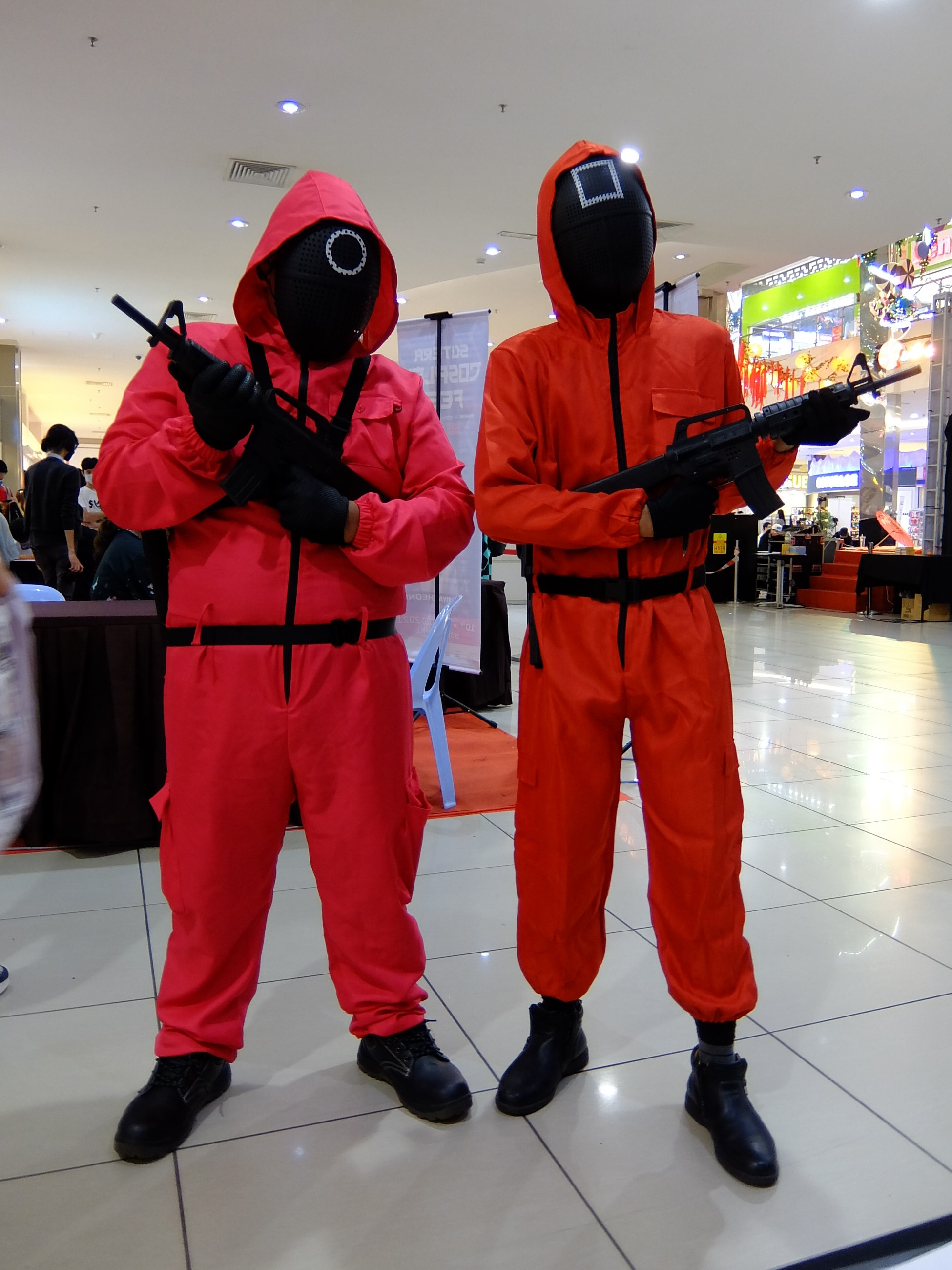
People cosplaying as guards from the series

Squid Game is considered one of the latest examples of the Korean Wave, the growing trend of popular South Korean media to gain international attention since the early 2010s, similar to popular Korean pop acts like BTS and Korean dramas and films like Parasite. Such works had drawn more attention due to streaming services like Netflix and YouTube making South Korean content, traditionally controlled by the country's national broadcasters, available across the globe. Further, according to Choe Sang-Hun of The New York Times, South Korean creators have a way of taking ideas from foreign works and applying their own cultural spin on it that draws in more audiences.

== Accolades ==
=== Awards and nominations ===
The first season's four SAG Award nominations also made history in it becoming the first non-English series and first Korean series to be nominated for Outstanding Performance by an Ensemble in a Drama Series. Individually, Lee Jung-jae became the first male actor from Asia and South Korea to receive an individual SAG Award nomination in television and HoYeon Jung became the second actress of Asian as well as Korean descent to do the same. With both actors winning, the show made history in becoming the first non-English language television series to win at the SAG Awards. The show also received 14 nominations for the Primetime Emmy Awards, including for Best Drama, making it the first non-English show to be nominated in this category.

== Themes and analysis ==
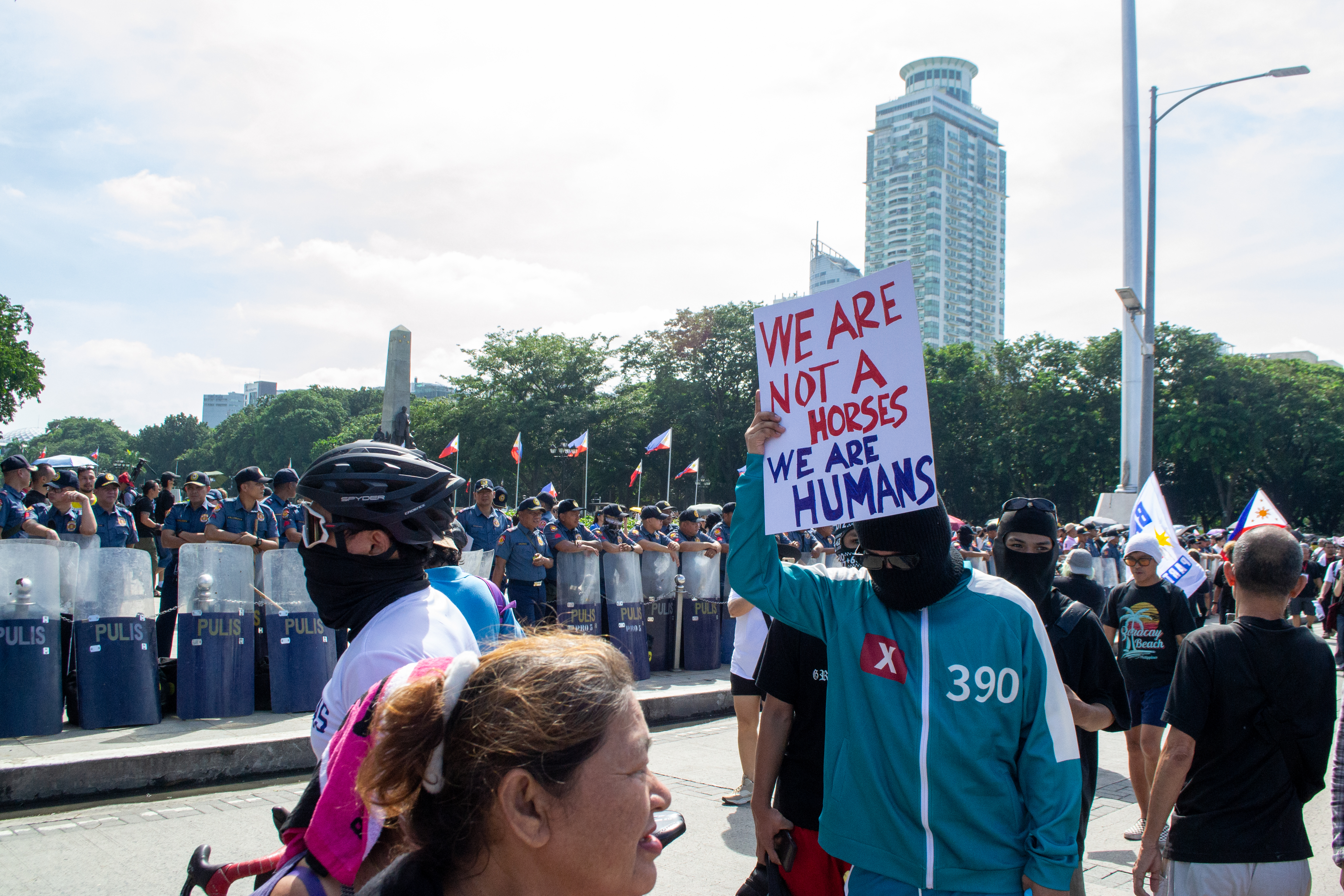
Filipino protester in Squid Game cosplay holding a picket sign showing the divide between protestors and the political elite during the Asian Spring.

Hwang wrote Squid Game based on his own personal experiences and observations of capitalism and economic class struggles within South Korea. Hwang also considered that his script was targeted towards global issues regarding capitalism, stating, "I wanted to create something that would resonate not just for Korean people but globally. This was my dream." He added, "I do believe that the overall global economic order is unequal and that around 90% of the people believe that it's unfair. During the pandemic, poorer countries can't get their people vaccinated. They're contracting viruses on the streets and even dying. So I did try to convey a message about modern capitalism. As I said, it's not profound."

== Related works ==
Hwang had also worked with Netflix to create a mockumentary inspired by Squid Game's success, titled The Best Show on the Planet. Hwang said the comedy was based on his own personal experience of being pushed into the spotlight due to the rapid and ongoing success of Squid Game.

Netflix announced a reality competition series, Squid Game: The Challenge, in June 2022 along with an open casting call. The ten-episode series saw 456 players competing for a US$4.56 million cash prize, with challenges based on those in the show. Production was a joint work of Studio Lambert and The Garden. The filming started in early 2023 at Cardington Studios in Bedfordshire. The first five episodes of the show were released internationally on November 22, 2023, while four more episodes were released on November 29, with its finale released on December 6; a second season was announced. On 10 July 2025, the show was renewed for a third season. On 3 March 2026, Netflix announced that the third season, retitled Squid Game: The VIP Challenge, would feature 8 celebrity VIP players.

Netflix released Squid Game: Unleashed in December 2024, a video game that lets players compete as characters playing the children's games featured in the show. The game gave players rewards for watching each episode.

Deadline Hollywood reported in October 2024 that an English-language spin-off of Squid Game for Netflix, produced by David Fincher, was in development. Preliminary reports indicated the show, to be called Squid Game: America, was set to start production in Los Angeles in February 2026; however, in August 2026, it was reported that the series was no longer in the works.

== See also ==
- Battle royal – Fight involving three or more combatants
