= List of Filistatidae species =

This page lists all described species of the spider family Filistatidae accepted by the World Spider Catalog as of May 2024:

== A ==
=== Afrofilistata ===
Afrofilistata Benoit, 1968

- A. fradei (Berland & Millot, 1940) (type) — West, Central Africa, Sudan

=== Andoharano ===
Andoharano Lehtinen, 1967

- A. ansieae Zonstein & Marusik, 2015 — Namibia
- A. decaryi (Fage, 1945) (type) — Madagascar
- A. grandidieri (Simon, 1901) — Madagascar
- A. griswoldi Magalhaes & Grismado, 2019 — Madagascar
- A. lehtineni Magalhaes & Grismado, 2019 — Madagascar
- A. milloti Legendre, 1972 — Madagascar
- A. monodi Legendre, 1972 — Madagascar
- A. ramirezi Magalhaes & Grismado, 2019 — Madagascar
- A. rollardae Magalhaes & Grismado, 2019 — Madagascar
- A. simoni Magalhaes & Grismado, 2019 — Madagascar
- A. woodae Magalhaes & Grismado, 2019 — Madagascar
- A. zonsteini Magalhaes & Grismado, 2019 — Madagascar

=== Antilloides ===
Antilloides Brescovit, Sánchez-Ruiz & Alayón, 2016

- A. abeli Brescovit, Sánchez-Ruiz & Alayón, 2016 (type) — Cuba
- A. chupacabras Magalhaes, 2018 — Mexico
- A. cubitas Brescovit, Sánchez-Ruiz & Alayón, 2016 — Cuba
- A. haitises Brescovit, Sánchez-Ruiz & Alayón, 2016 — Dominican Rep.
- A. mesoliticus Brescovit, Sánchez-Ruiz & Alayón, 2016 — Cuba
- A. zozo Brescovit, Sánchez-Ruiz & Alayón, 2016 — Virgin Is., Puerto Rico

== F ==
=== Filistata ===
Filistata Latreille, 1810

- Filistata albens Zonstein & Marusik, 2019 – Israel
- Filistata balouchi Zamani & Marusik, 2020 – Iran
- Filistata betarif (Magalhaes, Aharon, Ganem & Gavish-Regev, 2022) – Israel
- Filistata canariensis Schmidt, 1976 – Canary Is.
- Filistata gomerensis Wunderlich, 1992 – Canary Is.
- Filistata hasselti Simon, 1906 – Indonesia (Java?)
- Filistata insidiatrix (Forsskål, 1775) (type) – Cape Verde Is., Mediterranean to Turkmenistan
- Filistata lehtineni Marusik & Zonstein, 2014 – Azerbaijan, Iran
- Filistata lubinae Zonstein & Marusik, 2019 – Israel
- Filistata maguirei Marusik & Zamani, 2015 – Iran
- Filistata pseudogomerensis Wunderlich, 1992 – Canary Is.
- Filistata pygmaea Zonstein, Marusik & Grabolle, 2018 – Portugal
- Filistata teideensis Wunderlich, 1992 – Canary Is.
- Filistata wunderlichi Zonstein & Marusik, 2019 – Spain

=== Filistatinella ===
Filistatinella Gertsch & Ivie, 1936

- F. chilindrina Magalhaes & Ramírez, 2017 — Mexico
- F. crassipalpis (Gertsch, 1935) (type) — USA
- F. domestica Desales-Lara, 2012 — Mexico
- F. hermosa Magalhaes & Ramírez, 2017 — USA
- F. howdyall Magalhaes & Ramírez, 2017 — USA
- F. kahloae Magalhaes & Ramírez, 2017 — Mexico
- F. palaciosi Jiménez & Palacios-Cardiel, 2012 — Mexico
- F. pistrix Magalhaes & Ramírez, 2017 — USA
- F. spatulata Magalhaes & Ramírez, 2017 — USA, Mexico
- F. tohono Magalhaes & Ramírez, 2017 — USA

=== Filistatoides ===
Filistatoides F. O. Pickard-Cambridge, 1899

- F. insignis (O. Pickard-Cambridge, 1896) (type) — Mexico, Guatemala
- F. polita (Franganillo, 1936) — Cuba
- F. xichu Brescovit, Sánchez-Ruiz & Alayón, 2016 — Mexico

== K ==
=== Kukulcania ===
Kukulcania

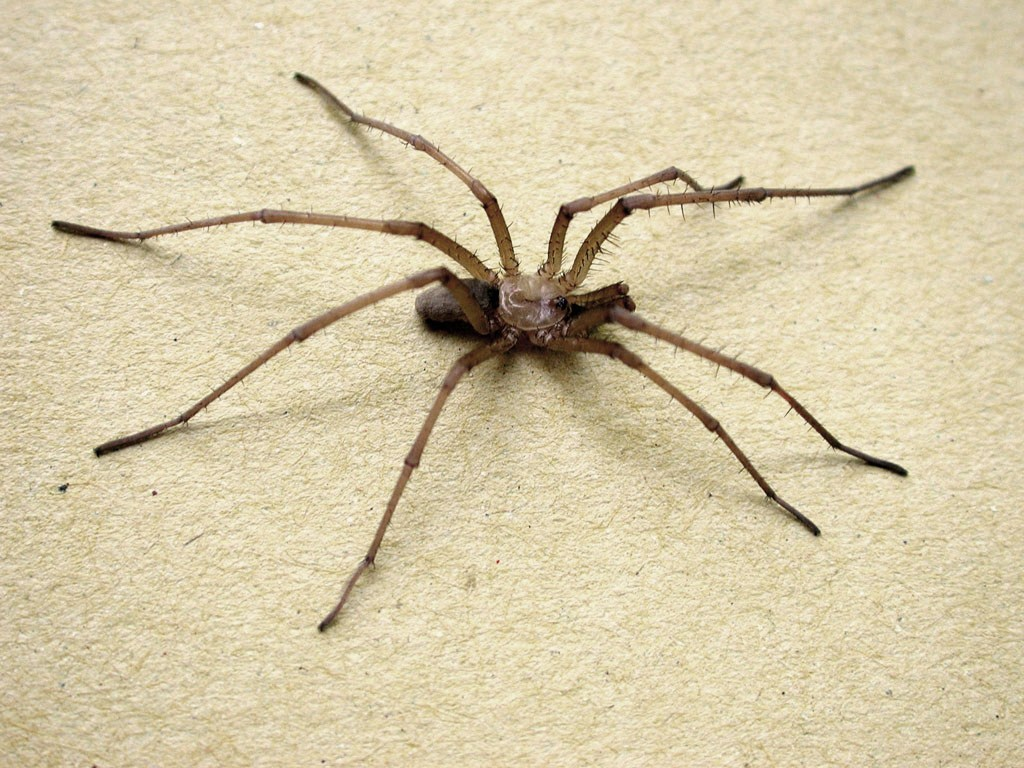
Southern house spider
(Kukulcania hibernalis), male

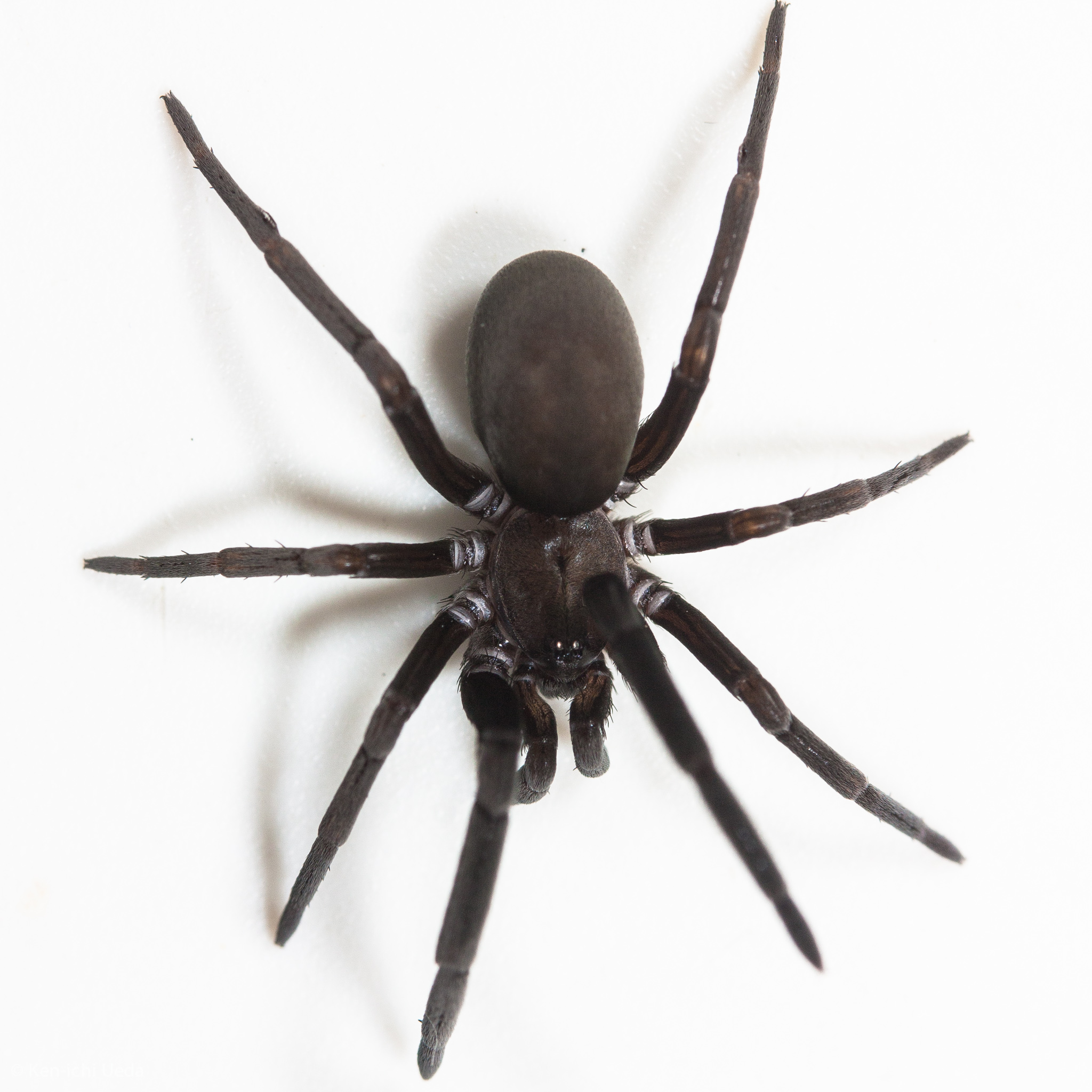
Kukulcania geophila

Kukulcania Lehtinen, 1967

- K. arizonica (Chamberlin & Ivie, 1935) — USA, Mexico
- K. bajacali Magalhaes & Ramírez, 2019 — Mexico
- K. benita Magalhaes & Ramírez, 2019 — Mexico (San Benito Is., Baja California)
- K. brignolii (Alayón, 1981) — Mexico
- K. chingona Magalhaes & Ramírez, 2019 — Mexico
- K. cochimi Magalhaes & Ramírez, 2019 — Mexico
- K. geophila (Chamberlin & Ivie, 1935) — USA, Mexico
- K. gertschi Magalhaes & Ramírez, 2019 — Mexico
- K. hibernalis (Hentz, 1842) (type) — USA, Mexico, Central America, Caribbean, South America. Introduced to Canary Is., Liberia
- K. hurca (Chamberlin & Ivie, 1942) — USA, Mexico
- K. mexicana Magalhaes & Ramírez, 2019 — Mexico
- K. santosi Magalhaes & Ramírez, 2019 — Mexico, El Salvador, Nicaragua, Costa Rica. Probably introduced in Peru, Chile
- K. tequila Magalhaes & Ramírez, 2019 — Mexico
- K. tractans (O. Pickard-Cambridge, 1896) — Mexico
- K. utahana (Chamberlin & Ivie, 1935) — USA, Mexico

== L ==
=== Labahitha ===
Labahitha Zonstein, Marusik & Magalhaes, 2017

- Labahitha fuscata (Nakatsudi, 1943) – Japan (Ogasawara Is.), Brunei, Papua New Guinea, Australia (Queensland), New Caledonia, Palau, Marshall Is., Micronesia, Fiji
- Labahitha garciai (Simon, 1892) – Seychelles, Singapore, Malaysia (Borneo), Philippines, Papua New Guinea
- Labahitha gibsonhilli (Savory, 1943) – Australia (Christmas Is.)
- Labahitha incerta Magalhaes, Berry, Koh & Gray, 2022 – Australia (Queensland)
- Labahitha insularis (Thorell, 1891) – India (Nicobar Is.)
- Labahitha littoralis (Roewer, 1938) – Indonesia (New Guinea)
- Labahitha marginata (Kishida, 1936) – Taiwan, Philippines, Papua New Guinea, Pacifi Is. Introduced to Mexico, Central America, Brazil
- Labahitha nicobarensis (Tikader, 1977) – India (Andaman Is., Nicobar Is.)
- Labahitha oonopiformis (Bristowe, 1938) (type) – Malaysia (Peninsula)
- Labahitha platnicki Magalhaes, Berry, Koh & Gray, 2022 – Papua New Guinea (Bismarck Is.), New Caledonia
- Labahitha ryukyuensis (Ono, 2013) – Japan (Ryukyu Is.)
- Labahitha sundaica (Kulczyński, 1908) – Indonesia (Java)

=== Lihuelistata ===
Lihuelistata Ramírez & Grismado, 1997

- L. metamerica (Mello-Leitão, 1940) (type) — Argentina

== M ==
=== Microfilistata ===
Microfilistata Zonstein, 1990

- M. magalhaesi Zamani & Marusik, 2018 — Iran
- M. ovchinnikovi Zonstein, 2009 — Turkmenistan
- M. tyshchenkoi Zonstein, 1990 (type) — Tajikistan

== P ==
=== Pholcoides ===
Pholcoides Roewer, 1960

- P. afghana Roewer, 1960 (type) — Afghanistan
- P. chiardolae (Caporiacco, 1934) — Pakistan, India
- P. erebus Lin & Li, 2022 — China
- P. monticola (Spassky, 1941) — Tajikistan
- P. seclusa (O. Pickard-Cambridge, 1885) — India

=== Pikelinia ===
Pikelinia Mello-Leitão, 1946

- Pikelinia aikewara (Brescovit, Magalhaes & Cizauskas, 2016) – Brazil
- Pikelinia arenicola Lise, Ferreira & Silva, 2010 – Brazil
- Pikelinia brevipes (Keyserling, 1883) – Peru
- Pikelinia carajas (Brescovit, Magalhaes & Cizauskas, 2016) – Brazil
- Pikelinia colloncura Ramírez & Grismado, 1997 – Argentina
- Pikelinia fasciata (Banks, 1902) – Ecuador (Galapagos Is.)
- Pikelinia jaminawa (Grismado & Ramírez, 2000) – Peru, Bolivia, Brazil
- Pikelinia kiliani Müller, 1987 – Colombia
- Pikelinia kolla Ramírez & Grismado, 1997 – Argentina
- Pikelinia mahuell Ramírez & Grismado, 1997 – Argentina
- Pikelinia mendensis (Mello-Leitão, 1920) – Brazil, Paraguay, Argentina
- Pikelinia milloti (Zapfe, 1961) – Chile
- Pikelinia pallida (Brescovit, Magalhaes & Cizauskas, 2016) – Brazil
- Pikelinia patagonica (Mello-Leitão, 1938) – Argentina
- Pikelinia puna Ramírez & Grismado, 1997 – Argentina
- Pikelinia roigi Ramírez & Grismado, 1997 – Argentina
- Pikelinia tambilloi (Mello-Leitão, 1941) (type) – Argentina
- Pikelinia ticucho Ramírez & Grismado, 1997 – Argentina
- Pikelinia uspallata Grismado, 2003 – Argentina

=== Pritha ===
Pritha

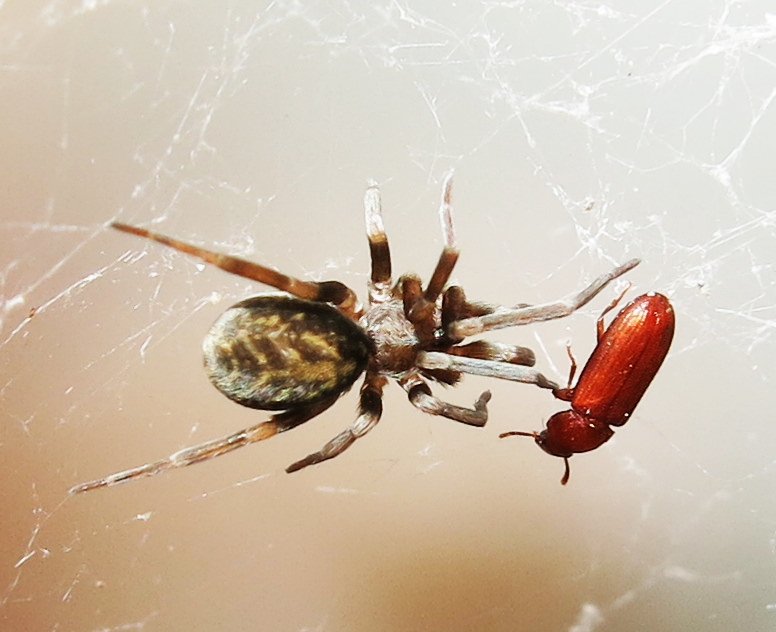
Pritha garfieldi

Pritha Lehtinen, 1967

- P. albimaculata (O. Pickard-Cambridge, 1872) — Israel
- P. ampulla Wang, 1987 — China
- P. beijingensis Song, 1986 — China
- P. condita (O. Pickard-Cambridge, 1873) — Azores, St. Helena
- P. crosbyi (Spassky, 1938) — Azerbaijan, Kazakhstan, Central Asia
- P. debilis (Simon, 1911) — Algeria
- P. dharmakumarsinhjii Patel, 1978 — India
- P. garfieldi Marusik & Zamani, 2015 — Iran
- P. hirsuta (O. Pickard-Cambridge, 1872) — Israel
- P. nana (Simon, 1868) (type) — Mediterranean, India
- P. napadensis (Patel, 1975) — India
- P. pallida (Kulczyński, 1897) — Madeira, Portugal, Italy, Croatia, Greece, Georgia
- P. parva Legittimo, Simeon, Di Pompeo & Kulczycki, 2017 — France, Italy, Switzerland, Bulgaria
- P. poonaensis (Tikader, 1963) — India
- P. sagittata Legittimo, Simeon, Di Pompeo & Kulczycki, 2017 — Italy, Switzerland, Croatia
- P. spinula Wang, 1987 — China
- P. tenuispina (Strand, 1914) — Israel
- P. vestita (Simon, 1873) — France (Corsica), Bulgaria
- P. zebrata (Thorell, 1895) — Myanmar

== S ==
=== Sahastata ===
Sahastata

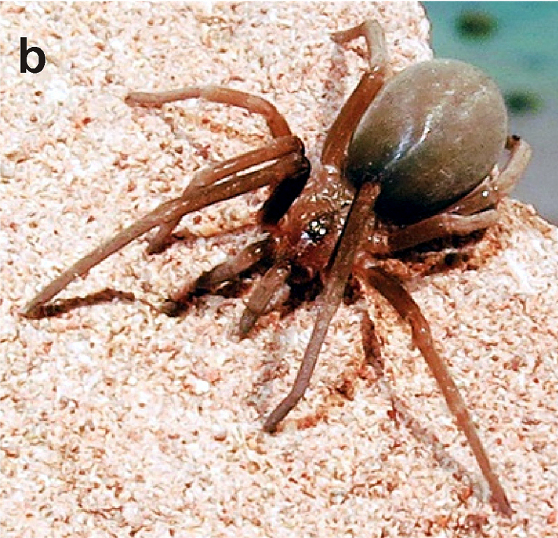
Sahastata sinuspersica, female

Sahastata Benoit, 1968

- Sahastata amethystina Marusik & Zamani, 2016 – Iran
- Sahastata aravaensis (Ganem, Magalhaes, Zonstein & Gavish-Regev, 2022) – Israel, Jordan
- Sahastata ashapuriae Patel, 1978 – India
- Sahastata bosmansi Zonstein & Marusik, 2019 – Algeria
- Sahastata infuscata (Kulczyński, 1901) – Eritrea
- Sahastata nigra (Simon, 1897) (type) – Mediterranean to India
- Sahastata sabaea Brignoli, 1982 – Yemen
- Sahastata sinuspersica Marusik, Zamani & Mirshamsi, 2014 – Iran
- Sahastata wesolowskae Magalhaes, Stockmann, Marusik & Zonstein, 2020 – Oman
- Sahastata wunderlichi Magalhaes, Stockmann, Marusik & Zonstein, 2020 – Morocco

== T ==
=== Tricalamus ===
Tricalamus Wang, 1987

- T. albidulus Wang, 1987 — China
- T. biyun Zhang, Chen & Zhu, 2009 — China
- T. gansuensis Wang & Wang, 1992 — China
- T. jiangxiensis Li, 1994 — China
- T. lindbergi (Roewer, 1962) — Afghanistan
- T. linzhiensis Hu, 2001 — China
- T. longimaculatus Wang, 1987 — China
- T. longiventris (Yaginuma, 1967) — Japan
- T. menglaensis Wang, 1987 — China
- T. meniscatus Wang, 1987 — China
- T. papilionaceus Wang, 1987 — China
- T. papillatus Wang, 1987 — China
- T. tarimuensis (Hu & Wu, 1989) — China
- T. tetragonius Wang, 1987 (type) — China
- T. xianensis Wang & Wang, 1992 — China
- T. xizanensis (Hu, Hu & Li, 1987) — China

== W ==
=== Wandella ===
Wandella Gray, 1994

- W. alinjarra Gray, 1994 — Australia (Northern Territory)
- W. australiensis (L. Koch, 1873) — Australia (Queensland)
- W. barbarella Gray, 1994 (type) — Australia (Western Australia)
- W. centralis Gray, 1994 — Australia (Western Australia, Northern Territory, South Australia)
- W. diamentina Gray, 1994 — Australia (Queensland, South Australia)
- W. grayi Magalhaes, 2016 — Australia (Queensland)
- W. infernalis Magalhaes, 2016 — Australia (Western Australia)
- W. loloata Magalhaes, Berry, Koh & Gray, 2022 — Papua New Guinea
- W. murrayensis Gray, 1994 — Australia (South Australia, New South Wales, Victoria, Western Australia)
- W. orana Gray, 1994 — Australia (New South Wales, Queensland)
- W. pallida Gray, 1994 — Australia (Western Australia)
- W. parnabyi Gray, 1994 — Australia (Western Australia, Northern Territory)
- W. stuartensis Gray, 1994 — Australia (Western Australia, South Australia, New South Wales, Queensland)
- W. waldockae Gray, 1994 — Australia (Western Australia)

== Y ==
=== Yardiella ===
Yardiella Gray, 1994

- Y. humphreysi Gray, 1994 (type) — Australia (Western Australia)

== Z ==
=== Zaitunia ===
Zaitunia

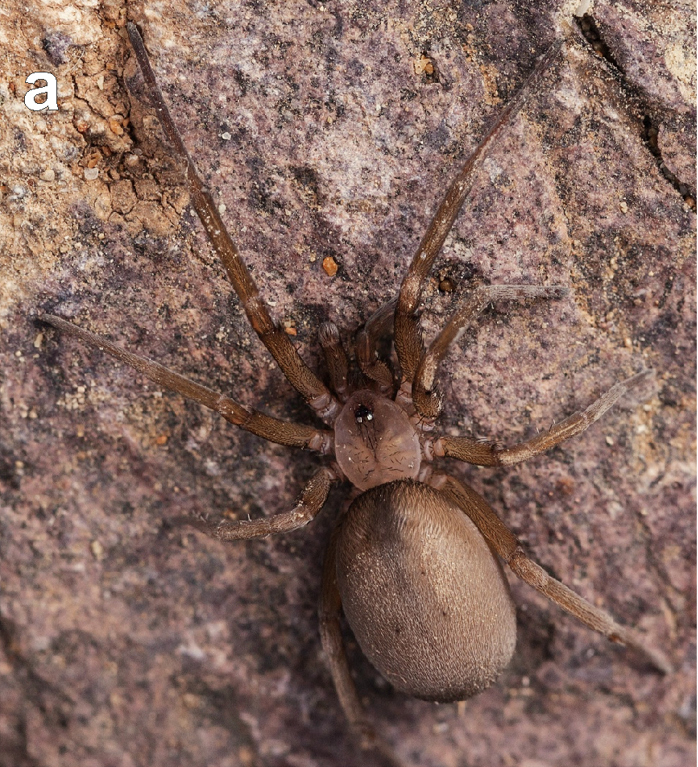
Zaitunia akhanii

Zaitunia Lehtinen, 1967

- Z. afghana (Roewer, 1962) — Afghanistan
- Z. akhanii Marusik & Zamani, 2015 — Iran
- Z. alexandri Brignoli, 1982 — Iran
- Z. annulipes (Kulczyński, 1908) — Cyprus
- Z. arabica Marusik & Zonstein, 2023 — United Arab Emirates
- Z. beshkentica (Andreeva & Tystshenko, 1969) — Tajikistan
- Z. brignoliana Zonstein & Marusik, 2016 — Iran
- Z. darreshurii Zamani & Marusik, 2018 — Iran
- Z. ferghanensis Zonstein & Marusik, 2016 — Kyrgyzstan, Uzbekistan
- Z. feti Zonstein & Marusik, 2016 — Turkmenistan
- Z. halepensis Zonstein & Marusik, 2016 — Syria
- Z. huberi Zonstein & Marusik, 2016 — Afghanistan
- Z. inderensis Ponomarev, 2005 — Kazakhstan
- Z. kerkyra Lecigne, 2023 — Greece
- Z. kunti Zonstein & Marusik, 2016 — Cyprus, Turkey
- Z. logunovi Zonstein & Marusik, 2016 — Kazakhstan, Kyrgyzstan
- Z. maracandica (Charitonov, 1946) — Uzbekistan
- Z. martynovae (Andreeva & Tystshenko, 1969) — Tajikistan
- Z. medica Brignoli, 1982 — Iran
- Z. minoica Zonstein & Marusik, 2016 — Greece (Crete)
- Z. minuta Zonstein & Marusik, 2016 — Uzbekistan
- Z. persica Brignoli, 1982 — Iran
- Z. psammodroma Zonstein & Marusik, 2016 — Turkmenistan
- Z. rufa (Caporiacco, 1934) — Pakistan, India
- Z. schmitzi (Kulczyński, 1911) (type) — Egypt, Israel
- Z. spinimana Zonstein & Marusik, 2016 — Kazakhstan, Turkmenistan
- Z. vahabzadehi Zamani & Marusik, 2016 — Iran
- Z. wunderlichi Zonstein & Marusik, 2016 — Kyrgyzstan
- Z. zagrosica Zamani & Marusik, 2018 — Iran
- Z. zonsteini Fomichev & Marusik, 2013 — Kazakhstan
