= Berta Sofía Gerschman =

Argentine arachnologist (1905–1977)

- Born: 28 June 1905; Carlos Casares, Buenos Aires, Argentina
- Died: 29 June 1977 (aged 72); Buenos Aires, Argentina
- Occupation: Arachnologist
- Years active: 1929–1977
- Employer: Bernardino Rivadavia Natural Sciences Argentine Museum
- Known for: Scientific partnership with Rita Delia Schiapelli

Berta Sofía Gerschman de Pikelin (28 June 1905 – 29 June 1977) was an Argentine arachnologist who, alongside Rita Delia Schiapelli, was among the first female arachnid specialists in South America, and formed one of the most notable female arachnology teams in Argentina for over forty years.

== Biography ==
Gerschman was born in Carlos Casares in Buenos Aires. Gerschman was the daughter of José Gerschman and Manuela Pelman, who were both of Russian descent. She studied at the Instituto Superior del Profesorado Dr. Joaquín V. González, where she qualified as a secondary school teacher of natural sciences in 1928. Gerschman was a student of Irene Bernasconi, the first echinoderm specialist in Argentina and a prominent researcher at the Bernardino Rivadavia Natural Sciences Argentine Museum.

In 1929, Gerschman joined the entomology department at the MACN, where she began working alongside Schiapelli with spider specimens provided by Emilio Gemignani at the suggestion of the museum's director, Martín Doello Jurado. Using books and materials from the collection of the La Plata Museum, Gerschman and Schiapelli classified and catalogued spider specimens, as well as classifying the material, cataloguing it and incorporating into MACN's collection. These specimens became the foundation of the National Collection of Arachnology at MACN. Gerschman and Schiapelli primarily studied spiders from the suborder Mygalomorphae, such as tarantulas, discovering and describing new genera and species of spiders. Two genera and twelve species of spiders were named after them in recognition of their academic work. Gerschman and Schiapelli were described as the "Lennon and McCartney of River Plate arachnology".

In the 1930s, Gerschman and Schiapelli started a correspondence with Brazilian arachnologist Cândido Firmino de Mello-Leitão. In 1937, they travelled to Rio de Janeiro at the invitation of de Mello-Leitão to improve their knowledge of arachnid classification. In 1937, Schiapelli was offered a job as keeper of the arachnology collection as a paid position. Having previously volunteered, Schiapelli and Gerschman agreed to split the role between them.

In 1962, Gerschman and Schiapelli joined the Scientific Research Programme of the National Council for Scientific and Technical Research, where they trained several scientists who went on to become noted arachnologists.

Gerschman and Schiapelli presented their research at various meetings, including for the Argentine Association of Natural Sciences, the Argentine Entomological Society, the Argentine Zoological Meetings, the Latin-South American Zoological Congress and the IV International Congress of Arachnology. In 1960 and 1968, Gerschman and Schiapelli made trips to the United States and Europe to study specimens of neotropical spiders, visiting the collections of the National Museum of Natural History in Paris, the British Museum in London, and the American Museum of Natural History in New York City.

Gerschman died in Buenos Aires on 29 June 1977.

== Publications ==
Gerschman published 53 articles on Argentine arachnids.

== Tributes ==
The following genera and species were named after Gerschman:

- Family Filistatidae, genus Pikelinia, Mello-Leitão, 1946
- Family Actinopodidae, species Actinopus gerschiapeliarum, Ríos-Tamayo and Goloboff, 2018
- Family Amaurobiidae, species Yacolla pikelinae, Lehtinen, 1967
- Family Bothuriuridae, species Bothriurus bertae, Abalos, 1955
- Family Anyphaenidae, species Axyracrus gerschmanae, Mello-Leitão, 1938
- Family Salticidae, species Scopocira pikelinae, Galiano, 1958
- Family Theraphosidae, species Cyriocosmus bertae, Pérez-Miles, 1998
- Family Thomisidae, species Misumenoides gerschmanae, Mello-Leitão, 1944
