= Sahastata wesolowskae =

Scientific classification
- Kingdom: Animalia
- Phylum: Arthropoda
- Subphylum: Chelicerata
- Class: Arachnida
- Order: Araneae
- Infraorder: Araneomorphae
- Family: Filistatidae
- Genus: Sahastata
- Species: S. wesolowskae

Binomial name
- Sahastata wesolowskae Magalhaes, Stockmann, Marusik & Zonstein, 2020

Species of crevice weaver spider

Sahastata wesolowskae is a species of crevice weaver in the genus Sahastata that lives in Oman. The spider lives in areas with little water, mainly hydrating through the prey it eats. It was first described in 2020 by Ivan Magalhaes, Mark Stockmann, Yuri Marusik and Sergei Zonstein. The spider is small, with a carapace that is between 1.67 and 3.36 mm (0.066 and 0.132 in) long and an abdomen that is between 3.73 and 4.94 mm (0.147 and 0.194 in) long. The females are larger than the male, mature more quickly, are darker in color and have a more rounded abdomen. Both have a V-shaped pattern towards the middle of the carapace, but it is clearer on the female. A female will often eat its mate after mating. The male has a long and slightly bent embolus. The female has an endogyne with distinctive spermathecae. It is these copulatory organs that most clearly differentiate the species from other spiders in the genus.

== Taxonomy ==
Sahastata wesolowskae species of crevice weaver that was first described by the arachnologists Ivan Magalhaes, Mark Stockmann, Yuri Marusik and Sergei Zonstein in 2020. The species is named after the Polish arachnologist Wanda Wesołowska. It was placed in the genus Sahastata, raised by Pierre L.G. Benoit in 1968. The genus is a member of the subfamily Filistatinae in the family Filistatidae, which are known as crevice weaver spiders. The genus is related to Kukulcania, differing in details like the design of the second tarsal claw. The species is most related to Sahastata nigra, and then to Sahastata wunderlichi. DNA sequencing has also determined that it is closely related to Sahastata aravaensis. The holotype is stored at the Steinhardt Museum of Natural History in Tel Aviv.

== Description ==
Sahastata wesolowskae is generally a medium to large spider, but examples vary greatly in size. The male has a total length that ranges between 3.32 and 5.98 mm (0.131 and 0.235 in) while the female is larger between 8.17 and 15.3 mm (0.322 and 0.602 in) long. The spider has a rounded forward section, or cephalothorax, and, behind that, a abdomen.

The male is generally yellowish cream. Its carapace, the hard upper side of its cephalothorax, that is between 1.67 and 3.08 mm (0.066 and 0.121 in) long and typically 2.53 mm (0.100 in) wide, is darker around the spider's eyes and has an indistinct brown V-shaped pattern towards the middle. The rear of the underside of its cephalothorax, or sternum, has white markings. Its chelicerae have a small front tooth.

Its abdomen is typically 3.73 mm (0.147 in) long and 1.87 mm (0.074 in) wide. It is elongated, brown and hairy. The legs are brown and yellow. It has distinctive copulatory organs. Its palpal bulb has a femur that is about twice as long as the carapace and a cymbium twice as long as its palpal bulb. Its embolus is long with a slightly bent end.

The female of the species is generally light brown and very different morphologically compared to the male. Its carapace, which has a clearer brown V-shaped pattern, is typically 3.36 mm (0.132 in) long and 2.56 mm (0.101 in) wide. Its abdomen is larger and more spherical than the male, and has a pattern reminiscent of a river delta. It has a typical length of 4.94 mm (0.194 in) and a width of 3.13 mm (0.123 in). Its legs are generally brown with yellow ends. Its endogyne has spermathecae that have an area shaped like a boomerang, surrounded by a long portion that has a membrane.

The spider can be distinguished from other spiders in the genus by its copulatory organs. The spider is similar to the related Sahastata nigra. The male differs in having a longer and more sinuous embolus that has distinctive ridges. The species can also be distinguished from Sahastata sinuspersica by the way that its palpal bulb gently tapers at the end. The structure of the epigyne differentiates the female from the other species. Compared to Sahastata sabaea, the spider has a more rounded and shorter glandular portion and a larger base to its spermathecae.

== Behaviour ==
As well as being resistant to extremes of temperature, Sahastata wesolowskae thrives in areas which lack water. The mainly get hydration via their prey. The females are less discriminatory on who they mate with than other species in the genus. They build their eggs three months after mating, each egg sac containing typically 169 juveniles. The juveniles are predominantly female, representing about 20 percent of the younger population. Although the males mature more quickly, the females also have a generally longer lifespan. After mating, the female will often eat the male in preference to other prey.

== Distribution and habitat ==
Sahastata spiders mainly live in an area that stretches across North Africa and Arabia. Sahastata wesolowskae is endemic to Oman. The holotype was found near Salalah in the Dhofar Governorate in 2016. Other examples have been found in Al Wusta and near Thumrait. The examples are generally found in flat sandy environments that have limited vegetation. This is typical of the genus, which generally live far from human habitation. The spider can be negatively impacted by oil spills, its preferred habitats being particularly vulnerable to pollution.
