= Rita Delia Schiapelli =

Argentine arachnologist (1906–1976)

Rita Delia Esther Schiapelli
- Born: November 20, 1906; Moreno, Argentina
- Died: December 23, 1976 (aged 70); Buenos Aires, Argentina
- Scientific career
- Fields: Arachnology
- Workplaces: Museo Argentino de Ciencias Naturales

Rita Delia Esther Schiapelli (November 20, 1906 – December 23, 1976) was an Argentine arachnologist.

== Biography ==
Rita D. E. Schiapelli was the daughter of Antonio Schiapelli (Italian) and Pía Sánchez (Argentine). She studied at the Instituto Superior del Profesorado “Joaquín V. González”, together with Berta Sofía Gerschman de Pikelin. Both were students of Irene Bernasconi, Argentina’s first specialist in Echinodermata, who worked at the Museo Argentino de Ciencias Naturales. In 1928 they graduated together as secondary school teachers in natural sciences, and in 1929 they began working voluntarily in the museum’s entomology section. Using books and specimens from the Museo de La Plata, they classified and catalogued spiders provided by the head of the section. These spiders became the first specimens of the National Arachnology Collection of the Museo Argentino de Ciencias Naturales.

They mainly studied spiders of the suborder Mygalomorphae, commonly known as tarantulas. Together they described new genera and species of spiders from various families. Two genera and twelve species of spiders were also named in their honor. In academic circles they were known as “the Lennon and McCartney of Río de la Plata arachnology.”

In the 1930s, the two arachnologists exchanged letters and documents with Brazilian arachnologist Cândido Firmino de Mello-Leitão. In 1937 they traveled to Rio de Janeiro, Brazil, at Mello-Leitão’s invitation, to further their specialization in arachnid classification. That same year, Schiapelli was appointed curator of the Arachnology Collection at the Museo Argentino de Ciencias Naturales, a paid position. Since both had worked as volunteers until then, they agreed to share the responsibility and the salary, alternating attendance at the museum. On January 10, 1952, the Arachnology Section of the museum was formally created, with Schiapelli as its first head.

In 1962, Gerschman de Pikelin and Schiapelli joined the research career track of the CONICET as researchers.

== Honors ==
The spider Pikelinia schiapelliae (family Filistatidae) was named in her honor.

== Publications ==
She published 53 articles on arachnids of Argentina, including:

- Schiapelli, R.D. & Gerschman de Pikelin, B.S. (1942). "Arañas argentinas (parte I)." Anales del Museo Argentino de Ciencias Naturales "Bernardino Rivadavia" 40: 317–332.
- Schiapelli, R.D. & Gerschman de Pikelin, B.S. (1945). "Parte descriptiva." In: Vellard, J., R.D. Schiapelli & B.S. Gerschman (eds.) Arañas sudamericanas colleccionadas por el Doctor J. Vellard. I. Theraphosidae nuevas o poco conocidas. Acta Zoologica Lilloana 3: 165–213.
- Schiapelli, R.D. & Gerschman de Pikelin, B.S. (1961). "Las especies del género Grammostola Simon 1892, en la República Argentina (Araneae, Theraphosidae)." Actas y Trabajos del Congreso Sudamericano de Zoologia, La Plata I (La Plata, 1959) 3: 199–208.
