= Tutaibo =

Scientific classification
- Kingdom: Animalia
- Phylum: Arthropoda
- Subphylum: Chelicerata
- Class: Arachnida
- Order: Araneae
- Infraorder: Araneomorphae
- Family: Linyphiidae
- Genus: Tutaibo; Chamberlin, 1916

Type species
- T. debilipes Chamberlin, 1916

Species
- 10, see text

Synonyms
- Caporiacconia Racenis, 1955

Genus of spiders

Tutaibo is a genus of sheet weavers that was first described by Ralph Vary Chamberlin in 1916.

== Species ==
As of June 2019 it contains ten species:

- Tutaibo anglicanus (Hentz, 1850) – USA
- Tutaibo debilipes Chamberlin, 1916 (type) – Peru
- Tutaibo formosus Millidge, 1991 – Peru
- Tutaibo fucosus (Keyserling, 1891) – Brazil
- Tutaibo niger (O. Pickard-Cambridge, 1882) – Brazil
- Tutaibo phoeniceus (O. Pickard-Cambridge, 1894) – Mexico, Guatemala
- Tutaibo pullus Millidge, 1991 – Colombia
- Tutaibo rubescens Millidge, 1991 – Colombia
- Tutaibo rusticellus (Keyserling, 1891) – Brazil
- Tutaibo velox (Keyserling, 1886) – Brazil
