= Kukulcania utahana =

Scientific classification
- Kingdom: Animalia
- Phylum: Arthropoda
- Subphylum: Chelicerata
- Class: Arachnida
- Order: Araneae
- Infraorder: Araneomorphae
- Family: Filistatidae
- Genus: Kukulcania
- Species: K. utahana

Binomial name
- Kukulcania utahana (Chamberlin & Ivie, 1935)

Species of spider

Kukulcania utahana is a species of crevice weaver in the spider family Filistatidae. It is found in the United States.
