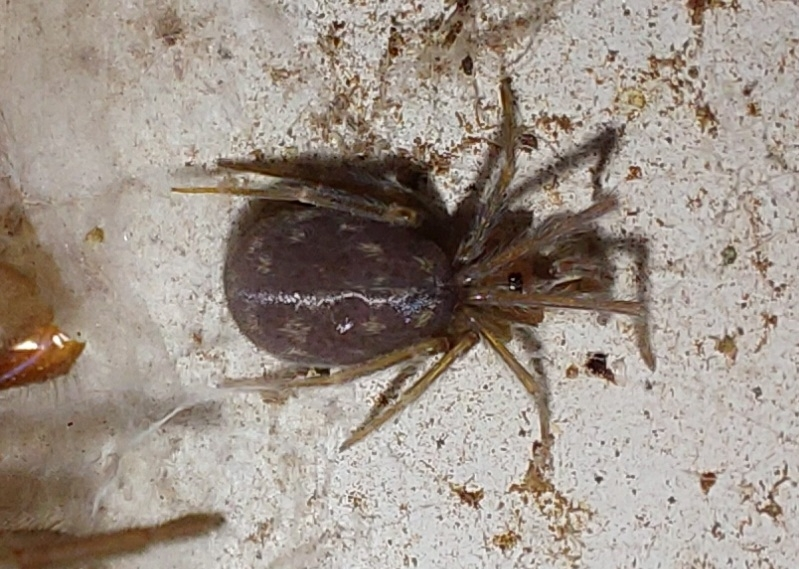

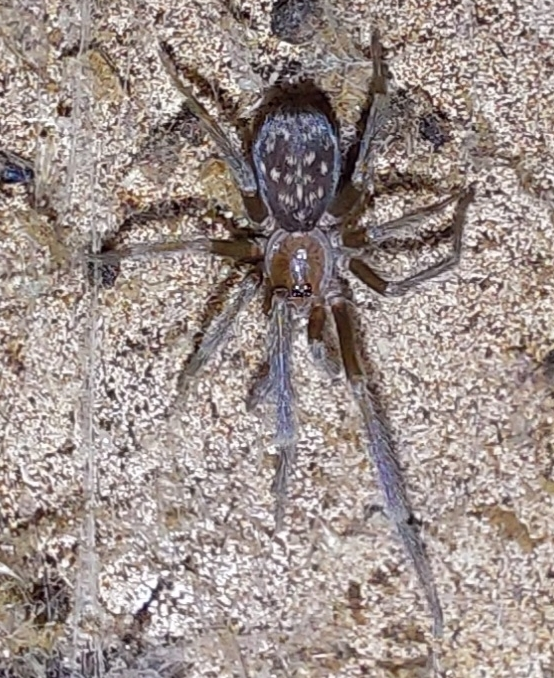

Scientific classification
- Kingdom: Animalia
- Phylum: Arthropoda
- Subphylum: Chelicerata
- Class: Arachnida
- Order: Araneae
- Infraorder: Araneomorphae
- Family: Filistatidae
- Genus: Andoharano
- Species: A. ansieae

Binomial name
- Andoharano ansieae Zonstein & Marusik, 2015

= Andoharano ansieae =

Ansie's Crevice Spider

Species of spider

Andoharano ansieae is a species of spider in the family Filistatidae. It is commonly known as Ansie's crevice spider and is endemic to southern Africa.

== Distribution ==
Andoharano ansieae is distributed across Namibia, Botswana, and South Africa. In South Africa, it has been recorded from Limpopo near Gravelotte.

== Habitat and ecology ==
In Namibia, the species has been found in webs constructed on walls, both inside and outside houses. During the day they hide under their webs or retreat into tube-like structures integrated into their catch webs, which are often spun on the edge of the web. At night they position themselves outside on the web, waiting for prey.

The sticky cribellate webs gather dust and appear untidy, with several round exit and entrance holes leading to the actual retreats. Each spider maintains its own territory and they live solitarily, although many individuals can exist under one large area of catch web on a tree or wall, forming a colony.

Webs can be observed on tree trunks, walls, old switchboards, window handles, and inside houses on decorative articles, behind foot skirting, cupboards, and on window sills. When living on trees, their retreats are constructed under bark. These spiders guard their egg sacs, which are covered loosely by a sheet.

== Conservation ==
Andoharano ansieae is listed as least concern by the South African National Biodiversity Institute due to its wide range across southern Africa. More sampling is needed in South Africa to determine its full range.

== Etymology ==
The species is named after South African arachnologist Ansie Dippenaar-Schoeman.

== Taxonomy ==
The species was originally described by Zonstein & Marusik in 2015 from the Okavango region in Namibia. It represents the first record of the genus Andoharano from mainland Africa.
