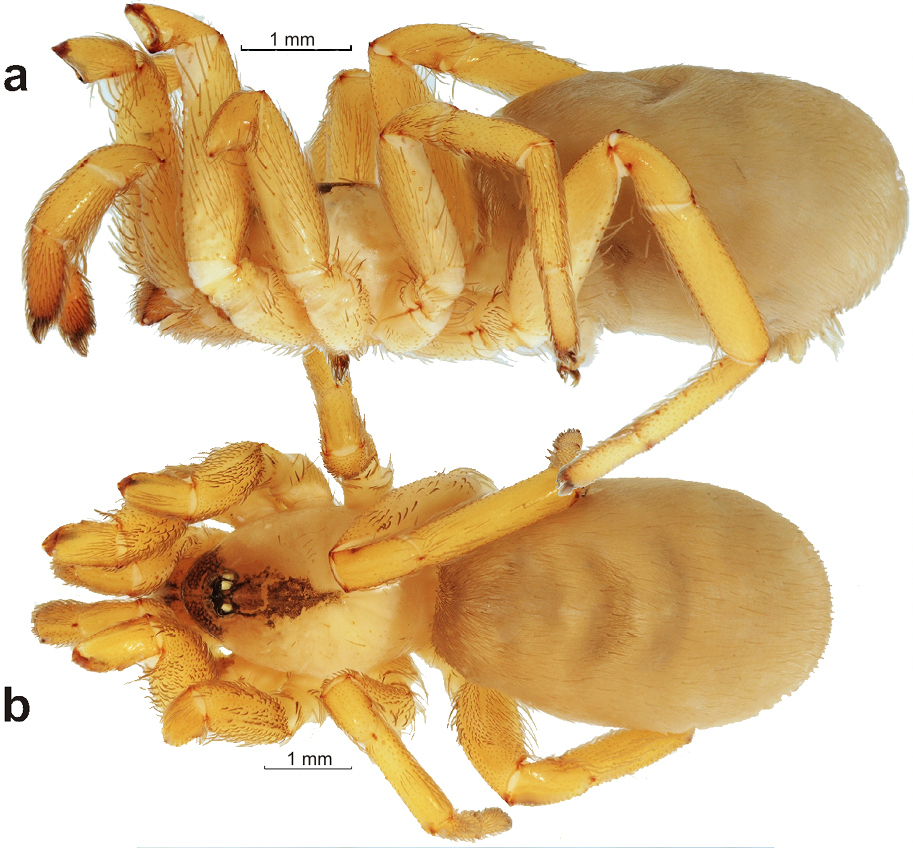

Scientific classification
- Kingdom: Animalia
- Phylum: Arthropoda
- Subphylum: Chelicerata
- Class: Arachnida
- Order: Araneae
- Infraorder: Araneomorphae
- Family: Filistatidae
- Genus: Zaitunia
- Species: Z. akhanii

Binomial name
- Zaitunia akhanii Marusik & Zamani, 2015

= Zaitunia akhanii =

Species of spider

Zaitunia akhanii is a species of the araneomorph spider family Filistatidae (crevice weaver spiders).

== Distribution ==
This species is endemic to Tehran Province, Iran.

== Description ==
The female holotype measured 5.2 mm.

== Etymology ==
This species was named after Iranian botanist Hossein Akhani.
