= Filistata maguirei =

Scientific classification
- Kingdom: Animalia
- Phylum: Arthropoda
- Subphylum: Chelicerata
- Class: Arachnida
- Order: Araneae
- Infraorder: Araneomorphae
- Family: Filistatidae
- Genus: Filistata
- Species: F. maguirei

Binomial name
- Filistata maguirei Marusik & Zamani, 2015

Species of spider

Filistata maguirei is a species of the araneomorph spider family Filistatidae.

== Distribution ==
This species is endemic to Hormozgan Province, Iran.

== Description ==
The male holotype measured 5.5 mm and the female paratype measured 9.5 mm.

== Etymology ==
This species was named after actor Tobey Maguire, who played Spider-Man in Sam Raimi's trilogy.

== See also ==
- List of organisms named after famous people (born 1975–present)
