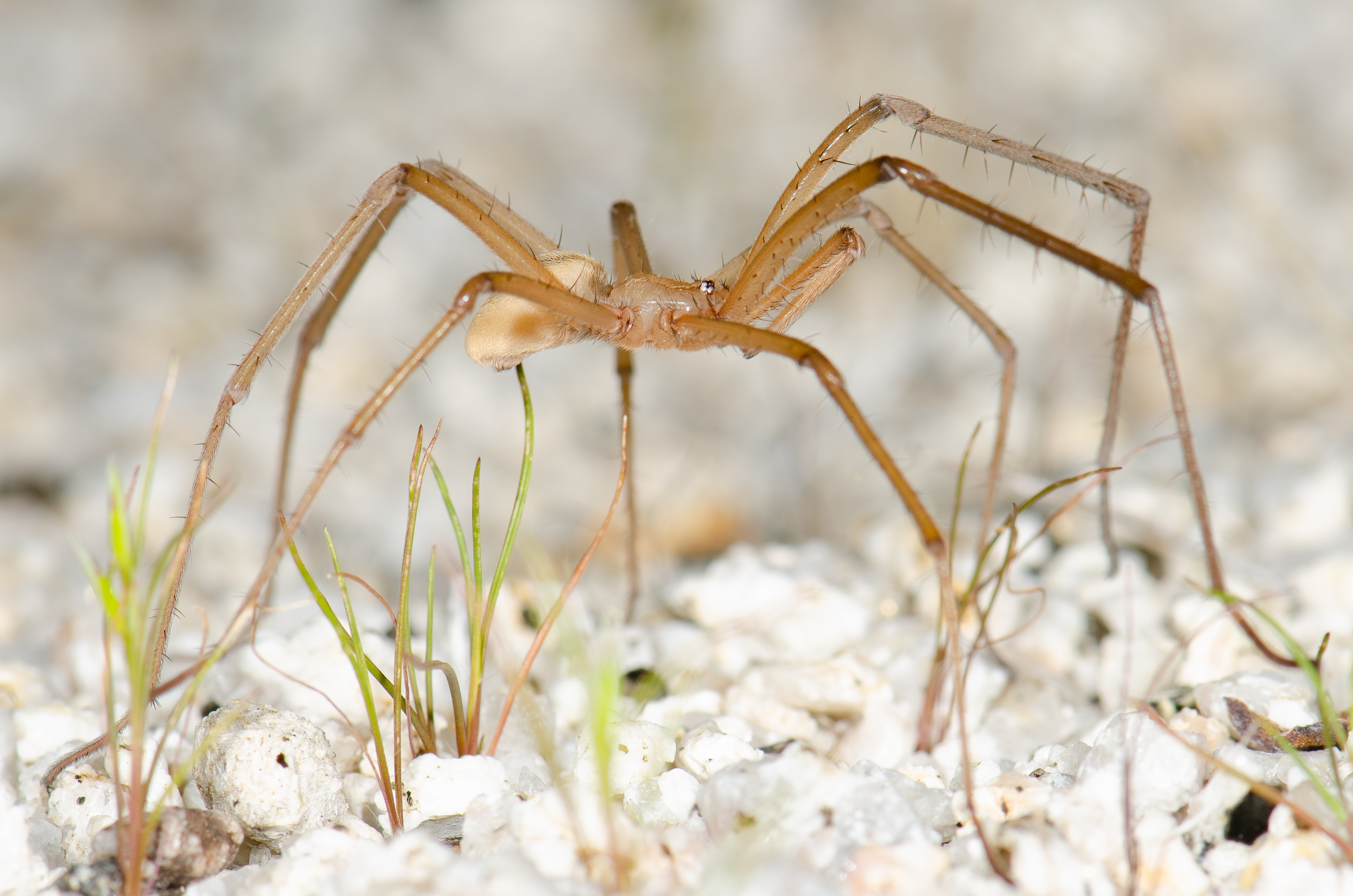

Scientific classification
- Kingdom: Animalia
- Phylum: Arthropoda
- Subphylum: Chelicerata
- Class: Arachnida
- Order: Araneae
- Infraorder: Araneomorphae
- Family: Filistatidae
- Genus: Kukulcania
- Species: K. hurca

Binomial name
- Kukulcania hurca (Chamberlin & Ivie, 1942)

= Kukulcania hurca =

Species of spider

Kukulcania hurca is a species of crevice weaver in the spider family Filistatidae. It is found in the United States.
