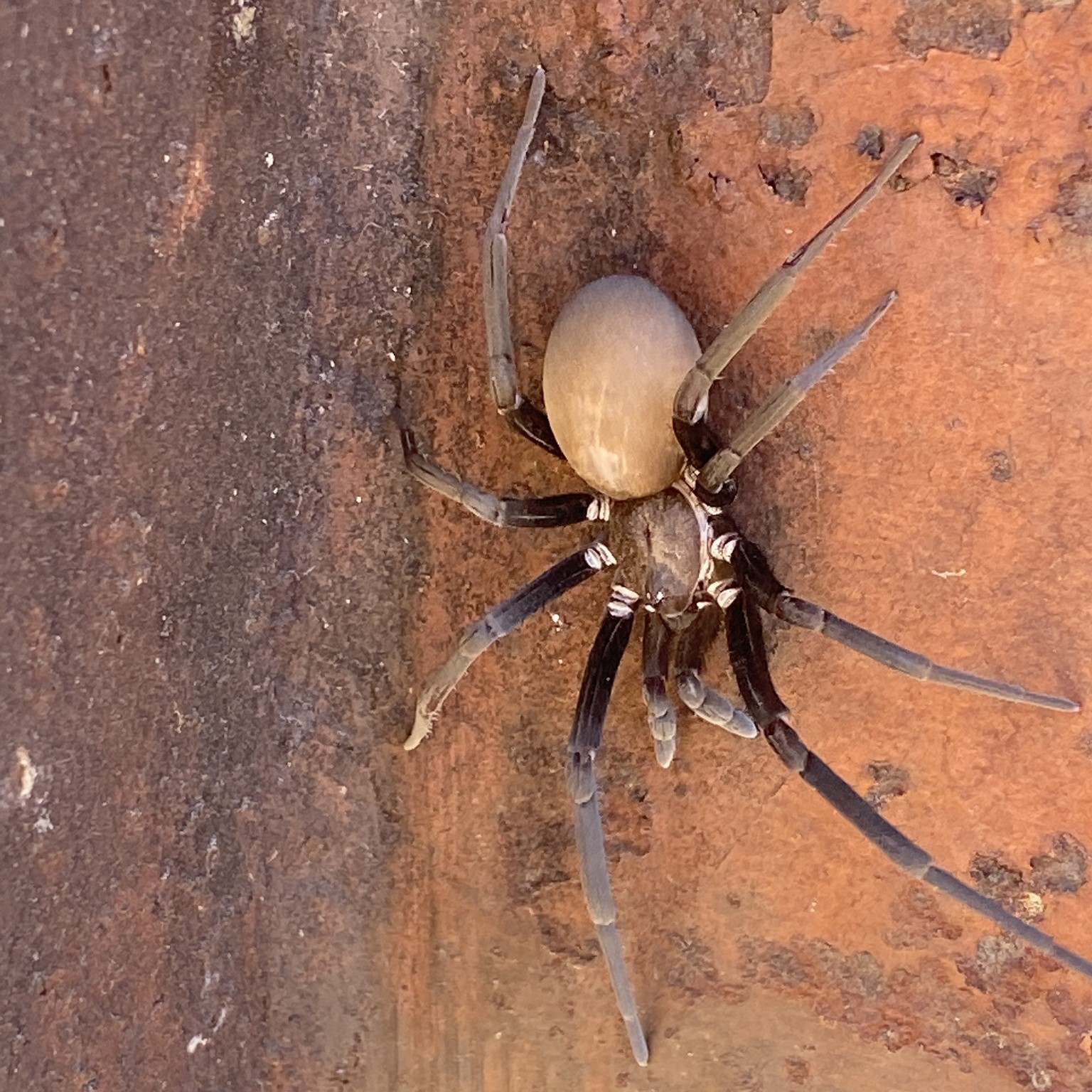

Scientific classification
- Kingdom: Animalia
- Phylum: Arthropoda
- Subphylum: Chelicerata
- Class: Arachnida
- Order: Araneae
- Infraorder: Araneomorphae
- Family: Filistatidae
- Genus: Kukulcania
- Species: K. arizonica

Binomial name
- Kukulcania arizonica Chamberlin & Ivie, 1935

= Kukulcania arizonica =

Species of spider

Kukulcania arizonica (commonly called the Arizona black hole spider) is a species of spider, belonging to the family Filistatidae. As the scientific and common names suggest, this spider is found in Arizona, but can also be found in the neighbouring US states of New Mexico, Nevada and California.

This is a black spider with a velvety texture. It builds a silken tube in a crevice, often on the wall of a building, with silken threads radiating from the entrance. The female, around 13 mm in length (excluding legs), can live for several years. The male is dissimilar, having noticeably longer legs and a thinner body.
