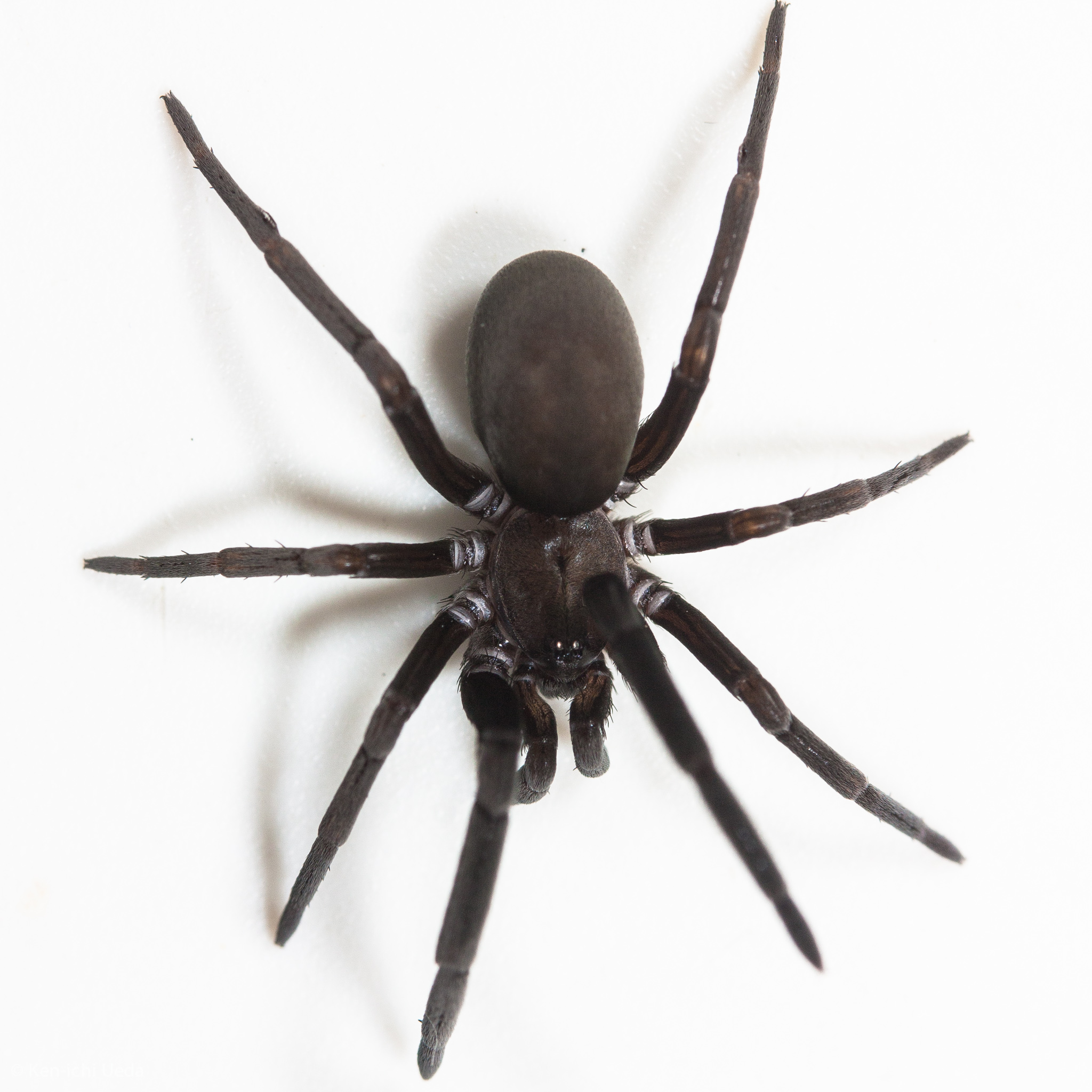

Scientific classification
- Kingdom: Animalia
- Phylum: Arthropoda
- Subphylum: Chelicerata
- Class: Arachnida
- Order: Araneae
- Infraorder: Araneomorphae
- Family: Filistatidae
- Genus: Kukulcania
- Species: K. geophila

Binomial name
- Kukulcania geophila (Chamberlin & Ivie, 1935)

= Kukulcania geophila =

Species of spider

Kukulcania geophila is a species of crevice weaver in the family of spiders known as Filistatidae. It is found in the United States and Mexico.

== Subspecies ==
These two subspecies belong to the species Kukulcania geophila:

- Kukulcania geophila geophila (Chamberlin & Ivie, 1935)^{i g}
- Kukulcania geophila wawona (Chamberlin & Ivie, 1942)^{i c g}

Data sources: i = ITIS, c = Catalogue of Life, g = GBIF, b = Bugguide.net
