= Labahitha =

Scientific classification
- Kingdom: Animalia
- Phylum: Arthropoda
- Subphylum: Chelicerata
- Class: Arachnida
- Order: Araneae
- Infraorder: Araneomorphae
- Family: Filistatidae
- Genus: Labahitha; Zonstein, Marusik & Magalhaes, 2017

Synonyms
- Mystes Bristowe, 1938

Genus of spiders

Labahitha is a genus of crevice weavers that was first described by S. L. Zonstein, Yuri M. Marusik & I. L. F. Magalhaes in 2017.

== Species ==
As of March 2022 it contains twelve species:

- Labahitha fuscata (Nakatsudi, 1943) – Japan (Ogasawara Is.), Brunei, Papua New Guinea, Australia (Queensland), New Caledonia, Palau, Marshall Is., Micronesia, Fiji
- Labahitha garciai (Simon, 1892) – Seychelles, Singapore, Malaysia (Borneo), Philippines, Papua New Guinea
- Labahitha gibsonhilli (Savory, 1943) – Australia (Christmas Is.)
- Labahitha incerta Magalhaes, Berry, Koh & Gray, 2022 – Australia (Queensland)
- Labahitha insularis (Thorell, 1891) – India (Nicobar Is.)
- Labahitha littoralis (Roewer, 1938) – Indonesia (New Guinea)
- Labahitha marginata (Kishida, 1936) – Taiwan, Philippines, Papua New Guinea, Pacifi Is. Introduced to Mexico, Central America, Brazil
- Labahitha nicobarensis (Tikader, 1977) – India (Andaman Is., Nicobar Is.)
- Labahitha oonopiformis (Bristowe, 1938) (type) – Malaysia (Peninsula)
- Labahitha platnicki Magalhaes, Berry, Koh & Gray, 2022 – Papua New Guinea (Bismarck Is.), New Caledonia
- Labahitha ryukyuensis (Ono, 2013) – Japan (Ryukyu Is.)
- Labahitha sundaica (Kulczyński, 1908) – Indonesia (Java)
