= Filistatoides =

Scientific classification
- Domain: Eukaryota
- Kingdom: Animalia
- Phylum: Arthropoda
- Subphylum: Chelicerata
- Class: Arachnida
- Order: Araneae
- Infraorder: Araneomorphae
- Family: Filistatidae
- Genus: Filistatoides; F. O. Pickard-Cambridge, 1899

Type species
- F. insignis (O. Pickard-Cambridge, 1896)

Species
- 4, see text

Genus of spiders

Filistatoides is a genus of crevice weavers that was first described by F. O. Pickard-Cambridge in 1899.

== Species ==
As of May 2019 it contains four species:

- Filistatoides insignis (O. Pickard-Cambridge, 1896) (type) – Guatemala
- Filistatoides milloti (Zapfe, 1961) – Chile
- Filistatoides polita (Franganillo, 1936) – Cuba
- Filistatoides xichu Brescovit, Sánchez-Ruiz & Alayón, 2016 – Mexico
