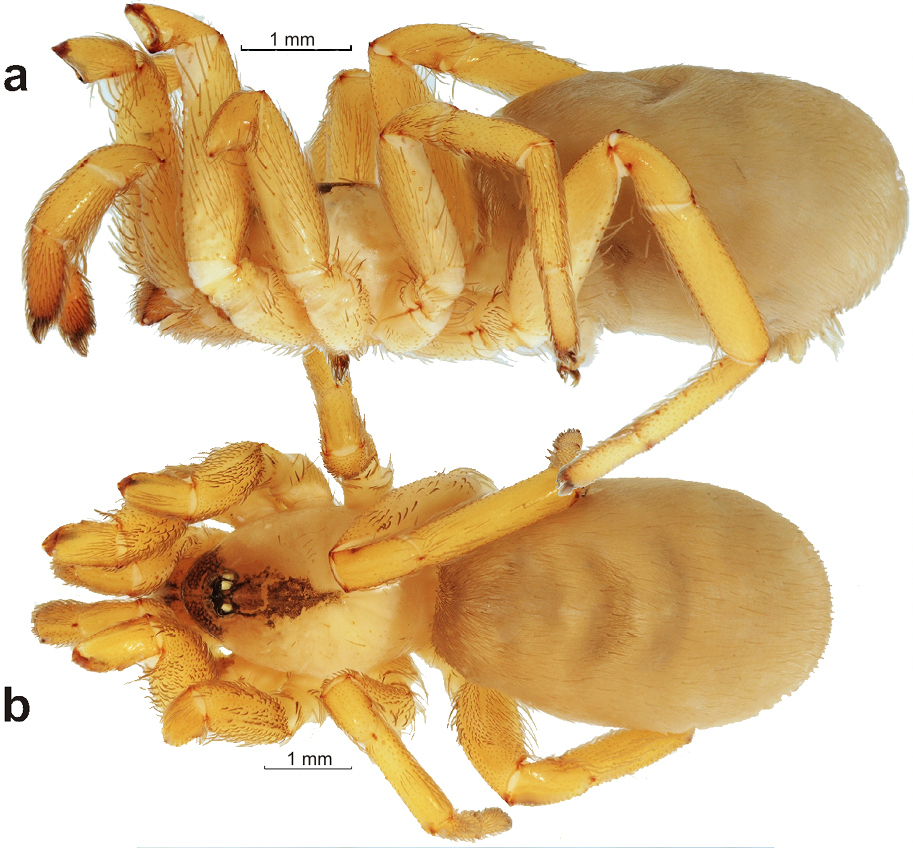
- Holotype of Zaitunia akhanii

Scientific classification
- Kingdom: Animalia
- Phylum: Arthropoda
- Subphylum: Chelicerata
- Class: Arachnida
- Order: Araneae
- Infraorder: Araneomorphae
- Family: Filistatidae
- Genus: Zaitunia; Lehtinen, 1967

Type species
- Z. schmitzi (Kulczyński, 1911)

Species
- 28, see text

= Zaitunia =

Genus of spiders

Zaitunia is a genus of crevice weavers that was first described by Pekka T. Lehtinen in 1967.

== Species ==
As of September 2022 it contains 28 species:

- Zaitunia afghana (Roewer, 1962) – Afghanistan
- Zaitunia akhanii Marusik & Zamani, 2015 – Iran
- Zaitunia alexandri Brignoli, 1982 – Iran
- Zaitunia annulipes (Kulczyński, 1908) – Cyprus
- Zaitunia beshkentica (Andreeva & Tyschchenko, 1969) – Tajikistan
- Zaitunia brignoliana Zonstein & Marusik, 2016 – Iran
- Zaitunia darreshurii Zamani & Marusik, 2018 – Iran
- Zaitunia ferghanensis Zonstein & Marusik, 2016 – Kyrgyzstan, Uzbekistan
- Zaitunia feti Zonstein & Marusik, 2016 – Turkmenistan
- Zaitunia halepensis Zonstein & Marusik, 2016 – Syria
- Zaitunia huberi Zonstein & Marusik, 2016 – Afghanistan
- Zaitunia inderensis Ponomarev, 2005 – Kazakhstan
- Zaitunia kunti Zonstein & Marusik, 2016 – Cyprus, Turkey
- Zaitunia logunovi Zonstein & Marusik, 2016 – Kazakhstan, Kyrgyzstan
- Zaitunia maracandica (Charitonov, 1946) – Uzbekistan, Kazakhstan
- Zaitunia martynovae (Andreeva & Tyschchenko, 1969) – Tajikistan
- Zaitunia medica Brignoli, 1982 – Iran
- Zaitunia minoica Zonstein & Marusik, 2016 – Greece (Crete)
- Zaitunia minuta Zonstein & Marusik, 2016 – Uzbekistan
- Zaitunia persica Brignoli, 1982 – Iran
- Zaitunia psammodroma Zonstein & Marusik, 2016 – Turkmenistan
- Zaitunia rufa (Caporiacco, 1934) – Pakistan, India
- Zaitunia schmitzi (Kulczyński, 1911) (type) – Egypt, Israel
- Zaitunia spinimana Zonstein & Marusik, 2016 – Kazakhstan, Turkmenistan
- Zaitunia vahabzadehi Zamani & Marusik, 2016 – Iran
- Zaitunia wunderlichi Zonstein & Marusik, 2016 – Kyrgyzstan
- Zaitunia zagrosica Zamani & Marusik, 2018 – Iran
- Zaitunia zonsteini Fomichev & Marusik, 2013 – Kazakhstan
