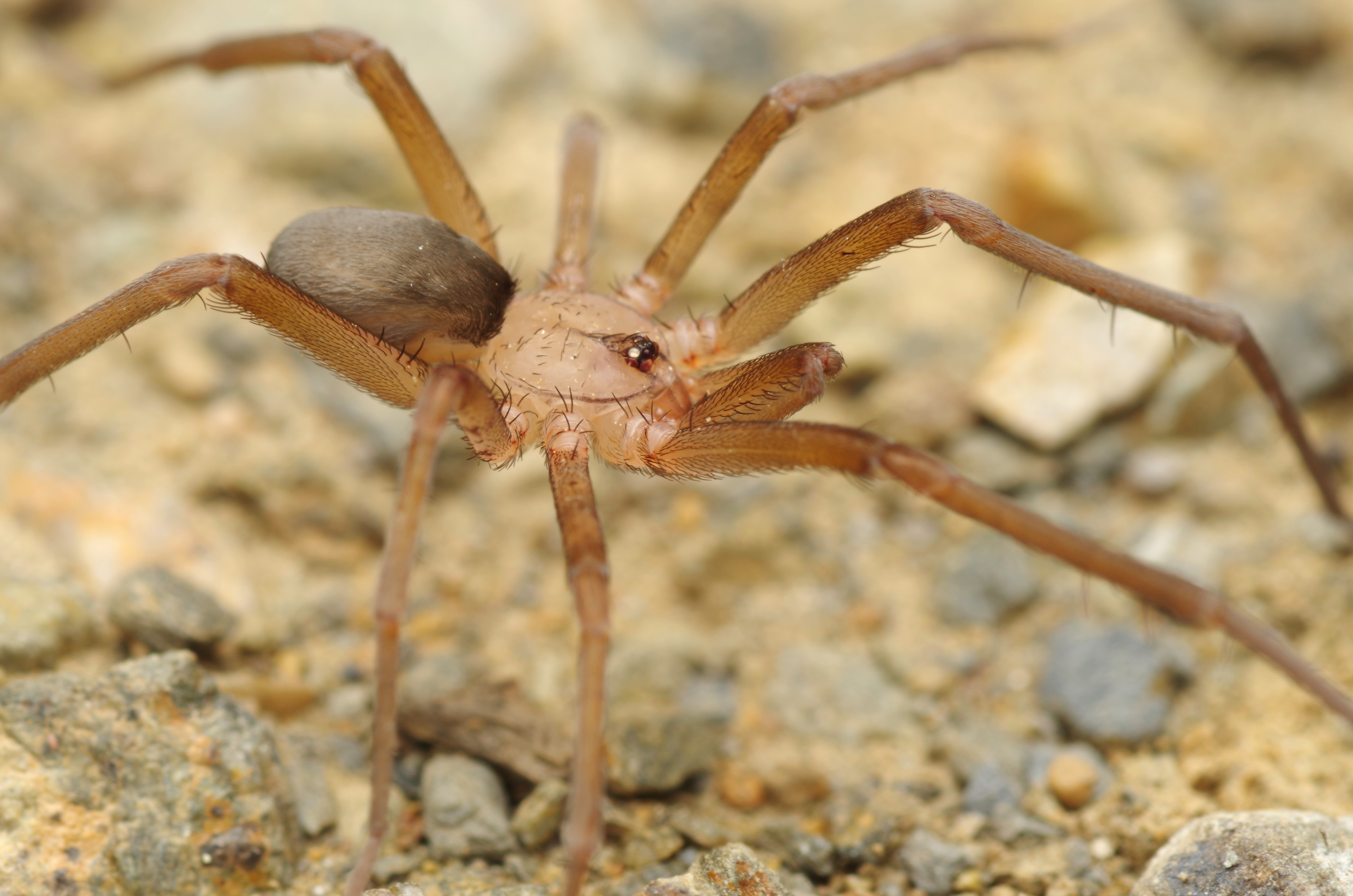
- Male

Scientific classification
- Kingdom: Animalia
- Phylum: Arthropoda
- Subphylum: Chelicerata
- Class: Arachnida
- Order: Araneae
- Infraorder: Araneomorphae
- Family: Filistatidae
- Genus: Filistata
- Species: F. insidiatrix

Binomial name
- Filistata insidiatrix (Forskål, 1775)

Synonyms
- Aranea insidiatrix Forsskål, 1775; Filistata testacea Latreille, 1810; Filistata bicolor Latreille, 1817; Teratodes attalicus C. L. Koch, 1838; Oecobius nigripalpis Dufour, 1863

= Filistata insidiatrix =

Species of spider

Filistata insidiatrix is a species of spiders that occurs in the Mediterranean through to Turkmenistan and on the Cape Verde Islands.

It is the biggest filistatid species, with females up to 14mm (males up to 7mm). These slender brown spiders have long pedipalps. Of the eight eyes, two appear white and are easily discerned. It is found on old walls and under rocks, where it builds a tube-like web that opens like a funnel.
