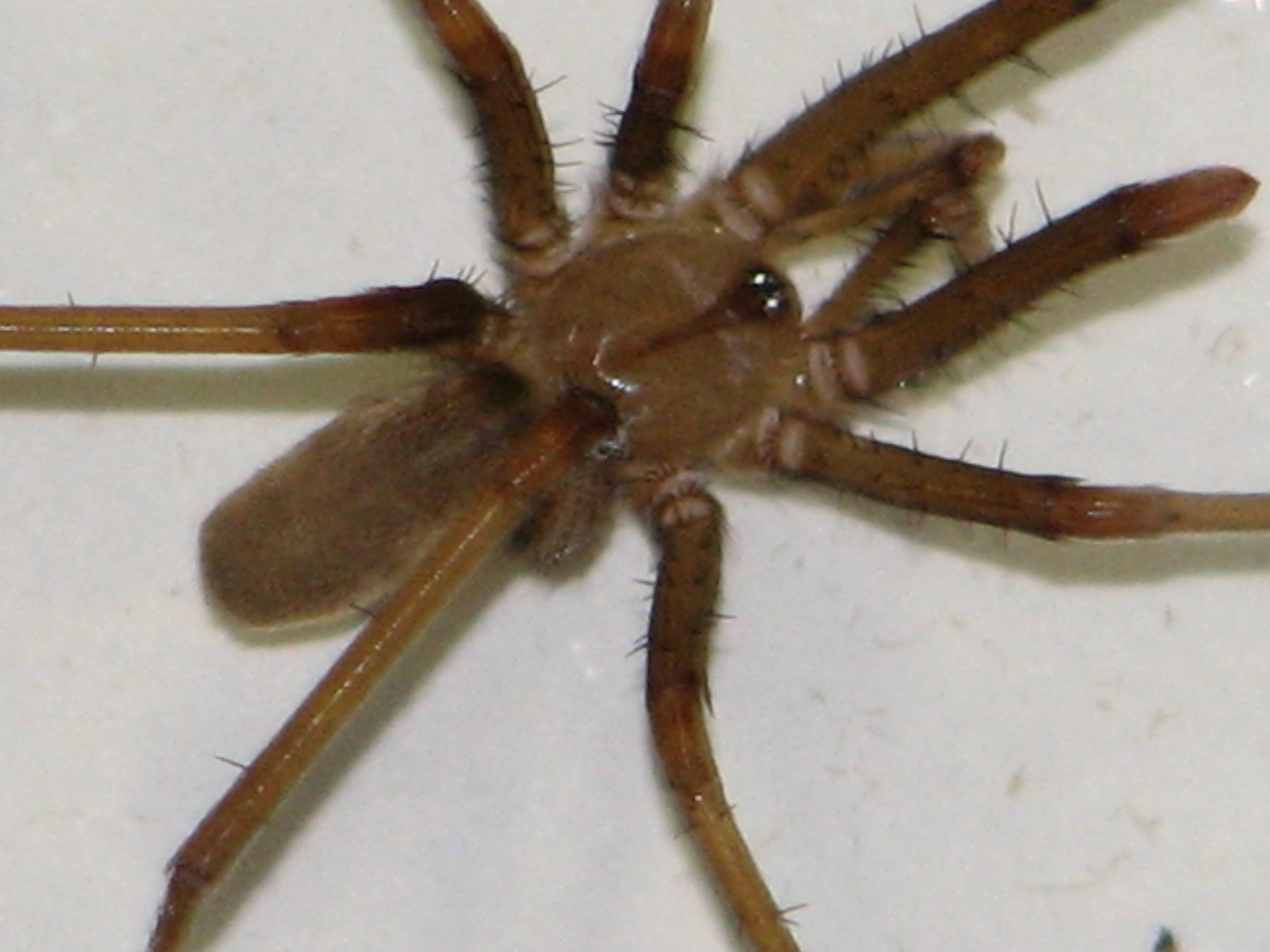
- Kukulcania hibernalis (Male)
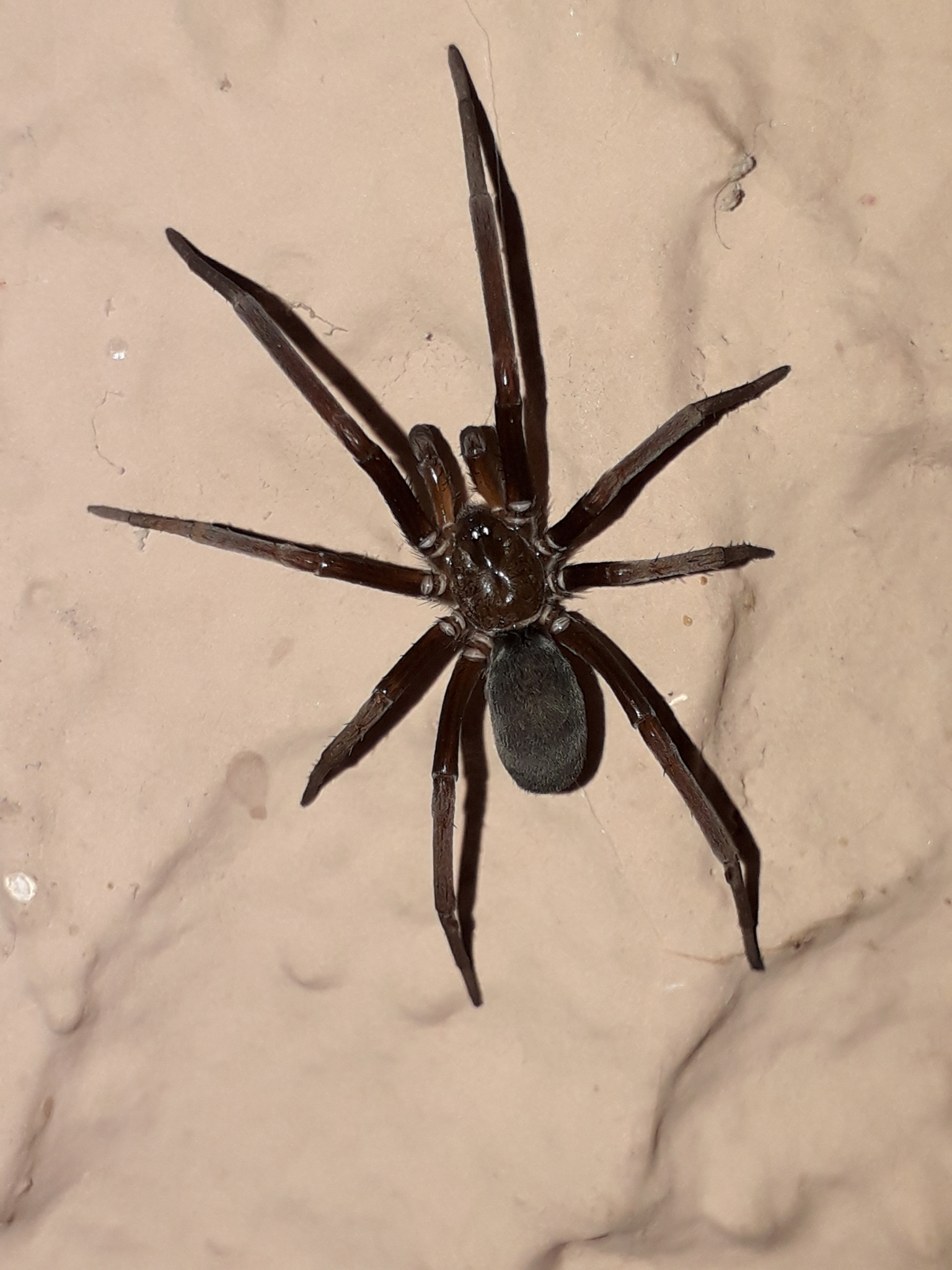
- Kukulcania hibernalis (Female)

Scientific classification
- Kingdom: Animalia
- Phylum: Arthropoda
- Subphylum: Chelicerata
- Class: Arachnida
- Order: Araneae
- Infraorder: Araneomorphae
- Family: Filistatidae
- Genus: Kukulcania
- Species: K. hibernalis

Binomial name
- Kukulcania hibernalis (Hentz, 1842)

Synonyms
- Filistata hibernalis Filistata capitata Teratodes depressus Filistata cubaecola Filistata distincta Filistata depressa Mygale muritelaria Filistata tractans Filistata capito

= Southern house spider =

Species of spider

The southern house spider is a species of large spider in the family Filistatidae. Currently given the scientific name Kukulcania hibernalis, it was formerly known as Filistata hibernalis. Found in the Americas, it exhibits strong sexual dimorphism. It lives in the southern states of the USA, throughout Central America and some of the Caribbean, to southern Brazil, Uruguay and Argentina. The males may be mistaken for brown recluse because the two have similar coloration and body structure. However, compared to the brown recluse, male southern house spiders are often larger in size, lack the distinctive violin shape on their cephalothorax, and have unusually long slender pedipalps. The females are dark brown or black and more compact. Both genders may grow to be roughly 2 inches (5.1 cm) across (legs extended), with the males typically having longer legs, and the females often having larger, bulbous bodies. The abdomen of the southern house spider is covered with fine velvety light gray hair.

Female southern house spiders are rarely seen, as they build radial webs around crevices, for which reason their family (Filistatidae) is called crevice weavers. Females rarely move except to capture prey caught in their webs. Males, on the other hand, typically wander in search of insects and females to mate with, having no particular territory.

The southern house spider is a cribellate spider. That is, its spinnerets do not produce adhesive webbing. Instead, to capture prey, the spider uses its legs to comb webbing across its cribellum, a spiked plate near the spinnerets. This combing action frays and tangles the strands, producing a fine, velcro-like netting that ensnares insect legs.

Male southern house spiders sometimes appear aggressive, but they do not bite unless trapped, and their mouthparts are too small to easily penetrate human skin. They do, however, have an unnerving tendency to crawl across anything in their path regardless of whether it is alive. This is not aggression; these spiders are simply almost blind and cannot see larger animals. These spiders instinctively play dead if they feel threatened (a tactic which is effective against their common predators).

Southern house spiders are capable of crawling through crevices as narrow as 1/4 in (0.66 cm) due to their elongated bodies and compact legs.

== Reproduction ==
The southern house spider mating ritual is a lengthy (over an hour) and elaborate process with long lapses during which neither the male nor the female moves considerably. When the wandering male encounters a female's web, there may be an initial confrontation where each scares the other. Upon recovering, the male then constructs a large web around the female's crevice. When this web is complete, the male pulls on its strands continuously to draw the female out of her hole, which may take several minutes. Following her emergence, each spider will tap at the other in an effort to grasp themselves by the forelegs, with the male remaining suspended in his web.

Females of Kukulcania hibernalis produce clutches containing approximately 129 eggs. Each egg measures about 1.37 mm in diameter and weighs around 1.42 mg. The average female body mass is about 347.0 mg.
