= Wandella =

Scientific classification
- Domain: Eukaryota
- Kingdom: Animalia
- Phylum: Arthropoda
- Subphylum: Chelicerata
- Class: Arachnida
- Order: Araneae
- Infraorder: Araneomorphae
- Family: Filistatidae
- Genus: Wandella; Gray, 1994

Type species
- W. barbarella Gray, 1994

Species
- 14, see text

Genus of spiders

Wandella is a genus of Australian crevice weavers that was first described by Michael R. Gray in 1994.

== Species ==
As of March 2022 it contains 14 species:

- Wandella alinjarra Gray, 1994 – Australia (Northern Territory)
- Wandella australiensis (L. Koch, 1873) – Australia (Queensland)
- Wandella barbarella Gray, 1994 (type) – Australia (Western Australia)
- Wandella centralis Gray, 1994 – Australia (Western Australia, Northern Territory, South Australia)
- Wandella diamentina Gray, 1994 – Australia (Queensland, South Australia)
- Wandella grayi Magalhaes, 2016 – Australia (Queensland)
- Wandella infernalis Magalhaes, 2016 – Australia (Western Australia)
- Wandella loloata (Magalhaes, Berry, Koh & Gray, 2022) – Papua New Guinea
- Wandella murrayensis Gray, 1994 – Australia (South Australia, New South Wales, Victoria, Western Australia)
- Wandella orana Gray, 1994 – Australia (New South Wales, Queensland)
- Wandella pallida Gray, 1994 – Australia (Western Australia)
- Wandella parnabyi Gray, 1994 – Australia (Western Australia, Northern Territory)
- Wandella stuartensis Gray, 1994 – Australia (Western Australia, South Australia, New South Wales, Queensland)
- Wandella waldockae Gray, 1994 – Australia (Western Australia)
