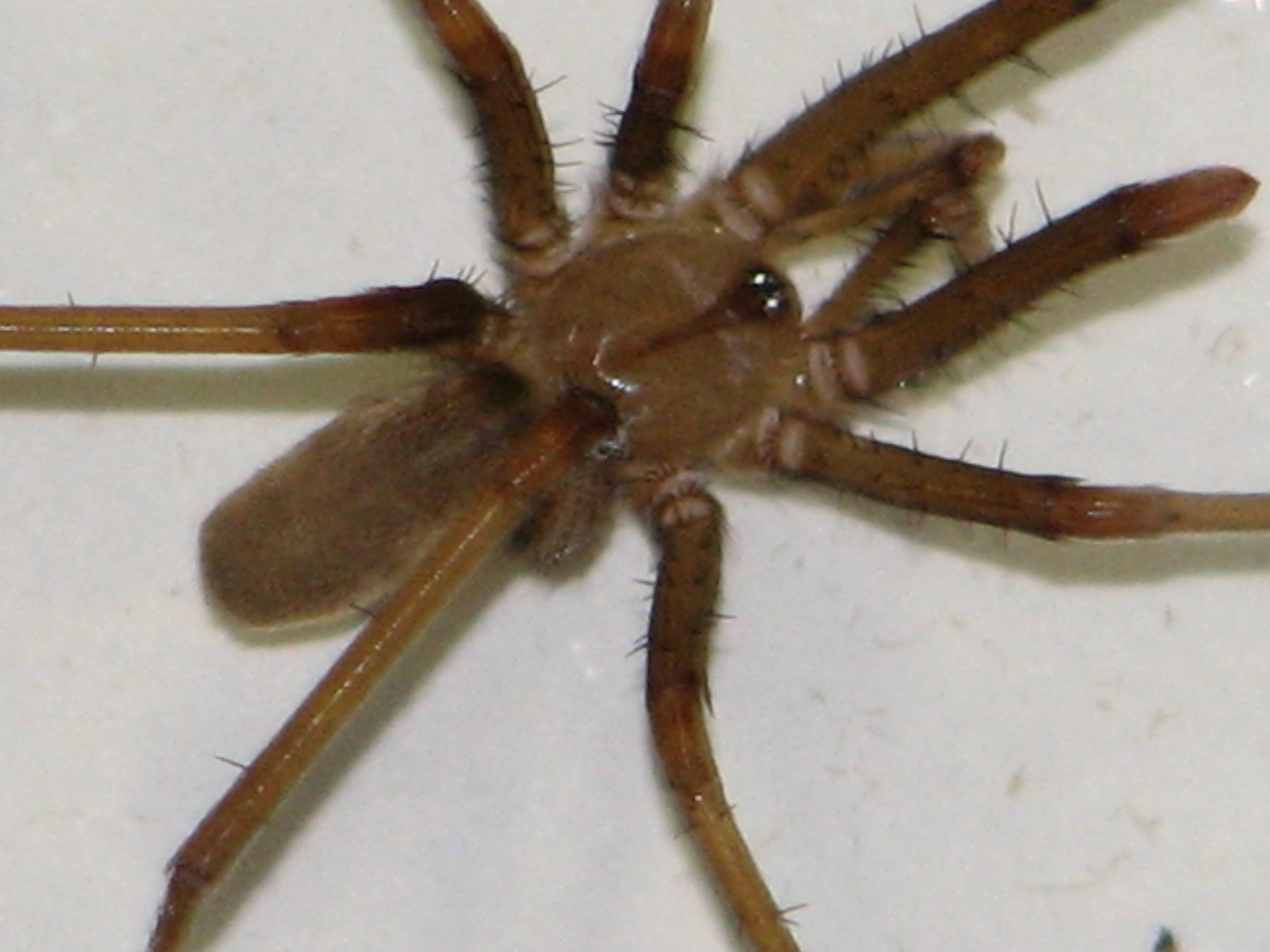
- Southern house spider (Kukulcania hibernalis)

Scientific classification
- Domain: Eukaryota
- Kingdom: Animalia
- Phylum: Arthropoda
- Subphylum: Chelicerata
- Class: Arachnida
- Order: Araneae
- Infraorder: Araneomorphae
- Family: Filistatidae
- Genus: Kukulcania; Lehtinen, 1967

Type species
- Kukulcania hibernalis (Hentz, 1842)

Species
- 15, see text

= Kukulcania =

Genus of spiders

Kukulcania is a genus of crevice weavers that was first described by Pekka T. Lehtinen in 1967. It is named after Kukulkan, a Mesoamerican serpent deity.

== Species ==
As of May 2019 it contains fifteen species found in the Americas, including the United States, Peru, and Chile:

- Kukulcania arizonica (Chamberlin & Ivie, 1935) – USA, Mexico
- Kukulcania bajacali Magalhaes & Ramírez, 2019 – Mexico
- Kukulcania benita Magalhaes & Ramírez, 2019 – Mexico (San Benito Is., Baja California)
- Kukulcania brignolii (Alayón, 1981) – Mexico
- Kukulcania chingona Magalhaes & Ramírez, 2019 – Mexico
- Kukulcania cochimi Magalhaes & Ramírez, 2019 – Mexico
- Kukulcania geophila (Chamberlin & Ivie, 1935) – USA, Mexico
- Kukulcania gertschi Magalhaes & Ramírez, 2019 – Mexico
- Kukulcania hibernalis (Hentz, 1842) (type) – USA, Mexico, Central America, Caribbean, South America
- Kukulcania hurca (Chamberlin & Ivie, 1942) – USA, Mexico
- Kukulcania mexicana Magalhaes & Ramírez, 2019 – Mexico
- Kukulcania santosi Magalhaes & Ramírez, 2019 – Mexico, El Salvador, Nicaragua, Costa Rica. Probably introduced in Peru, Chile
- Kukulcania tequila Magalhaes & Ramírez, 2019 – Mexico
- Kukulcania tractans (O. Pickard-Cambridge, 1896) – Mexico
- Kukulcania utahana (Chamberlin & Ivie, 1935) – USA, Mexico
