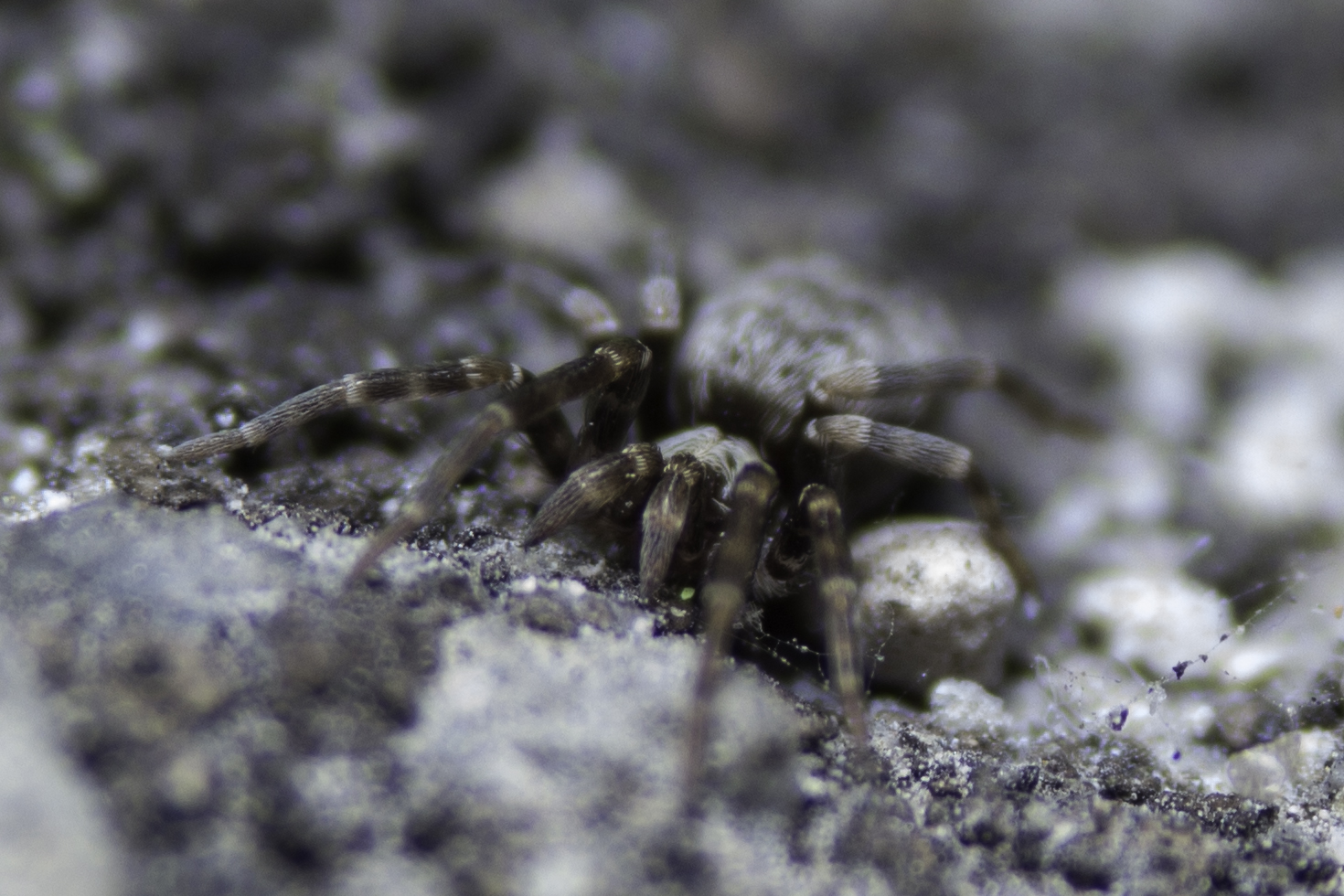
- Unknown species of Filistatinella

Scientific classification
- Kingdom: Animalia
- Phylum: Arthropoda
- Subphylum: Chelicerata
- Class: Arachnida
- Order: Araneae
- Infraorder: Araneomorphae
- Family: Filistatidae
- Genus: Filistatinella; Gertsch & Ivie, 1936

Type species
- F. crassipalpis (Gertsch, 1935)

Species
- 10, see text

= Filistatinella =

Genus of spiders

Filistatinella is a genus of North American crevice weavers that was first described by Willis J. Gertsch & Wilton Ivie in 1936. They are 1.5 to 3.5 millimetres (0.059 to 0.138 in) long, and have a dark brown abdomen, longer than wide, with a few gray scales.

== Species ==
As of May 2019 it contains ten species:

- Filistatinella chilindrina Magalhaes & Ramírez, 2017 – Mexico
- Filistatinella crassipalpis (Gertsch, 1935) (type) – Southern Texas
- Filistatinella domestica Desales-Lara, 2012 – Mexico
- Filistatinella hermosa Magalhaes & Ramírez, 2017 – USA
- Filistatinella howdyall Magalhaes & Ramírez, 2017 – USA
- Filistatinella kahloae Magalhaes & Ramírez, 2017 – Mexico
- Filistatinella palaciosi Jiménez & Palacios-Cardiel, 2012 – Mexico
- Filistatinella pistrix Magalhaes & Ramírez, 2017 – USA
- Filistatinella spatulata Magalhaes & Ramírez, 2017 – USA, Mexico
- Filistatinella tohono Magalhaes & Ramírez, 2017 – USA
