= Tricalamus =

Scientific classification
- Domain: Eukaryota
- Kingdom: Animalia
- Phylum: Arthropoda
- Subphylum: Chelicerata
- Class: Arachnida
- Order: Araneae
- Infraorder: Araneomorphae
- Family: Filistatidae
- Genus: Tricalamus; Wang, 1987

Type species
- T. tetragonius Wang, 1987

Species
- 16, see text

Genus of spiders

Tricalamus is a genus of crevice weavers that was first described by J. F. Wang in 1987.

== Species ==
As of March 2022 it contains 16 species:

- Tricalamus albidulus Wang, 1987 – China
- Tricalamus biyun Zhang, Chen & Zhu, 2009 – China
- Tricalamus gansuensis Wang & Wang, 1992 – China
- Tricalamus jiangxiensis Li, 1994 – China
- Tricalamus lindbergi (Roewer, 1962) – Afghanistan
- Tricalamus linzhiensis Hu, 2001 – China
- Tricalamus longimaculatus Wang, 1987 – China
- Tricalamus longiventris (Yaginuma, 1967) – Japan
- Tricalamus menglaensis Wang, 1987 – China
- Tricalamus meniscatus Wang, 1987 – China
- Tricalamus papilionaceus Wang, 1987 – China
- Tricalamus papillatus Wang, 1987 – China
- Tricalamus tarimuensis (Hu & Wu, 1989) – China
- Tricalamus tetragonius Wang, 1987 (type) – China
- Tricalamus xianensis Wang & Wang, 1992 – China
- Tricalamus xizanensis (Hu, Hu & Li, 1987) – China
