= Pholcoides =

Scientific classification
- Domain: Eukaryota
- Kingdom: Animalia
- Phylum: Arthropoda
- Subphylum: Chelicerata
- Class: Arachnida
- Order: Araneae
- Infraorder: Araneomorphae
- Family: Filistatidae
- Genus: Pholcoides; Roewer, 1960

Type species
- P. afghana Roewer, 1960

Species
- P. afghana Roewer, 1960 – Afghanistan; P. monticola (Spassky, 1941) – Tajikistan; P. seclusa (O. Pickard-Cambridge, 1885) – India

Genus of spiders

Pholcoides is a genus of Asian crevice weavers that was first described by Carl Friedrich Roewer in 1960. As of May 2019, it contains only three species: P. afghana, P. monticola, and P. seclusa.
