= Antilloides =

Antilloides Temporal range: Neogene–present

Scientific classification
- Kingdom: Animalia
- Phylum: Arthropoda
- Subphylum: Chelicerata
- Class: Arachnida
- Order: Araneae
- Infraorder: Araneomorphae
- Family: Filistatidae
- Genus: Antilloides; Alayón

Type species
- Antilloides abeli

Species
- Antilloides abeli Brescovit, Sánchez-Ruiz & Alayón, 2016; Antilloides cubitas Brescovit, Sánchez-Ruiz & Alayón, 2016; Antilloides haitises Brescovit, Sánchez-Ruiz & Alayón, 2016; Antilloides mesoliticus Brescovit, Sánchez-Ruiz & Alayón, 2016; Antilloides zozo Brescovit, Sánchez-Ruiz & Alayón, 2016

Genus of spiders

Antilloides is a genus of spiders in the family Filistatidae. It was first described in 2016 by Brescovit, Sánchez-Ruiz & Alayón. As of 2017, it contains 5 species, all from the Caribbean.
