= Lihuelistata =

Scientific classification
- Kingdom: Animalia
- Phylum: Arthropoda
- Subphylum: Chelicerata
- Class: Arachnida
- Order: Araneae
- Infraorder: Araneomorphae
- Family: Filistatidae
- Genus: Lihuelistata; Ramírez & Grismado, 1997
- Species: L. metamerica

Binomial name
- Lihuelistata metamerica (Mello-Leitão, 1940)

Genus of spiders

Lihuelistata is a monotypic genus of South American crevice weavers containing the single species, Lihuelistata metamerica. It was first described by M. J. Ramírez & C. J. Grismado in 1997, and has only been found in Argentina.
