= Afrofilistata =

Scientific classification
- Kingdom: Animalia
- Phylum: Arthropoda
- Subphylum: Chelicerata
- Class: Arachnida
- Order: Araneae
- Infraorder: Araneomorphae
- Family: Filistatidae
- Genus: Afrofilistata; Benoit, 1968
- Species: A. fradei

Binomial name
- Afrofilistata fradei (Berland & Millot, 1940)

Genus of spiders

Afrofilistata is a monotypic genus of African crevice weavers containing the single species, Afrofilistata fradei. It was first described by Pierre L.G. Benoit in 1968, and has been found in west and central Africa and in Sudan.
