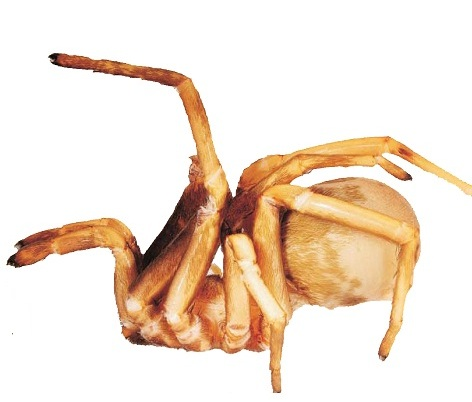

Scientific classification
- Kingdom: Animalia
- Phylum: Arthropoda
- Subphylum: Chelicerata
- Class: Arachnida
- Order: Araneae
- Infraorder: Araneomorphae
- Family: Filistatidae
- Genus: Sahastata
- Species: S. sinuspersica

Binomial name
- Sahastata sinuspersica Marusik, Zamani & Mirshamsi, 2014

= Sahastata sinuspersica =

Species of spider

Sahastata sinuspersica is a species of the araneomorph spider family Filistatidae (crevice weavers).

== Distribution ==
This species is endemic to Hormozgan Province, Iran.

== Description ==
The female holotype measured 12.0 mm and a male was measured 4.85 mm.

== Etymology ==
This species was named after the Persian Gulf.
