= Yardiella =

Scientific classification
- Domain: Eukaryota
- Kingdom: Animalia
- Phylum: Arthropoda
- Subphylum: Chelicerata
- Class: Arachnida
- Order: Araneae
- Infraorder: Araneomorphae
- Family: Filistatidae
- Genus: Yardiella; Gray, 1994
- Species: Y. humphreysi

Binomial name
- Yardiella humphreysi Gray, 1994

Genus of spiders

Yardiella is a monotypic genus of Australian crevice weavers containing the single species, Yardiella humphreysi. It was first described by Michael R. Gray in 1994, and has only been found in Australia.
