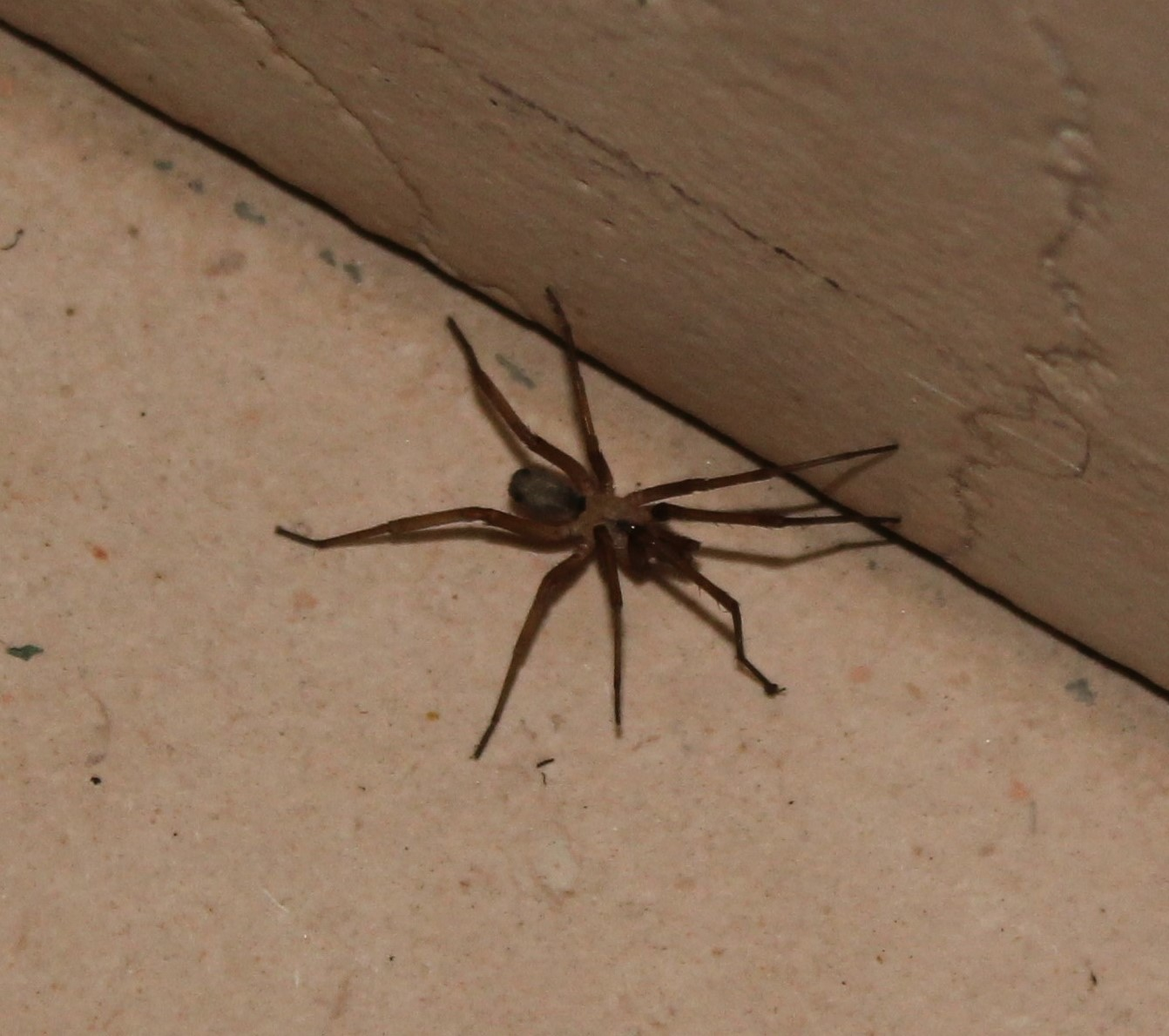
- Filistata insidiatrix

Scientific classification
- Kingdom: Animalia
- Phylum: Arthropoda
- Subphylum: Chelicerata
- Class: Arachnida
- Order: Araneae
- Infraorder: Araneomorphae
- Family: Filistatidae
- Genus: Filistata; Latreille, 1810

Type species
- F. insidiatrix (Forsskål, 1775)

Species
- 14, see text

= Filistata =

Genus of spiders

Filistata is a genus of crevice weavers that was first described by Pierre André Latreille in 1810.

== Species ==
As of September 2022 it contains 14 species that occur mainly from Eurasia and the Canary Islands, with one species found in Cape Verde:

- Filistata albens Zonstein & Marusik, 2019 – Israel
- Filistata balouchi Zamani & Marusik, 2020 – Iran
- Filistata betarif (Magalhaes, Aharon, Ganem & Gavish-Regev, 2022) – Israel
- Filistata canariensis Schmidt, 1976 – Canary Is.
- Filistata gomerensis Wunderlich, 1992 – Canary Is.
- Filistata hasselti Simon, 1906 – Indonesia (Java?)
- Filistata insidiatrix (Forsskål, 1775) (type) – Cape Verde Is., Mediterranean to Turkmenistan
- Filistata lehtineni Marusik & Zonstein, 2014 – Azerbaijan, Iran
- Filistata lubinae Zonstein & Marusik, 2019 – Israel
- Filistata maguirei Marusik & Zamani, 2015 – Iran
- Filistata pseudogomerensis Wunderlich, 1992 – Canary Is.
- Filistata pygmaea Zonstein, Marusik & Grabolle, 2018 – Portugal
- Filistata teideensis Wunderlich, 1992 – Canary Is.
- Filistata wunderlichi Zonstein & Marusik, 2019 – Spain
