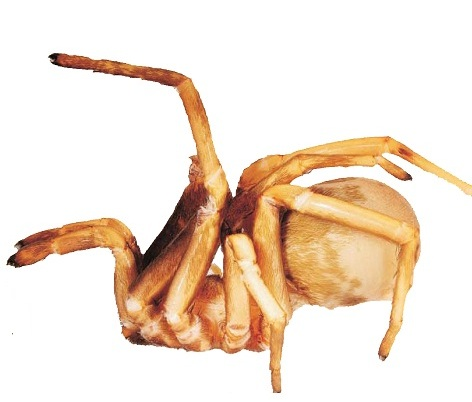
- Sahastata sinuspersica

Scientific classification
- Kingdom: Animalia
- Phylum: Arthropoda
- Subphylum: Chelicerata
- Class: Arachnida
- Order: Araneae
- Infraorder: Araneomorphae
- Family: Filistatidae
- Genus: Sahastata; Benoit, 1968

Type species
- S. nigra (Simon, 1897)

Species
- 10, see text

= Sahastata =

Genus of spiders

Sahastata is a genus of crevice weavers that was first described by Pierre L.G. Benoit in 1968.

== Species ==
As of September 2022 it contains 10 species:

- Sahastata amethystina Marusik & Zamani, 2016 – Iran
- Sahastata aravaensis (Ganem, Magalhaes, Zonstein & Gavish-Regev, 2022) – Israel, Jordan
- Sahastata ashapuriae Patel, 1978 – India
- Sahastata bosmansi Zonstein & Marusik, 2019 – Algeria
- Sahastata infuscata (Kulczyński, 1901) – Eritrea
- Sahastata nigra (Simon, 1897) (type) – Mediterranean to India
- Sahastata sabaea Brignoli, 1982 – Yemen
- Sahastata sinuspersica Marusik, Zamani & Mirshamsi, 2014 – Iran
- Sahastata wesolowskae Magalhaes, Stockmann, Marusik & Zonstein, 2020 – Oman
- Sahastata wunderlichi Magalhaes, Stockmann, Marusik & Zonstein, 2020 – Morocco
