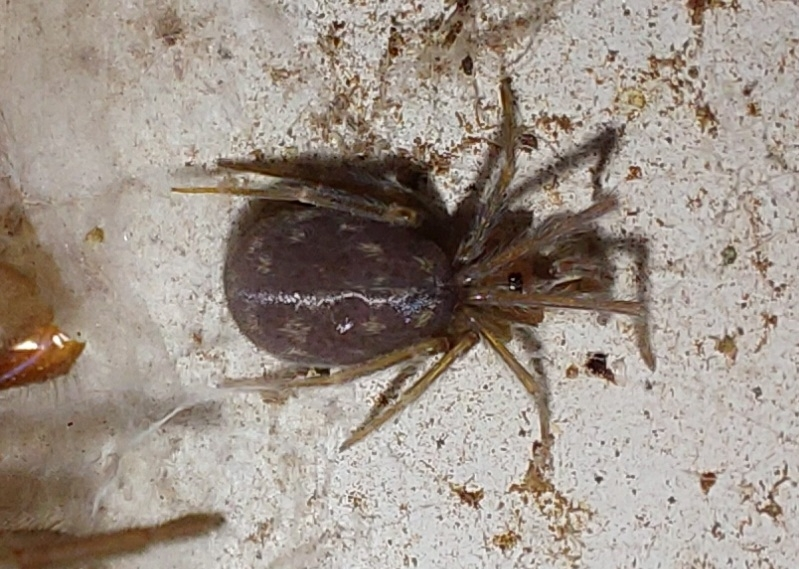
- A. ansieae
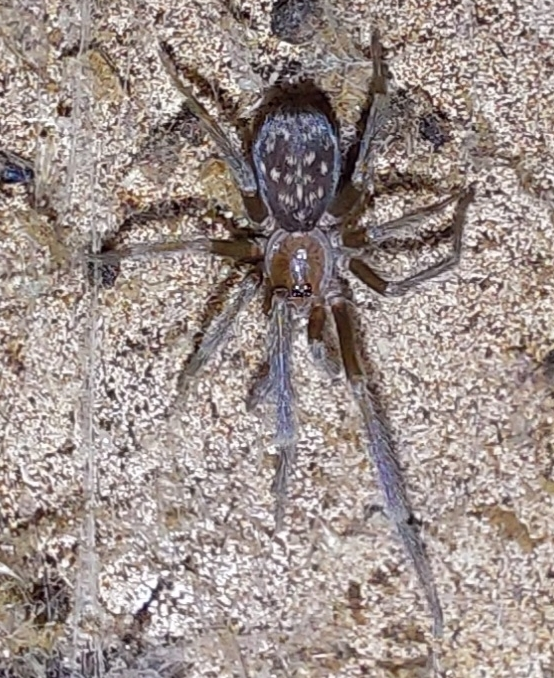
- A. ansieae

Scientific classification
- Kingdom: Animalia
- Phylum: Arthropoda
- Subphylum: Chelicerata
- Class: Arachnida
- Order: Araneae
- Infraorder: Araneomorphae
- Family: Filistatidae
- Genus: Andoharano; Lehtinen, 1967

Type species
- A. decaryi (Fage, 1945)

Species
- 12, see text

= Andoharano =

Genus of spiders

Andoharano is a genus of African crevice weavers that was first described by Pekka T. Lehtinen in 1967.

== Distribution ==
All but one of the dozen species are endemic to Madagascar. A. ansieae, described in 2015, is found is mainland southern Africa.

== Description ==
Body size ranges from 3-5mm with coloration varying from pale yellow to light brown or dark. The carapace has a cephalic region that is distinctly narrowed anteriorly with no fovea present and is usually densely covered with fine setae. The sternum is short, oval or subcircular, and deeply indented to accommodate the coxae and is fused to the labium. The chelicerae are dorsally free but ventrally connected by a thin membrane with short fangs and a cheliceral furrow containing a lamina. The labium is as wide as long and fused to the sternum with strongly converging endites.

Eight eyes are arranged in a compact group situated on a small tubercle. The abdomen is oval with spinnerets set slightly forward. The median spinnerets are two-segmented with a large basal spigot. The cribellum is divided and subtriangular to narrowly transverse.

Legs are fairly long, especially in males, with numerous spines and paired setae ventrally on the tibiae and metatarsi. The tarsi bear three dentate claws with a calamistrum present on metatarsus IV. The pedipalp has all segments covered with long setae, with setae on the patella, tibia and cymbium longer than corresponding segments on legs. The femur is longer than the patella and tibia combined, with long sub-erected ventral setae and decumbent dorsal setae.

== Species ==
As of September 2025, this genus includes twelve species, all but one endemic to Madagascar:

- Andoharano ansieae Zonstein & Marusik, 2015 – Namibia, Botswana, South Africa
- Andoharano decaryi (Fage, 1945) – Madagascar (type species)
- Andoharano grandidieri (Simon, 1901) – Madagascar
- Andoharano griswoldi Magalhaes & Grismado, 2019 – Madagascar
- Andoharano lehtineni Magalhaes & Grismado, 2019 – Madagascar
- Andoharano milloti Legendre, 1972 – Madagascar
- Andoharano monodi Legendre, 1972 – Madagascar
- Andoharano ramirezi Magalhaes & Grismado, 2019 – Madagascar
- Andoharano rollardae Magalhaes & Grismado, 2019 – Madagascar
- Andoharano simoni Magalhaes & Grismado, 2019 – Madagascar
- Andoharano woodae Magalhaes & Grismado, 2019 – Madagascar
- Andoharano zonsteini Magalhaes & Grismado, 2019 – Madagascar
