= Microfilistata =

Scientific classification
- Domain: Eukaryota
- Kingdom: Animalia
- Phylum: Arthropoda
- Subphylum: Chelicerata
- Class: Arachnida
- Order: Araneae
- Infraorder: Araneomorphae
- Family: Filistatidae
- Genus: Microfilistata; Zonstein, 1990

Type species
- M. tyshchenkoi Zonstein, 1990

Species
- M. magalhaesi Zamani & Marusik, 2018 – Iran; M. ovchinnikovi Zonstein, 2009 – Turkmenistan; M. tyshchenkoi Zonstein, 1990 – Tajikistan

Genus of spiders

Microfilistata is a genus of Asian crevice weavers that was first described by S. L. Zonstein in 1990. As of May 2019 it contains only three species: M. magalhaesi, M. ovchinnikovi, and M. tyshchenkoi.
