= Nicholas Marcellus Hentz =

French American educator and entomologist (1797-1856)

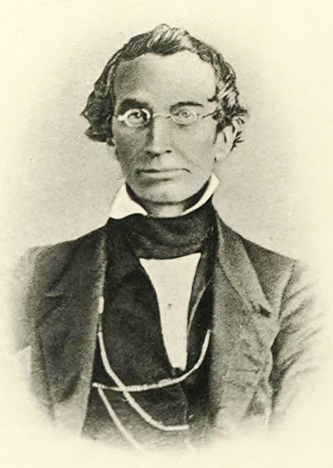
- Born: 25 June 1797; Versailles, French First Republic
- Died: 4 November 1856 (aged 59); Marianna, Florida, US
- Occupations: Painter, Educator, and Arachnologist
- Known for: America's first arachnologist
- Notable work: The Spiders of the United States
- Spouse: Caroline Lee Whiting (married 30 September 1824)
- Children: 5

Nicholas Marcellus Hentz (July 25, 1797 – November 4, 1856) was a French American educator and arachnologist.

== Biography ==
Hentz was born in Versailles, France. He was the youngest child of Charles Nicholas Arnould Hentz and Marie-Anne Therese Daubree Hentz. He studied medicine and learned the art of miniature painting in Paris. His father was an active Republican and participant in the French Revolution. Upon the restoration of the Bourbons in 1815, his father was banished from France. So, in 1816, Nicholas Marcellus Hentz emigrated with his family to the United States, where they settled in Wilkes-Barre, Pennsylvania. He taught French and miniature painting in Boston, Philadelphia, and other places. He became a member of the Academy of Natural Sciences of Philadelphia (ANSP) in 1819. His illustrations were published in their journal.

Among these illustrations are three well known watercolors, two of which are of freshwater fish from Alabama (painted in 1847) and one is a miniature of Hentz's father-in-law, John Whiting (painted 1824–1850). In 1820, Hentz enrolled as a medical student at Harvard but soon after abandoned his studies to teach. In 1824/5 he was associated with George Bancroft in the Round Hill School at Northampton, Massachusetts. From 1826 to 1830, he was professor of modern languages and belles lettres in the University of North Carolina. In 1827, he became the "chair of modern languages" at the university. In 1830, Hentz conducted a female academy for two years. Following, he conducted various schools in Cincinnati, Ohio, 1832–1834; Florence, Alabama, 1834–1843; Tuscaloosa, Alabama, 1843–1845; Tuskegee, Alabama, 1845–1848; and Columbia, Alabama, 1848–1849. After 1851, Hentz and his wife lived with his son in Marianna, Florida, where he eventually died from an illness in 1856.

== Family ==
He married Caroline Lee Whiting on 30 September 1824; they moved to Covington, Kentucky in 1831. Caroline was an author with numerous published works in periodicals and newspapers. It is rumored that although not a revolutionary, her female characters exhibited strong qualities for assertiveness and independence possibly as consequence of an oppressive relationship with her husband. Her last novel, "Ernest Linwood" (1858), was based on an incident in which Hentz became jealous of Caroline's admirers and resulted in the end of their residence in Cincinnati.

Hentz and his wife had five children: Marcellus Fabius (1825–1827), Charles Arnould Hentz (1827–1894), Julia Louisa (1829–1877), Thaddeus William Harris (1830–1878), and Caroline Therese (1833–1904). Julia was born at Chapel Hill, North Carolina. She was educated by both of her parents and married in 1846 to Dr. John Washington Keyes in Tuskegee. Julia wrote several short poems but most of her works were never published. Her most well known work was a prize poem called "A Dream of Locust Dell". The youngest daughter, Caroline Therese, was born in Cincinnati, Ohio and also educated by her parents and married the Baptist pastor, Rev. James O. Branch. She went on to publish tales and sketches published in magazines. Charles Arnould became a physician (Allopath).

== Religious concerns ==
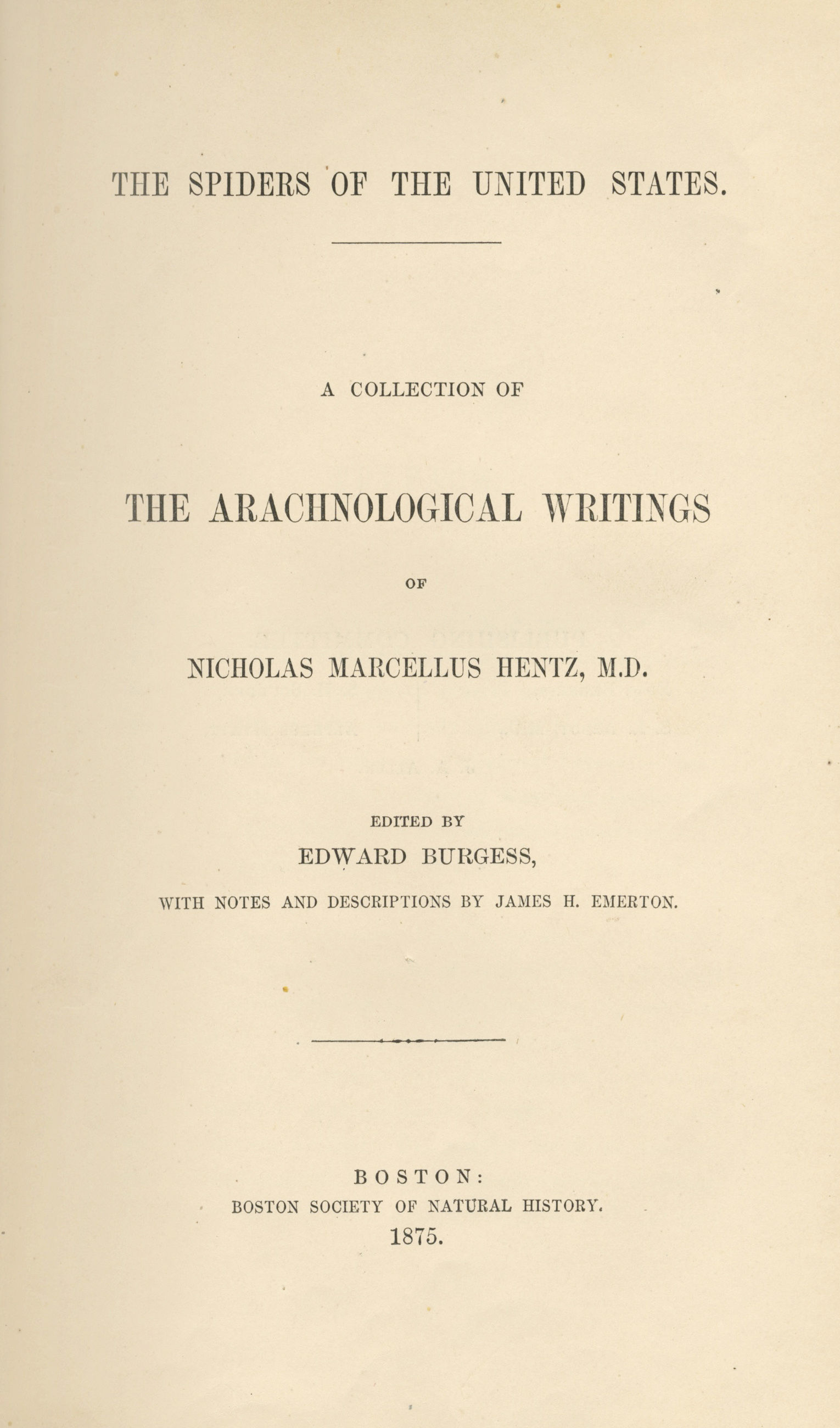
Title page of The Spiders of the United States: A Collection of the Arachnological Writings of Nicholas Marcellus Hentz, M.D. (1875)

As the most accomplished entomologist in the United States, Hentz was offered an honorary M.A. degree by the University of North Carolina in 1829. Yet, there were mixed feelings in the community about the renowned scholar. The community at the university was largely Presbyterian and did not approve of Hentz's Roman Catholic background, and was predisposed to "ejaculatory prayer". Hentz also had a severe nervous disorder.

Many of his students thought the study of French went against their religious principles. Consequently, Hentz was suspected of French revolutionary liberalism. Hentz resigned from the university in 1833 after finding new academic regulations too restrictive. After Hentz left the university, French was completely dropped from the curriculum.

== Arachnids ==
Hentz became a pioneering zoologist in the field of arachnology. In France, he had developed a long lasting friendship with Thomas Say (1787–1834). Originally, he and Say were going to collaborate and illustrate a collection called "American Entomology". In the United States, Hentz took to collecting insects. He sold his collection to the Boston Society of Natural History in the 1840s. Hentz is best known for describing 141 spider species and these descriptions were published in the society's journal between 1842 and 1850. He was one of the first to collect and document North American spiders. As is custom in binomial naming, each species was noted with his name and the year Hentz classified them. A few spiders from his collection are the Yellow sac spider, the Southern house spider, a common tarantula, and a genus of jumping spider.

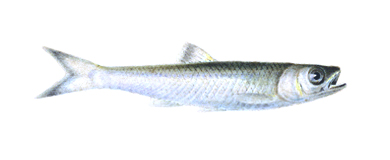
Water color of a Fresh water fish by Hentz

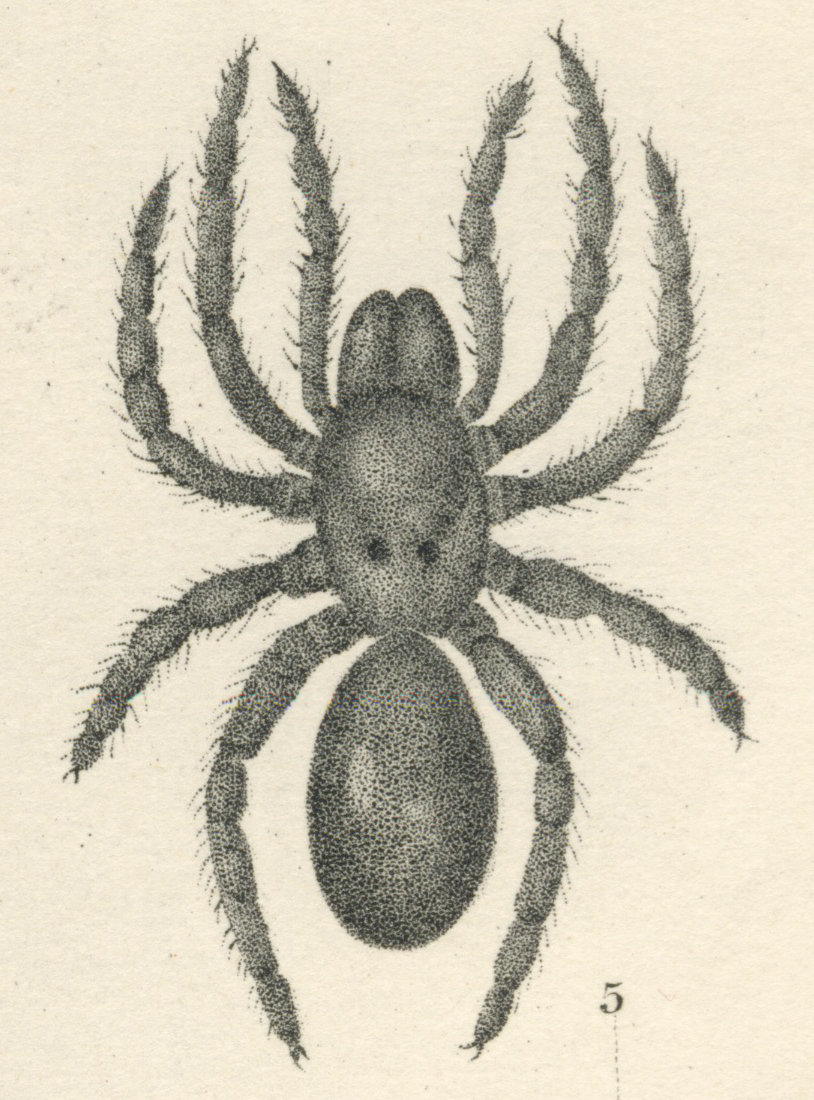
Exemplar of spider drawings

Hentz made his first publication on alligators in 1820 which was followed by French textbooks issued between 1822 and 1839. In 1825, he published a novel about the Indian massacre of 1778. This novel is called "Tadeuskund, the Last King of the Lenape, an Historical Tale". Finally, his major collection in arachnology was republished in 1875. This collection is entitled "The Spiders of the United States: A Collection of the Arachnological Writings of Nicholas Marcellus Hentz, M.D."

== Sources ==
- Wilson, J. G.; Fiske, J., eds. (1892). "Hentz, Nicholas Marcellus" . Appletons' Cyclopædia of American Biography. New York: D. Appleton.
- "Tadeuskund, the Last King of the Lenape". www.asp.org. Retrieved 2015-12-08.
- "Hentz, Nicholas Marcellus". ncpedia.org. Retrieved 2012-12-08.
