= Pikelinia =

Scientific classification
- Kingdom: Animalia
- Phylum: Arthropoda
- Subphylum: Chelicerata
- Class: Arachnida
- Order: Araneae
- Infraorder: Araneomorphae
- Family: Filistatidae
- Genus: Pikelinia; Mello-Leitão, 1946

Type species
- P. tambilloi (Mello-Leitão, 1941)

Species
- 21, see text

Synonyms
- Malalistata Mello-Leitão, 1946

Genus of spiders

Pikelinia is a genus of South American crevice weavers that was first described by Cândido Firmino de Mello-Leitão in 1946.

== Species ==
it contains 21 species:

- Pikelinia aikewara (Brescovit, Magalhaes & Cizauskas, 2016) – Brazil
- Pikelinia arenicola (Lise, Ferreira & Silva, 2010) – Brazil
- Pikelinia brevipes (Keyserling, 1883) – Peru
- Pikelinia carajas (Brescovit, Magalhaes & Cizauskas, 2016) – Brazil
- Pikelinia colloncura Ramírez & Grismado, 1997 – Argentina
- Pikelinia fasciata (Banks, 1902) – Ecuador (Galapagos Is.)
- Pikelinia floydmuraria (Villarreal et al., 2026) – Colombia (Tolima)
- Pikelinia jaminawa (Grismado & Ramírez, 2000) – Peru, Bolivia, Brazil
- Pikelinia kiliani Müller, 1987 – Colombia
- Pikelinia kolla Ramírez & Grismado, 1997 – Argentina
- Pikelinia mahuell Ramírez & Grismado, 1997 – Argentina
- Pikelinia mendensis (Mello-Leitão, 1920) – Brazil, Paraguay, Argentina
- Pikelinia milloti (Zapfe, 1961) – Chile
- Pikelinia pallida (Brescovit, Magalhaes & Cizauskas, 2016) – Brazil
- Pikelinia patagonica (Mello-Leitão, 1938) – Argentina
- Pikelinia puna Ramírez & Grismado, 1997 – Argentina
- Pikelinia roigi Ramírez & Grismado, 1997 – Argentina
- Pikelinia tambilloi (Mello-Leitão, 1941) (type) – Argentina
- Pikelinia ticucho Ramírez & Grismado, 1997 – Argentina
- Pikelinia uspallata Grismado, 2003 – Argentina
- Pikelinia schiapelliae (Ivan L. F. Magalhaes et al., 2024) - Argentina
