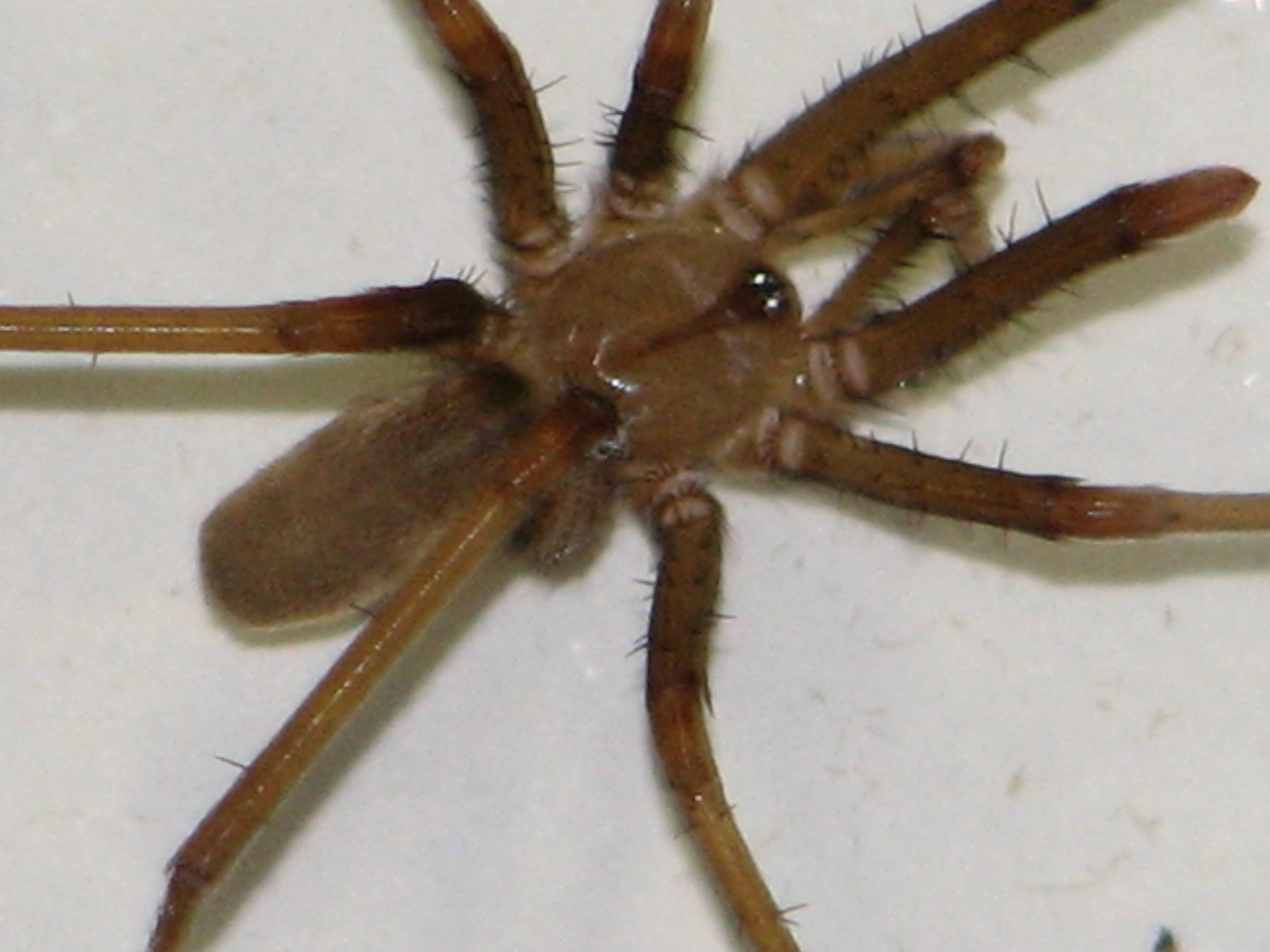
- male Kukulcania hibernalis
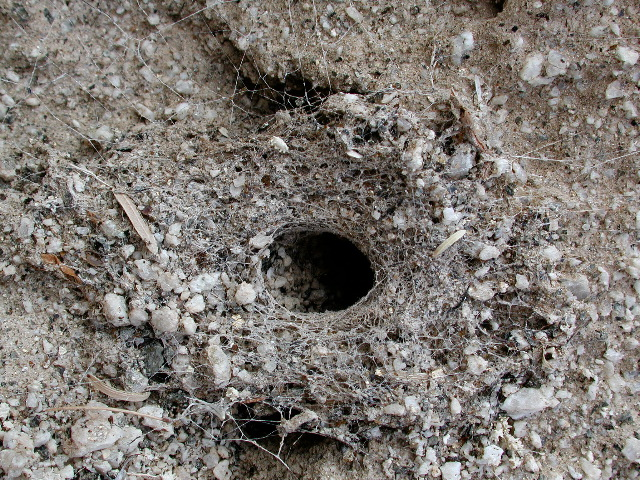
- Filistatid web

Scientific classification
- Kingdom: Animalia
- Phylum: Arthropoda
- Subphylum: Chelicerata
- Class: Arachnida
- Order: Araneae
- Infraorder: Araneomorphae
- Family: Filistatidae; Ausserer, 1867

Diversity
- 18 genera, 192 species
- blue: reported countries (WSC) green: observation hotspots (iNaturalist)

= Crevice weaver =

Crevice weavers Temporal range: Neogene–present

Family of spiders

Crevice weaver spiders (Filistatidae) are cribellate spiders with features that have been regarded as "primitive" for araneomorph spiders. They are weavers of funnel or tube webs. The family contains 18 genera and more than 120 described species worldwide.

== Southern house spider ==
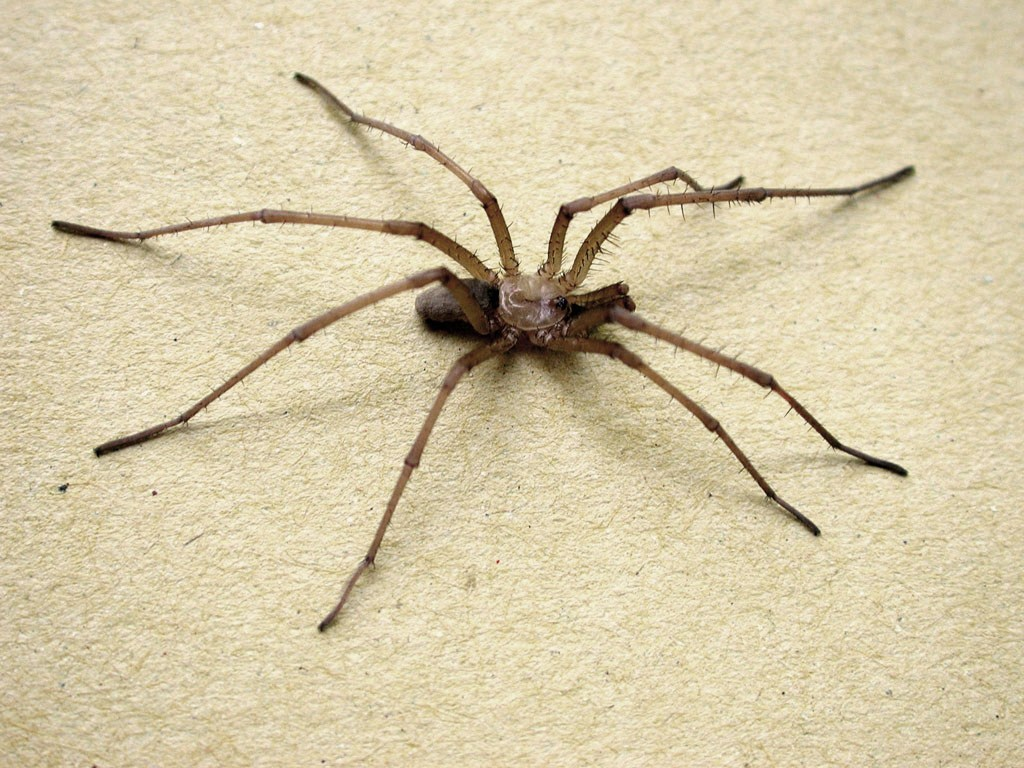
male Kukulcania hibernalis

One of the most abundant members of this family in the Americas is the southern house spider (Kukulcania hibernalis). Named after the fierce Meso-American god Kukulkan, the females are large (up to nearly 20 mm) dark-colored spiders and males are light brown, smaller (about 10 mm), but more long-legged and with palps that are held together in front of their carapaces like the horn of a unicorn.

The males also have a darker streak on the center of the dorsal carapace that causes them to be often mistaken for brown recluse spiders. The tiny members of the genus Filistatinella are like miniature versions of Kukulcania. The nominate genus Filistata is Afro-Eurasian in distribution. In many older books the species from the Americas now placed in the genus Kukulcania are placed in Filistata.

== Description ==
A striking visual characteristic of the family, beside dimorphism, is the unusual upward bend encountered near the femur of the first pair of legs. While resembling hydraulic muscle mechanisms akin to arthropods, this modification actually allows the spider to retain the prey directly from the crevice it occupies. Also, if the larger prey ever tries to pull it from the crevice, the spider can use these legs to "grab" to the side walls and hence make it difficult. Many Kukulcania species also use them to dig holes in the soft ground at a 25- to 30-degree angle.

== Taxonomy ==
The family Filistatidae was created in 1867 by Anton Ausserer. It was based on the species he called Filistata bicolor (now Filistata insidiatrix), a Mediterranean species also found in southern Austria.

=== Phylogeny ===
On the basis of the features of the male and female genitalia, the family was placed in the Haplogynae, usually as the sister taxon of the remaining members of the group. However, unlike the other haplogynes, Filistatidae are cribellate and do not show a decrease in the number of segments of the anterior lateral spinnerets. They have other features which have been regarded as "primitive": an M-shaped intestine, only leg IV moving while combing silk, and posterior book lung leaves being present in early juveniles. A 2013 study based on molecular evidence placed the family as sister to a clade consisting of Hypochilidae and the remaining haplogynes. The precise phylogenetic position of the family was described in 2014 as "one of the most enigmatic problems in spider phylogeny".

A 2015 study, based on genomic data, places Filistatidae with Hypochilidae in a clade outside most of the families previously placed in Haplogynae:

- Araneomorphae
  - - - Hypochilidae
      - Filistatidae
    - most other "traditional" haplogynes
  - - Leptonetidae
    - Entelegynae

This placement suggests that features that were thought to be "primitive" to araneomorph spiders as a whole (such as an M-shaped midgut) could actually be novel derived features (synapomorphies) of the Hypochilidae-Filistatidae clade.

=== Genera ===
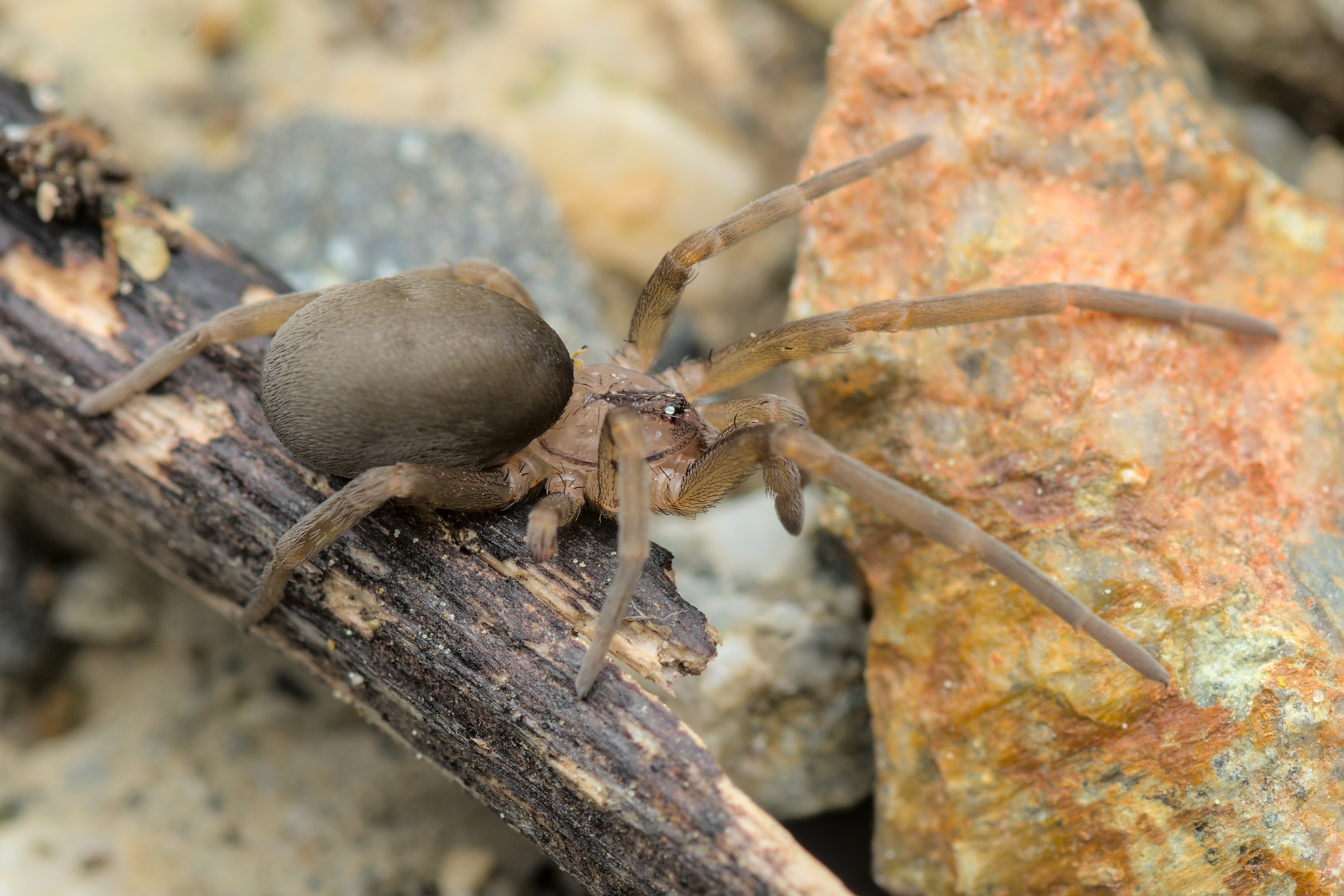
Filistata insidiatrix

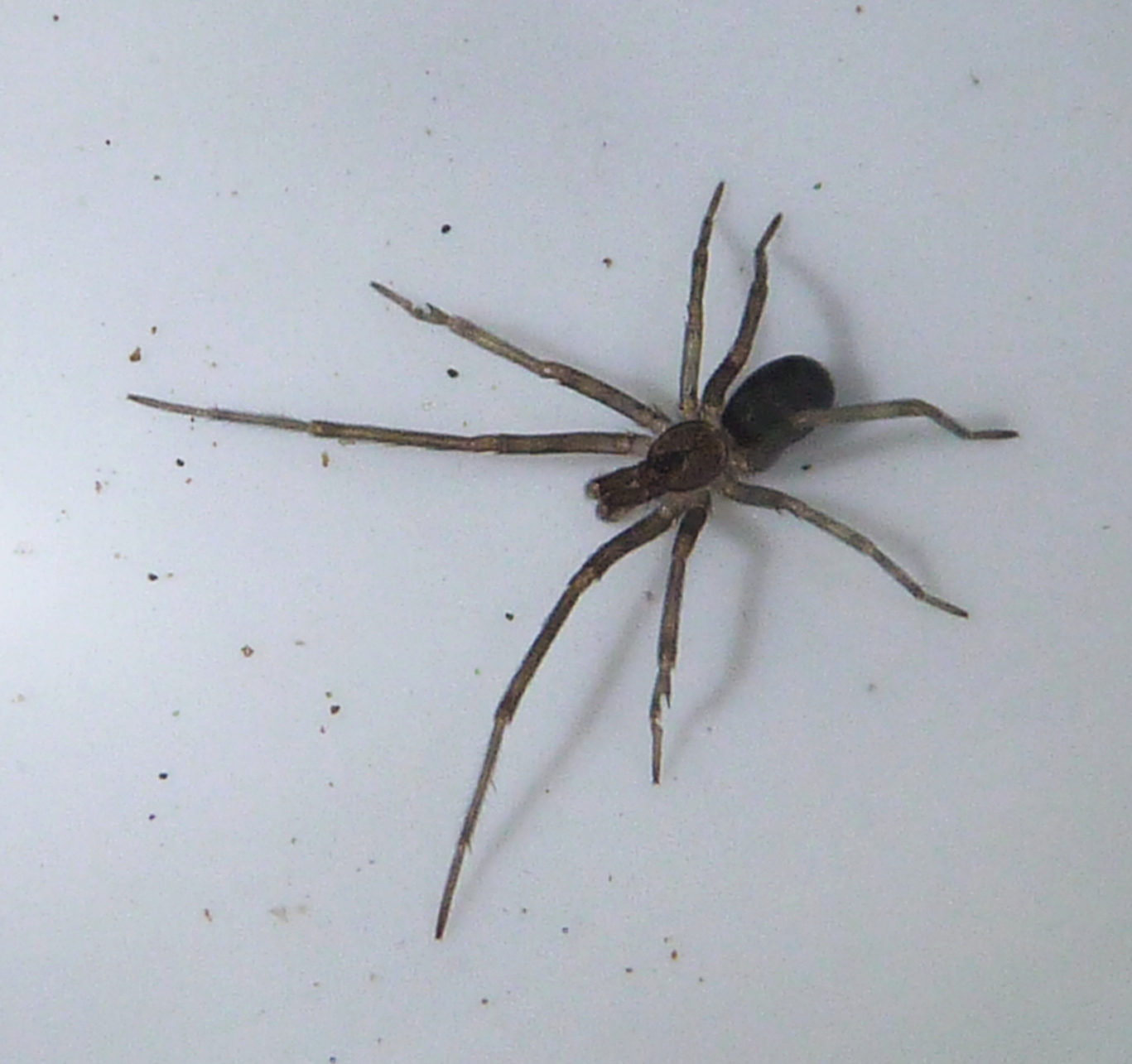
male Pikelinia mahuell

As of September 2025, this family includes eighteen genera and 192 species:

- Afrofilistata Benoit, 1968 – West, Central Africa, Sudan
- Andoharano Lehtinen, 1967 – Botswana, Madagascar, Namibia, South Africa
- Antilloides Brescovit, Sánchez-Ruiz & Alayón, 2016 – Cuba, Dominican Rep. Mexico, Puerto Rico, Virgin Islands
- Filistata Latreille, 1810 – Australia, Asia, Europe. Introduced to Azores, Venezuela, Yemen (Socotra)
- Filistatinella Gertsch & Ivie, 1936 – Mexico, United States
- Filistatoides F. O. Pickard-Cambridge, 1899 – Cuba, Mexico, Guatemala
- Kukulcania Lehtinen, 1967 – North, Central, South America
- Labahitha Zonstein, Marusik & Magalhaes, 2017 – Asia, Oceania. Introduced to Mexico.
- Lihuelistata Ramírez & Grismado, 1997 – Argentina
- Microfilistata Zonstein, 1990 – Iran, Tajikistan, Turkmenistan
- Pholcoides Roewer, 1960 – India, Tajikistan, Afghanistan, China, Pakistan
- Pikelinia Mello-Leitão, 1946 – South America
- Pritha Lehtinen, 1967 – Eurasia
- Sahastata Benoit, 1968 – Algeria to India, Kenya
- Tricalamus Wang, 1987 – Afghanistan, China, Japan
- Wandella Gray, 1994 – Australia
- Yardiella Gray, 1994 – Australia (Western Australia)
- Zaitunia Lehtinen, 1967 – Greece to India, Egypt
