= List of authors of names published under the ICZN =

This is a list of notable zoologists who have published names of new taxa under the International Code of Zoological Nomenclature.

== A ==
- Abe – Tokiharu Abe (1911–1996)
- Abeille de Perrin, Ab. – Elzéar Abeille de Perrin (1843–1910)
- Able – Kenneth W. Able (born 1945)
- Abbott, C.C. Abbott – Charles Conrad Abbott (1843–1919) general zoology
- C. Abbott – Charles Abbot (1761–1817) entomology
- J. Abbott – John Abbot (1751–1841) entomology, ornithology
- W. Abbott, Abbott – William Louis Abbott (1860–1936) mainly ornithology
- Acerbi – Giuseppe Acerbi (1773–1846)
- Acero – Arturo Acero Pizarro (born 1954)
- Adams, Ad. – Charles Baker Adams (1814–1853) malacology
- A. Adams – Arthur Adams (1820–1878) mostly marine animals
- A.L. Adams – Andrew Leith Adams (1827–1882) vertebrate paleontology
- D.B. Adams – Daniel B. Adams (fl. 1979) paleontology
- E. Adams – Edward Adams (1824–1856)
- H. Adams – Henry Adams (1813–1877) malacology
- Agassiz, Ag., L. Ag., Agass. – Louis Agassiz (1807–1873) ichthyology, paleontology
- A. Agassiz, A. Ag. – Alexander Emanuel Agassiz (1835–1910) mostly marine animals
- Agenjo – Ramon Agenjo Cecilia (1908–1984)
- Aguilera – Orangel Antonio Aguilera
- D.R. de Aguilera – Dione Rodrigues de Aguilera
- Ahl, E. Ahl – Ernst Ahl (1898–1943) herpetology, ichthyology
- J.N. Ahl, Ahl – Jonas Niclas Ahl
- Ahlquist – Jon Edward Ahlquist (fl. late 20th century)
- Ahlstrom – Elbert Halvor Ahlstrom (1910–1979)
- Ahnelt – Harald Ahnelt
- Aizawa – Masahiro Aizawa
- Akama – Alberto Akama
- Akihito – Emperor Akihito of Japan (born 1933)
- Albert – James S. Albert
- Albertis – Luigi Maria d'Albertis (1841–1901)
- Alcock – Alfred William Alcock (1859–1933)
- Aldrovandi, Aldr. – Ulisse Aldrovandi (1522–1605)
- Alexander, B. Alexander – Boyd Alexander (1873–1910) ornithology
- A. Alexander – Annie Montague Alexander (1867–1950) paleontology
- C. Alexander, Alexander – Charles Paul Alexander (1889–1981) entomology
- H. Alexander – Horace Alexander (1889–1989) ornithology
- W. Alexander – Wilfred Backhouse Alexander (1885–1965) entomology, ornithology
- Alencar – José Eduardo de Alencar Moreira (born 1953)
- Alfaro – Anastasio Alfaro (1865–1951)
- Alifanov – Vladimir R. Alifanov
- Allain – Ronan Allain (born 1974)
- Allen – Edgar Johnson Allen (1866–1942) marine biology
- Allen, J.A. Allen – Joel Asaph Allen (1838–1921) ornithology, American mammals
- A. Allen – Arthur Augustus Allen (1885–1964) ornithology
- G.M. Allen – Glover Morrill Allen (1879–1942) mainly mammals
- G.R. Allen – Gerald R. Allen (born 1942) Ichthyology
- H. Allen – Harrison Allen (1841–1897) Chiroptera
- J.A. Allen – John A. Allen malacology
- Allioni – Carlo Allioni (1728–1804)
- Allman, Allm. – George James Allman (1812–1898)
- Almeida-Toledo – Lurdes Foresti de Almeida Toledo
- Alströmer – Clas Alströmer (1736–1794), a pupil of Linnaeus
- Amadon – Dean Amadon (1912–2003)
- Ambrosio – Alfredo Ambrosio
- Ameghino – Florentino Ameghino (1854–1911)
- Amyot – Charles Jean-Baptiste Amyot (1799–1866)
- Ancey – César Marie Félix Ancey (1860–1906)
- K. Andersen – Knud Andersen (born 1867, disappeared 1918)
- Anderson, J. Anderson – John Anderson (1833–1900) Asian mammals and reptiles
- R. Anderson – Rudolph Martin Anderson (1876–1961) mammals
- S. Anderson – Steven Clement Anderson (born 1936) herpetology
- W. Anderson – William Anderson (1750–1778) general zoology
- André – Jacques Ernest Edmond André (1844–1891)
- Andriyashev, Andriashev, Andrijaschew – Anatoly Petrovich Andriyashev (1910–2009)
- Angas – George French Angas (1822–1886)
- Annandale – Nelson Annandale (1876–1924)
- Anthony – Harold Elmer Anthony (1890–1970)
- Antunes – Miguel Telles Antunes (born 1937)
- Apesteguía – Sebastián Apesteguía
- Appellöf – Adolf Appellöf (1857–1921)
- Archbold – Richard Archbold (1907–1976)
- Archer – William Archer (1830?–1897) microorganisms
- M. Archer – Michael Archer (born 1945) mammals, paleontology
- Arcucci – Andrea B. Arcucci
- Arrow – Gilbert John Arrow (1873–1948)
- Artedi, Arctaedius, Art. – Peter Artedi (1705–1735)
- Asano – Nagao Asano
- Ascanius fl.1772
- Ashmead – William Harris Ashmead (1855–1908)
- Asso – Ignacio Jordán Claudio de Asso y del Rio (1742–1814)
- Atkinson – William Stephen Atkinson (1820–1876)
- Aubé, Aub. – Charles Aubé (1802–1869)
- Audebert, Audeb. – Jean-Baptiste Audebert (1759–1800)
- Audubon, Audub. – John James Audubon (1785–1851)
- Aurivillius, P. Aurivillius, Auriv. – Per Olof Christopher Aurivillius (1853–1928) entomology
- C. Aurivillius – Carl Wilhelm Samuel Aurivillius (1854–1899)
- S. Aurivillius – Sven Magnus Aurivillius (1892–1928) marine zoology
- Ausserer, Auss. – Anton Ausserer (1907–1976)
- Ayling – Tony Ayling (born 1947)
- Ayres, W.O. Ayres – William Orville Ayres (1805–1887) ichthyology
- J.M. Ayres – José Márcio Ayres (1954–2003) primates
- Azara, Az. – Félix de Azara (1746–1821)
- Azmi – Azmi Ambak ichthyology
- Azuma – Yoichi Azuma

== B ==
- Bachman – John Bachman (1790–1874)
- Bailey – Steven Bailey zoology
- R.G. Bailey – Roland G. Bailey
- R.M. Bailey – Reeve Maclaren Bailey (1911–2011)
- Baillon – Louis Antoine François Baillon (1778–1851)
- Baird – Spencer Fullerton Baird (1823–1887)
- Baker – Edward Charles Stuart Baker (1864–1944)
- Bakker – Robert T. Bakker (born 1945)
- Balanov – Andrei A. Balanov
- C.C. Baldwin – Carole C. Baldwin
- W.J. Baldwin – Wayne J. Baldwin
- Z.H. Baldwin – Zachary Hayward Baldwin
- Balinsky – Boris Balinsky (1905–1997) entomology
- Ball – Valentine Ball (1843–1895)
- Balon – Eugene K. Balon (1930–2013)
- Balouet – Jean-Christophe Balouet (1956–2021) ornithology, paleontology
- Balss – Heinrich Balss (1886–1957)
- Balushkin – Arkadii Vladimirovich Balushkin
- Bandyopadhyay – Saswati Bandyopadhyay
- Bangs – Outram Bangs (1863–1932) vertebrates (mainly birds and mammals)
- Banjkovski – V. B. Banjkovski (1889–1912) ornithology
- Banks – Nathan Banks (1868–1953) entomology
- R. Banks – Richard C. Banks (born 1931)
- Bannerman – David Armitage Bannerman (1886–1979) ornithology
- Bannikov – Alexandre Fedorovich Bannikov
- Bansok – Ros Bansok
- Barbour – Thomas Barbour (1884–1946)
- F.K. Barker – Frederick Keith Barker ornithology
- M.J. Barker – Michael J. Barker
- Barnard fl. 1923
- Barnes & McDunnough – James Halliday McDunnough (1877–1962)
- Barrett – Paul M. Barrett
- Barrows – Walter Bradford Barrows (1855–1923)
- Barsbold – Rinchen Barsbold (born 1935) paleontology (mainly theropod dinosaurs)
- Bartenef – Aleksandr Nikolaevich Bartenev (1882–1946)
- Bartlett – Edward Bartlett (1836–1908) ornithology
- A.D. Bartlett – Abraham Dee Bartlett (1812–1897) general zoology (mainly vertebrates)
- Barton – Benjamin Smith Barton (1766–1815)
- Baskin – Jonathan N. Baskin
- Batchelder – Charles Foster Batchelder (1856–1954)
- Bate – Charles Spence Bate (1819–1889)
- Bates – George Latimer Bates (1863–1940)
- Bateson – William Bateson (1861–1926)
- Bean – Tarleton Hoffman Bean (1846–1916)
- Beatty– Joseph Beatty
- Beavan – Reginald C. Beavan (1841–1870)
- Bechstein – Johann Matthäus Bechstein (1757–1822)
- Beddome – Richard Henry Beddome (1830–1911)
- Bedriaga – Jacques von Bedriaga (1854–1906)
- Behr – Hans Hermann Behr (1818–1904)
- Bell – Thomas Bell (1792–1880)
- Bemmel – Adriaan Cornelis Valentin van Bemmel
- Bendire – Charles Emil Bendire (1863–1940)
- Benitez – Hesiquio Benitez-Diaz
- Bennett – Edward Turner Bennett (1797–1836) general zoology
- F. Bennett – Frederick Debell Bennett (1836–1897)
- Benson – Constantine Walter Benson (1909–1982) ornithology
- R. Benson – Robert Bernard Benson (1904–1967)
- Benson – William Henry Benson (1803–1870) malacology
- Bent – Arthur Cleveland Bent (1866–1954)
- Benton – Michael J. Benton (born 1939)
- Beresford – Pamela Beresford
- Berg – Lev Berg (1876–1950)
- Berkenhout – John Berkenhout (1726–1791)
- Berla – Herbert Franzioni Berla (1912–1985)
- Berland – Lucien Berland (1888–1962)
- Berlepsch – Hans von Berlepsch (1850–1915)
- Berlioz – Jacques Berlioz (1891–1975)
- Berry – Samuel Stillman Berry (1887–1984)
- Bertelsen – Erik Bertelsen
- Berthold – Arnold Adolph Berthold (1803–1861)
- Bertkau – Philipp Bertkau (1849–1894)
- Bezzi – Mario Bezzi (1868–1927) entomology
- Bianco – Pier Giorgio Bianco
- Bibron – Gabriel Bibron (1806–1848)
- Bigot – Jacques Marie François Bigot (1818–1893)
- Bilek – Alois Bilek (1909–1974)
- Billberg – Gustaf Johan Billberg (1772–1844)
- Billings – Elkanah Billings (1820–1876) paleontology
- Bingham – Charles Thomas Bingham (1848–1908)
- Biswas – Biswamoy Biswas (1923–1994)
- Blache – Jacques Blache (1922–1994)
- Black – Davidson Black (1884–1934)
- Blackburn – Thomas Blackburn (1844–1912) entomology
- Blackwall – John Blackwall (1790–1881)
- Blainville – Henri Marie Ducrotay de Blainville (1777–1850)
- Blanchard – Charles Émile Blanchard (1819–1900)
- Blanford – William Thomas Blanford (1832–1905)
- Blasius – Johann Heinrich Blasius (1809–1870) general zoology (mainly vertebrates)
- W. Blasius – August Wilhelm Heinrich Blasius (1845–1912) ornithology
- Blatchley – Willis Blatchley (1859–1940)
- Bleeker – Pieter Bleeker (1819–1878)
- Bloch – Marcus Elieser Bloch (1723–1799)
- Bloch fl. 1923
- Blumenbach – Johann Friedrich Blumenbach (1752–1840)
- Blüthgen – August Victor Paul Blüthgen (1880–1967)
- Blyth – Edward Blyth (1810–1873)
- Bocage – José Vicente Barbosa du Bocage (1823–1907)
- Bocourt – Marie Firmin Bocourt (1819–1904)
- Boddaert – Pieter Boddaert (1730–1795/96)
- Boettger – Oskar Boettger (1833–1910)
- Boetticher – Hans von Boetticher (1886–1958)
- Bogert – Charles Mitchill Bogert (1908–1992) herpetology
- Bohadsch – Johann Baptist Bohadsch (1724–1768) marine zoology
- Boheman – Carl Henrik Boheman (1796–1868)
- F. Boie – Friedrich Boie (1789–1870) general zoology (mainly ornithology, entomology)
- H. Boie – Heinrich Boie (1794–1827) general zoology (mainly herpetology)
- Boisduval – Jean Baptiste Boisduval (1799–1879)
- Bolle – Carl Bolle (1821–1909)
- Bolotsky – Yuri L. Bolotsky
- Bolton – Barry Bolton – entomology
- Bonaparte – Charles Lucien Jules Laurent Bonaparte (1794–1857) ornithology
- J. Bonaparte – José Bonaparte (1928–2020) paleontology (South American dinosaurs)
- Bond – James Bond (1900–1989) ornithology
- Bonelli – Franco Andrea Bonelli (1784–1830) ornithology, entomology
- Bonhote – J. Lewis Bonhote (1875–1922)
- Bonnaterre – Pierre Joseph Bonnaterre (1747–1804)
- Born – Ignaz von Born (1742–1791)
- Borkhausen – Moritz Balthasar Borkhausen (1760–1806)
- Borodin – Nikolai Andreyevich Borodin (1861–1937)
- Borsuk-Bialynicka – Maria Magdalena Borsuk-Białynicka
- Bosc – Louis Augustin Guillaume Bosc (1759–1828)
- Boucard – Adolphe Boucard (1839–1905)
- Bouček – Zdeněk Bouček entomology
- Boulenger – George Albert Boulenger (1858–1937)
- Bourguignat – Jules René Bourguignat (1829–1892)malacology
- Boursin – Charles Boursin (1901–1971)
- Bourcier – Jules Bourcier (1797–1873)
- Bouvier – Eugène Louis Bouvier (1856–1944)
- Bowdich – Thomas Edward Bowdich (1791–1824)
- Bowerbank – James Scott Bowerbank (1797–1877)
- Branch – William Roy Branch (1946–2018), Herpetology
- Brandt – Johann Friedrich von Brandt (1802–1879)
- Brauer – Friedrich Moritz Brauer (1832–1904)
- Brauner – Aleksandr Aleksandrovich Brauner (1857–1941)
- A.E. Brehm – Alfred Brehm (1829–1884) general zoology
- C.L. Brehm – Christian Ludwig Brehm (1787–1864) ornithology
- Bremer – Otto Vasilievich Bremer (died 1873)
- Bremi-Wolf – Johann Jacob Bremi-Wolf (1791–1857)
- Brett-Surman – Michael K. Brett-Surman (born 1950)
- Brevoort – James Carson Brevoort (1818–1887)
- Brewster – William Brewster (1851–1919) ornithology
- Briggs – John Carmon Briggs (born 1920)
- Brischke – Carl Gustav Alexander Brischke (1814–1897)
- Brisson – Mathurin Jacques Brisson (1723–1806)
- Brittinger – Christian Casimir Brittinger (1795–1869)
- Brodkorb – Pierce Brodkorb ornithology, paleontology
- Brøndsted – Holger Valdemar Brøndsted (1893–1977) zoology
- Brongniart – Alexandre Brongniart (1770–1847) paleontology
- C. Brongniart – Charles Jules Edmée Brongniart (1859–1899) paleontology, entomology
- Bronn – Heinrich Georg Bronn (1800–1862)
- Brooke – Victor Brooke (1843–1891)
- Brookes – Joshua Brookes (1761–1833) general zoology
- W.S. Brooks – Winthrop Sprague Brooks (1887–1965)
- Broom – Robert Broom (1866–1951)
- Brown – Barnum Brown (1873–1963)
- Bruch – Carl Friedrich Bruch (1789–1857)
- Bruguière – Jean Guillaume Bruguière (1749–1798)
- Brullé – Gaspard Auguste Brullé (1809–1873)
- Brünnich – Morten Thrane Brünnich (1737–1827)
- Brusatte – Stephen L. Brusatte (born 1984)
- Brusina – Spiridon Brusina (1845–1909)
- H. Bryant – Henry Bryant (1820–1867) general zoology (mainly birds)
- Bryk – Felix Bryk (1882–1957)
- W.E. Bryant – Walter E. Bryant (1861–1905)
- Bücherl – Wolfgang Bücherl
- Buckland – William Buckland (1784–1856)
- Buffetaut – Eric Buffetaut (born 1950)
- Buller – Walter Buller (1838–1906)
- Bunzel – Emanuel Bunzel (1828–1895)
- Burchell – William John Burchell (1782–1863)
- Burge – Donald L. Burge
- Burmeister – Hermann Burmeister (1807–1892)
- Burnett – Gilbert Thomas Burnett (1800–1835)
- Burton – Frederic Burton
- Burns – John McLauren Burns
- Bush – Katharine Jeanette Bush (1855–1937)
- Bussing fl. 1966 (x2)
- Butler – Arthur Gardiner Butler (1844–1925)
- Büttikofer – Johann Büttikofer (1850–1929)
- Buturlin – Sergei Aleksandrovich Buturlin (1872–1938)
- Byrne fl. 1909

== C ==
- Cabanis – Jean Cabanis (1816–1906)
- Cabrera – Ángel Cabrera (1879–1960)
- Caldwell – David Keller Caldwell (1928–1990)
- Caldwell – John S. Caldwell (1911–1990) (entomologist)
- Calman – William Thomas Calman (1871–1952)
- Calvert – Philip Powell Calvert (1871–1961)
- Calvo – Jorge Calvo (born 1961)
- Cambiaso – Andrea Cambiaso
- Camerano – Lorenzo Camerano (1856–1917)
- Cameron – Peter Cameron (1847–1912) entomology
- Camp – Charles Lewis Camp (1893–1975)
- Campos – Diógenes de Almeida Campos
- Canestrini – Giovanni Canestrini (1835–1900)
- Cantor, Cant. – Theodore Edward Cantor (1809–1860)
- Caradja – Aristide Caradja (1861–1955)
- Carlson – Bruce A. Carlson
- Carlsson – Albertina Carlsson (1848–1930)
- Carpenter – Kenneth Carpenter (born 1949)
- Carr – Archie Carr (1909–1987)
- Carriker – Melbourne Armstrong Carriker Jr. (1879–1965)
- Carter – Henry John Carter (1813–1895)
- Carvalho – Ismar de Souza Carvalho
- Casey – Thomas Lincoln Casey, Jr. (1857–1925)
- Cassin – John Cassin (1813–1869)
- Castellanos - Zulma Ageitos de Castellanos (1922-2010)
- Castelnau – see Laporte
- Cervigón – Fernando Cervigón (1930–2017)
- Chabanaud – Paul Chabanaud (1876–1959)
- Chabaud – Alain Chabaud (1923–2013) parasitology
- Chamberlin – Ralph Vary Chamberlin (1879–1967)
- J.C.Chamberlin – Joseph Conrad Chamberlin (1898 – 1962)
- Chapin – James Chapin (1889–1964)
- Chapman – Frank Chapman (1864–1945)
- Charig – Alan Jack Charig (1927–1997)
- Charitonov – Dmitry Evstratievich Kharitonov (1896–1970)
- Charpentier – Toussaint de Charpentier (1779–1847)
- Chasen – Frederick Nutter Chasen (1896–1942)
- Chatterjee – Sankar Chatterjee (born 1943)
- Cherrie – George Kruck Cherrie (1865–1946)
- Chevrolat – Louis Alexandre Auguste Chevrolat (1799–1884) entomology
- Chiaie – Stefano delle Chiaje (1794–1860)
- Chiappe – Luis M. Chiappe
- Children – John George Children (1777–1852)
- Christ – Johann Ludwig Christ (1739–1813)
- Chun – Carl Chun (1852–1914)
- Chure – Daniel Joseph Chure
- Clapp – Cornelia Clapp (1849–1934)
- E. Clark – Eugenie Clark (1922–2015) ichthyology
- H.L. Clark – Hubert Lyman Clark (1870–1947) echinoderms
- J.M. Clark – James Michael Clark
- Clemens – James Brackenridge Clemens
- Clements – Kendall D. Clements
- Clemmer – Glenn H. Clemmer
- Clench – Harry Kendon Clench (1925–1979) Lepidoptera
- Clench – William J. Clench (1897–1984) malacology
- Clerck – Carl Alexander Clerck (1709–1765)
- Cloward – Karen C. Cloward
- Cobbold – Thomas Spencer Cobbold (1828–1886)
- Cochran – Doris M. Cochran (1898–1968)
- Cockerell – Theodore Dru Alison Cockerell (1866–1948)
- Coimbra-Filho – Adelmar Faria Coimbra-Filho
- Colbert – Edwin Harris Colbert (1905–2001)
- Colston – Peter R. Colston (born 1935)
- Compagno – Leonard J. V. Compagno (fl. 1979–present)
- Conci – Cesare Conci (1920–2011)
- Conde – Otto Conde (1905–1944)
- Conover – Henry Boardman Conover (1892–1950)
- Conrad – Timothy Abbott Conrad (1803–1877)
- Coombs – Walter P. Coombs, Jr.
- Cooper, J.G. Cooper – James Graham Cooper (1830–1902) general zoology, particularly ornithology
- Cooper, W. Cooper – William Cooper (1798–1864) malacology
- Cope – Edward Drinker Cope (1840–1897)
- Coquerel – Charles Coquerel (1822–1867)
- Coria – Rodolfo Coria (born 1959)
- Cornalia – Emilio Cornalia (1824–1882)
- Cory – Charles B. Cory (1857–1921)
- Costa – Achille Costa (1823–1898) entomology, particularly Neuroptera
- O. Costa, O.G. Costa – Oronzio Gabriele Costa (1787–1867) entomology and general zoology
- W.J.E.M. Costa – Wilson José Eduardo Moreira da Costa
- Coues – Elliott Coues (1842–1899)
- Cramer – Pieter Cramer (1721–c. 1779) entomology
- F. Cramer – Frank Cramer
- Crampton – William G. R. Crampton
- Cresson – Ezra Townsend Cresson (Senior) (1838–1926) Hymenoptera
- Cresson – Ezra Townsend Cresson, Jr. (1876–1948) Diptera
- Cretzschmar – Philipp Jakob Cretzschmar (1786–1845)
- Crewe – Henry Harpur-Crewe (1828–1883)
- Crotch – George Robert Crotch (1842–1874)
- Crowson – Roy Crowson (1914–1999)
- Crusafont – Miquel Crusafont i Pairó (1910–1983)
- Currie – Philip J. Currie (born 1949)
- Curry Rogers – Kristina Curry Rogers (born 1974)
- Curtis – John Curtis (1791–1862)
- Cuvier – Georges Cuvier (1769–1832) vertebrate zoology, paleontology
- F. Cuvier – Frédéric Cuvier (1773–1838)
- Czerkas – Stephen A. Czerkas

== D ==
- da Costa – Emanuel Mendes da Costa (1717–1791) malacology
- da Silva – Maria Nazareth F. da Silva (fl. 1990s–present)
- Darwin – Charles Darwin (1809–1882)
- Dahl – Friedrich Dahl (1856–1929)
- Dahlbom – Anders Gustaf Dahlbom (1808–1859)
- Dale – James Charles Dale (1792–1872)
- Dall – William Healey Dall (1845–1927)
- Dalla Torre – Karl Wilhelm von Dalla Torre (1850–1928)
- Dana – James Dwight Dana (1813–1895)
- Daudin – François Marie Daudin (1774–1804)
- David – Armand David (1826–1900)
- Davis – Donald R. Davis (born 1934)
- de Azevedo – Sérgio Alex Kugland de Azevedo
- de Beaufort – Lieven Ferdinand de Beaufort (1879–1968)
- de Blainville – Henri Marie Ducrotay de Blainville (1777–1850)
- de Castelnau – see Laporte
- de Filippi – Filippo de Filippi (1814–1867)
- de Geer, De Geer – Charles De Geer (1720–1778)
- de Haan – Wilhem de Haan (1801–1855)
- De Kay, DeKay, Dekay – James Ellsworth De Kay (1792–1851)
- de Man – Johannes Govertus de Man (1850–1930)
- de Naurois – René de Naurois (1906–2006)
- de Nicéville – Lionel de Nicéville (1852–1901)
- De Pourtalès – Louis François de Pourtalès (1824–1880)
- Bory de Saint-Vincent – Jean Baptiste Bory de Saint-Vincent (1780–1846)
- de Valai – Silvina de Valai
- De Vis – Charles Walter De Vis (1829–1915)
- de Winton – William Edward de Winton (1856–1922)
- Dejean, Dej. – Pierre François Marie Auguste Dejean (1780–1845) entomology
- Delmonte – Alfred Delmonte (born 1977)
- Delacour – Jean Théodore Delacour (1890–1985)
- Delson – Eric Delson
- Denis – Michael Denis (1729–1800)
- Depéret – Charles Depéret (1854–1929)
- Deppe – Ferdinand Deppe (1794–1861)
- Des Murs – Marc Athanase Parfait Œillet des Murs (1804–1878)
- Desfontaines – René Louiche Desfontaines (1750–1833)
- Desmarest – Anselme Gaëtan Desmarest (1784–1838)
- Deville, E. Deville – Émile Deville
- Diard – Pierre-Médard Diard (1794–1863)
- Dieffenbach – Ernst Dieffenbach (1811–1855)
- Dingus – Lowell Dingus
- Distant – William Lucas Distant (1845–1922)
- Djakonov – Alexander Michailovitsch Djakonov (1886–1956)
- Dobson – George Edward Dobson (1844–1895)
- Döderlein – Petar Döderlein (1809–1895)
- Dodson – Peter Dodson (fl. 1980s–present)
- Doherty – William Doherty (1857–1901)
- Dollman – Guy Dollman (1886–1942)
- Dollo – Louis Dollo (1857–1931)
- Donisthorpe, Donis. – Horace Donisthorpe (1870–1951)
- Donovan – Edward Donovan (1768–1837)
- d'Orbigny – Alcide d'Orbigny (1802–1857)
- Dong – Zhiming Dong (born 1937)
- Doria – Giacomo Doria (1840–1913)
- Doubleday – Henry Doubleday (1808–1875)
- Douglas – John William Douglas (1814–1905)
- Drenowsky – Alexander Kirilow Drenowski (1879–1967)
- Drury – Dru Drury (1725–1804)
- du Bus de Gisignies – Bernard du Bus de Gisignies (1808–1874)
- du Chaillu – Paul Belloni Du Chaillu (1831–1903)
- Dubois, C. F. Dubois – Charles Frédéric Dubois (1804–1867)
- Dufour – Léon Jean Marie Dufour (1780–1865)
- Dufresne – Louis Dufresne
- Duftschmid – Caspar Erasmus Duftschmid (1767–1821)
- Dugès – Alfredo Dugès (1826–1910)
- A.M.C. Duméril – André Marie Constant Duméril (1774–1860)
- A.H.A. Duméril – Auguste Duméril (1812–1870)
- Dumont – Charles Dumont de Sainte-Croix (1758–1830)
- Duncker – Paul Georg Egmont Duncker (1870–1953)
- Duponchel – Philogène Auguste Joseph Duponchel (1774–1846)
- Durrell – Gerald Durrell (1925–1995)
- Duvernoy – Georges Louis Duvernoy (1777–1855)
- Dwight – Jonathan Dwight (1858–1929)
- Dyar – Harrison Gray Dyar Jr. (1866–1929)

== E ==
- Earle – Sylvia Alice Earle (born 1935)
- Eaton – Jeffrey Glenn Eaton (born 1948)
- Edwards – William Henry Edwards (1822–1909)
- Ehrenberg – Christian Gottfried Ehrenberg (1795–1876)
- Eichwald – Karl Eichwald (1795–1876)
- Eigenmann – Carl H. Eigenmann (1863–1927)
- R.S. Eigenmann, R. Smith – Rosa Smith Eigenmann (1858–1947)
- Ellerman – John Ellerman (1910–1973)
- Elliot – Daniel Giraud Elliot (1835–1915)
- Emery – Carlo Emery (1848–1925)
- A.R. Emery – Alan R. Emery
- Enslin – Eduard Enslin (1879–1970)
- Erdős – József Erdös
- Erichson – Wilhelm Ferdinand Erichson (1809–1848)
- Erséus – Christer Erséus
- Erxleben – Johann Christian Polycarp Erxleben (1744–1777)
- Esben-Petersen – Peter Esben-Petersen (1869–1942)
- Eschmeyer – William N. Eschmeyer (1939–2024)
- Eschscholtz – Johann Friedrich von Eschscholtz (1793–1831)
- Esper – Eugenius Johann Christoph Esper (1742–1810)
- Euphrasen – Bengt Anders Euphrasén (1755–1796)
- Evermann – Barton Warren Evermann (1853–1932)
- Eversmann – Eduard Friedrich Eversmann (1794–1860)
- Evseenko – Sergei Afanasievich Evseenko (1949-2020)
- Eyton – Thomas Campbell Eyton (1809–1880)

== F ==
- Fabre – Jean-Henri Casimir Fabre (1823–1915)
- Fabricius – Johan Christian Fabricius (1745–1808)
- Fage – Louis Fage (1883–1964)
- Fahringer – Josef Fahringer (1876–1950)
- Fåhraeus – Olof Immanuel von Fåhraeus (1796–1884)
- Fairmaire – Léon Fairmaire (1820–1906)
- Falla – Robert Falla (1901–1979)
- Fallén – Carl Fredrik Fallén (1764–1830)
- Fauvel – Charles Adolphe Albert Fauvel (1840–1921) insects
- Fauvel – Pierre Fauvel (1866–1958) Polychaetes
- Feinberg – Margaret Norma Feinberg
- C. Felder – Baron Cajetan von Felder (1814–1894) Lepidoptera
- R. Felder – Rudolf Felder (1842–1871) Lepidoptera
- Fenwick – Jack Fenwick
- Fernandes-Matioli – Flora Maria de Campos Fernandes-Matioli
- Ferrari-Perez – Fernando Ferrari-Pérez (1857–1933)
- Ferraris – Carl J. Ferraris Jr.
- Férussac – Jean Baptiste Louis d'Audibert de Férussac (1745–1815)
- Filhol – Henri Filhol (1843–1902)
- Finsch – Otto Finsch (1839–1917)
- Fioroni – Pio Fioroni (1933–2003)
- G. Fischer, Fischer de Waldheim, Fischer von Waldheim – Gotthelf Fischer von Waldheim (1771–1853)
- J. Fischer – Johann Baptist Fischer (1803–1832)
- J.G. Fischer – Johann Gustav Fischer (1819–1889)
- M. Fischer – Maximilian Fischer (born 1929)
- Fitch – Asa Fitch (1809–1879)
- Fitzinger – Leopold Fitzinger (1802–1884)
- J.H. Fleming – James Henry Fleming (1872–1940)
- Fleming – John Fleming (1785–1857)
- Fonscolombe – Étienne Laurent Joseph Hippolyte Boyer de Fonscolombe
- Forbes – Edward Forbes (1815–1854)
- Forbes – Henry Ogg Forbes (1851–1932)
- Forel – Auguste-Henri Forel (1848–1931)
- Forsius – Runar Forsius (1884–1935)
- Forsskål – Peter Forsskål (1732–1763)
- Forsyth Major – Charles Immanuel Forsyth Major (1843–1923)
- Forster – Johann Reinhold Forster (1729–1798)
- C.A. Forster – Catherine A. Forster
- G. Forster – Georg Forster (1754–1794)
- R.R. Forster – Raymond Robert Forster (1922–2000)
- Förster – Arnold Förster (1810–1884)
- Fourmanoir – Pierre Fourmanoir (1924–2007)
- Fowler – Henry Weed Fowler (1879–1965)
- Fox – Wade Fox (1920–1964)
- Fraas – Eberhard Fraas (1862–1915)
- Franganillo-Balboa – Pelegrin Franganillo-Balboa (1873–1955)
- Franklin – James Franklin (c. 1783–1834)
- Fransen – Charles Fransen
- Fraser – Louis Fraser (1810–1866)
- F.C. Fraser – Frederick Charles Fraser
- Freyer – Christian Friedrich Freyer (1794–1885) entomologist mainly interested in Lepidoptera
- Friedmann – Herbert Friedmann (1900–1987)
- Fricke – Ronald Fricke
- Frivaldszky – Imre Frivaldszky (1799–1870)
- Frohawk – Frederick William Frohawk (1861–1946)
- Fromont – Jane Fromont
- Fruhstorfer – Hans Fruhstorfer (1866–1922)
- Fürbringer – Max Fürbringer (1846–1920)
- Füssli, Fuessly, Füsslins – Johann Kaspar Füssli (1743–1786)

== G ==
- Gadow – Hans Friedrich Gadow (1855–1928)
- Gahan – Charles Joseph Gahan (1862–1939) for Cerambycidae or Arthur Burton Gahan (1880—1960) for Hymenoptera
- Gaimard – Joseph Paul Gaimard (1796–1858)
- F. Galton, Galton – Francis Galton (1822–1911)
- P. M. Galton – Peter Galton
- Gambel – William Gambel (1823–1849)
- Gao – Keqin Gao (born 1955)
- Garman – Samuel Garman (1843–1927)
- Garnot – Prosper Garnot (1794–1838)
- Garstang – Walter Garstang (1868–1949)
- Gaston – Robert Gaston (born 1967)
- Gasparini – Zulma Brandoni de Gasparini
- Gauthier – Jacques Gauthier (born 1948)
- Gegenbaur – Carl Gegenbaur (1825–1903)
- Gené – Giuseppe Gené (1800–1847)
- Genise – Jorge Fernando Genise
- É. Geoffroy Saint-Hilaire – Étienne Geoffroy Saint-Hilaire (1772–1844)
- I. Geoffroy Saint-Hilaire – Isidore Geoffroy Saint-Hilaire (1805–1861)
- Georgi – Johann Gottlieb Georgi (1729–1802)
- Germar – Ernst Friedrich Germar (1786–1853)
- Gerstäcker – Carl Eduard Adolph Gerstäcker (1828–1895)
- Gertsch – Willis J. Gertsch (1906–1998)
- Gervais – Paul Gervais (1816–1879)
- Géry – Jacques Géry ichthyology
- Geyer – Carl Geyer entomology
- Geyer – Charles Andreas Geyer (1809–1853) botany, American
- Gielis – Cees Gielis
- Giglioli – Enrico Hillyer Giglioli (1845–1909)
- Gilbert – Charles Henry Gilbert (1859–1928)
- Gilchrist – John Dow Fisher Gilchrist (1866–1926)
- Gill – Theodore Nicholas Gill (1837–1914)
- Gillette – David Gillette
- Gilmore – Charles W. Gilmore (1874–1945)
- Girard – Charles Frédéric Girard (1822–1895)
- Giraud – Joseph Etienne Giraud (1808–1877)
- Girault – Alec Arsène Girault entomology
- Gloger – Constantin Wilhelm Lambert Gloger (1803–1863)
- Gmelin – Johann Friedrich Gmelin (1748–1804)
- Godart – Jean-Baptiste Godart (1775–1825)
- Godefroit – Pascal Godefroit
- Godman – Frederick DuCane Godman (1834–1919)
- Goeze – Johann August Ephraim Goeze (1731–1793)
- Göhlich – Ursula Bettina Göhlich
- Goldfuss – Georg August Goldfuss (1782–1848)
- Goldman – E. A. Goldman
- Goode – George Brown Goode (1851–1896)
- Gosse – Philip Henry Gosse (1810–1888)
- A. A. Gould – Augustus Addison Gould (1805–1866) conchology
- Gould – John Gould (1804–1881) birds and mammals
- Graffin – Greg Graffin (1964–present) paleozoology/evolutionary biology
- A. Grandidier – Alfred Grandidier (1836–1921)
- G. Grandidier – Guillaume Grandidier (1873–1957)
- Grandin – Temple Grandin (born 1947)
- Granger – Walter W. Granger (1872–1941)
- Grant – Chapman Grant (1887–1983) herpetology
- Grant – Ulysses S. Grant IV (1893–1977) malacology, paleontology
- Gravenhorst – Johann Ludwig Christian Gravenhorst (1777–1857)
- A. R. Gray - Andrew Robert Gray (born 1963)
- M. R. Gray - Michael R. Gray (1941 -2023) arachnology
- G. R. Gray – George Robert Gray (1808–1872) entomology, ornithology
- J. E. Gray – John Edward Gray (1800–1875)
- Green – Edward Ernest Green (1861–1949)
- Gregory – William K. Gregory (1876–1970)
- Griffith – Edward Griffith (1790–1858)
- J. N. Griffith – Jeremy Griffith (born 1945)
- Grimpe – Georg Grimpe (1889–1936)
- Grinnell – Joseph Grinnell (1877–1939)
- Griscom – Ludlow Griscom (1890–1959)
- Grobben – Karl Grobben (1854–1945)
- Gronow – Laurence Theodore Gronow (fl. 1854) ichthyology
- A. Grote, Grote – Augustus Radcliffe Grote (1841–1903) entomology
- H. Grote – Hermann Grote ornithology
- Grube – Adolph Eduard Grube (1812–1880) zoology
- Grumm-Grzhimailo – Grigory Grum-Grshimailo (1860–1936) entomology
- Guenee, Guenée – Achille Guenée (1809–1880)
- Guerin, Guérin-Méneville – Félix Édouard Guérin-Méneville (1799–1874)
- Güldenstädt – Johann Anton Güldenstädt (1745–1781)
- Gunnerus – Johann Ernst Gunnerus (1718–1773)
- Gunter – Gordon P. Gunter (1909–1998)
- Günther – Albert C. L. G. Günther (1830–1914)
- Gurney – John Henry Gurney (1819–1890)
- J. H. Gurney Jr – John Henry Gurney Jr. (1848–1922)
- Gyllenhaal – Leonard Gyllenhaal (1752–1840)

== H ==
- Habe – Tadashige Habe (1916–2001)
- Hiren – Hiren B Parmar (born 1985)
- Hablizl – Carl Ludwig Hablitz (1752–1821)
- Hachisuka – Masauji Hachisuka (1903–1953)
- Hadiaty – Renny Kurnia Hadiaty
- Hadie – Wartono Hadie
- Haeckel – Ernst Haeckel (1834–1919)
- Hagen – Hermann August Hagen (1817–1893)
- Hahn – Carl Wilhelm Hahn (1786–1835)
- Haldeman – Samuel Stehman Haldeman (1812–1880)
- Haliday – Alexander Henry Haliday (1807–1870)
- Hallowell – Edward Hallowell (1808–1860) herpetology
- Hamilton, Hamilton-Buchanan – Francis Buchanan-Hamilton (1762–1829)
- Hammer – William R. Hammer
- Hampson – George Hampson (1860–1936)
- Handlirsch – Anton Handlirsch (1865–1935)
- Hanley – Sylvanus Charles Thorp Hanley (1819–1899)
- Hansemann – Johann Wilhelm Adolf Hansemann (1784–1862)
- Hansen – Hans Jacob Hansen (1855–1936)
- Harcourt – Edward William Vernon Harcourt (1825–1891)
- Hardwicke – Thomas Hardwicke (1755–1835)
- Harlan – Richard Harlan (1796–1843)
- Harper – Francis Harper (1886–1972)
- Harris, M. Harris – Moses Harris (1734–1785) entomology
- T.W. Harris – Thaddeus Williams Harris (1795–1856)
- Harrison – Colin James Oliver Harrison (1926–2003)
- Hartert – Ernst Hartert (1859–1933)
- Hartig – Theodor Hartig (1805–1880)
- Hartlaub – Gustav Hartlaub (1814–1900)
- Hassall – Arthur Hill Hassall (1817–1894)
- Haswell – William Aitcheson Haswell (1854–1925)
- Hatcher – John Bell Hatcher (1861–1904)
- Hatschek – Berthold Hatschek (1854–1941)
- Haubold – Hartmut Haubold
- Haworth – Adrian Hardy Haworth (1767–1833)
- Hay – William Perry Hay (1872–1947)
- Hayman – Robert William Hayman
- Head – Jason James Head
- Heads – Sam W. Heads
- Heaney – Lawrence Richard Heaney
- Heckel – Johann Jakob Heckel (1790–1857)
- Hector – James Hector (1834–1907)
- Heemstra – Phillip C. Heemstra
- Hellén – Wolter Edward Hellén (1890–1979)
- Heller – Joseph Heller (born 1941)
- Hellmayr – Carl Edward Hellmayr (1878–1944)
- Hemprich – Wilhelm Hemprich (1796–1825)
- Henle – Friedrich Gustav Jakob Henle (1809–1885)
- Henshaw – Henry Wetherbee Henshaw (1850–1930)
- Hentz – Nicholas Marcellus Hentz (1797–1856)
- Herbst – Johann Friedrich Wilhelm Herbst (1743–1807)
- Herdman – William Abbott Herdman (1858–1924)
- Hering – Erich Martin Hering (1893–1967)
- Herman – Ottó Herman (1835–1914)
- Hermann – Johann Hermann (1738–1800)
- Herre – Albert William Christian Theodore Herre (1869–1962)
- Herrich-Schäffer – Gottlieb August Wilhelm Herrich-Schäffer (1799–1874)
- Hershkovitz – Philip Hershkovitz (1909–1997)
- Hertlein – Leo George Hertlein (1898–1972)
- Heude – Pierre Marie Heude (1836–1902)
- Heuglin – Theodor von Heuglin (1824–1876)
- Heuvelmans – Bernard Heuvelmans (1916–2001)
- Hewitson – William Chapman Hewitson (1806–1878)
- Heydenreich – Gustav Heinrich Heydenreich (fl. mid-19th century)
- Heymons – Richard Heymons (1867–1943)
- Hildebrand – Samuel Frederick Hildebrand (1883–1949)
- Hilgendorf – Franz Martin Hilgendorf (1839–1904)
- Hilsenberg – Carl Theodor Hilsenberg (1802–1824)
- Hinton – Martin Hinton (1883–1961)
- Hirohito – Shōwa Emperor Hirohito (1901–1989)
- Hirst – Arthur Stanley Hirst (1883–1930) arachnology, British
- Hirst – David B. Hirst arachnology, Australian
- Hiyama – Yoshio Hiyama (1909–1988)
- Hodgson – Brian Houghton Hodgson (1800–1894)
- Hoese – Douglass F. Hoese
- Hoffmannsegg – Johann Centurius Hoffmannsegg (1766–1849)
- Hoffstetter – Robert Hoffstetter (fl. 19th century)
- Holbrook – John Edwards Holbrook (1794–1871)
- Holland – William Jacob Holland (1848–1932)
- Holmberg – Eduardo Ladislao Holmberg (1852–1937)
- Holmgren – August Emil Holmgren (1829–1888)
- Holmgren (N.Holmgren) Nils Holmgren (1877–1954)
- Holthuis – Lipke Bijdeley Holthuis (1921–2008)
- Hombron – Jacques Bernard Hombron (1798–1852)
- Honrath – Eduard Honrath (1837–1893)
- Hope – Frederick William Hope (1797–1862)
- Horn – George Henry Horn (1840–1897)
- W. Horn – Walther Hermann Richard Horn (1871–1939)
- Horner – Jack Horner (born 1946)
- Horsfield – Thomas Horsfield (1773–1859)
- Horváth – Géza Horváth (1847–1937)
- Hose – Charles Hose (1863–1929)
- Hottinger – Lukas Hottinger (1933–2011)
- Houttuyn – Martinus Houttuyn (1720–1798)
- Howard – Hildegarde Howard (1901–1998)
- Howell, A.H. Howell – Arthur H. Howell (1872–1940)
- Howes – William George Howes (1879–1946)
- Hoyle – William Evans Hoyle (1855–1926)
- Hu – Yaoming Hu
- Hübner – Jacob Hübner (1761–1826)
- Hubbs – Carl Leavitt Hubbs (1894–1979)
- Huene, von Huene – Friedrich von Huene (1875–1969)
- Huey – Laurence Markham Huey (1892–1963)
- Hulke – John Whitaker Hulke (1830–1895)
- Hume – Allan Octavian Hume (1829–1912)
- Humphrey – Philip Strong Humphrey (1926–2009)
- Hunt – Adrian P. Hunt
- Hürzeler – Johannes Hürzeler
- Hutt – Steve Hutt
- J.S. Huxley – Julian Sorell Huxley (1887–1975) general zoology
- T.H. Huxley – Thomas Henry Huxley (1825–1895) general zoology
- Hwang – Sunny H. Hwang

== I ==
- Ida – Hitoshi Ida (born 1940)
- Iredale – Tom Iredale (1880–1972)
- Illiger – Johann Karl Wilhelm Illiger (1775–1813)
- Ivantsoff – Walter Ivantsoff
- Ivie – Michael Aaron Ivie
- Ivie – Wilton Ivie
- Iwai – Tamotsu Iwai

== J ==
- Jacobs – Jean-Charles Jacobs (1821–1907) entomology (Diptera, Hymenoptera)
- Jacquin – Nicolaus Joseph von Jacquin (1727–1817) mainly tropical American taxa
- Jacquinot – Honoré Jacquinot (1815–1887) mainly marine biology
- Jain – Sohan Lal Jain vertebrate paleontology
- Jakowlew – Alexander Ivanovich Yakovlev (1863–1909)
- James – Helen F. James (paleo)ornithology
- Jameson – Robert Jameson (1774–1854) general zoology
- Jamieson – Alan J. Jamieson (marine biologist)
- Janensch – Werner Janensch (1878–1969) vertebrate paleontology (East African sauropods)
- Janson – Oliver Erichson Janson (1850–1926) entomology (Coleoptera)
- Jardine – William Jardine (1800–1874) general zoology
- Jebb – Matthew H. P. Jebb
- Jeffreys – John Gwyn Jeffreys (1809–1885)
- Jekel – Henri Jekel (1816–1891)
- Jenkins – James Travis Jenkins (1876–1959)
- A. P. Jenkins – Aaron Peter Jenkins
- Jensen – James A. Jensen (1918–1998) vertebrate paleontology
- Jerdon – Thomas C. Jerdon (1811–1872) general zoology (South Asia)
- Q. Ji – Ji Qiang
- S. Ji – Shuan Ji
- Jiménez de la Espada – Marcos Jiménez de la Espada (1831–1898) vertebrate zoology
- Jocqué – Rudy Jocqué
- G. D. Johnson – G. David Johnson
- Johnston – George Johnston
- Jordan – David Starr Jordan (1851–1931) ichthyology
- K. Jordan – Karl Jordan (1861–1959) entomology (Coleoptera, Lepidoptera, Siphonaptera)
- Jouanin – Christian Jouanin
- Jourdan – Claude Jourdan

== K ==
- Kaila – Lauri Kaila
- Karg – Wolfgang Karg (1927–2016)
- Karsch – Ferdinand Karsch
- Katayama – Masao Katayama (born 1912)
- Kaup – Johann Jakob Kaup (1803–1873)
- Kay – E. Alison Kay (1928–2008)
- Keferstein – Wilhelm Moritz Keferstein (1833–1870)
- Kelaart – Edward Frederick Kelaart (1819–1860)
- Kellner – Alexander Wilhelm Armin Kellner
- Kellogg – Remington Kellogg (1892–1969)
- L. Kellogg – Vernon Lyman Kellogg (1867–1937)
- Kennard – Frederic Hedge Kennard (1865–1937)
- Kennedy – Clarence Hamilton Kennedy (1879–1952)
- Kennicott – Robert Kennicott (1835–1866)
- Kerr – Robert Kerr (1755–1813)
- Kessler – Karl Fedorovich Kessler (1815–1881)
- Keulemans – John Gerrard Keulemans (1842–1912)
- Keyserling – Eugen von Keyserling (1833–1889)
- Kieffer – Jean-Jacques Kieffer (1857–1925)
- Kielan-Jaworowska – Zofia Kielan-Jaworowska (1925–2015)
- King – Phillip Parker King (1793–1856)
- Kinnear – Norman Boyd Kinnear (1882–1957)
- Kirby – William Kirby (1759–1850)
- W. F. Kirby – William Forsell Kirby (1844–1912)
- Kirkaldy – George Willis Kirkaldy
- Kirkland – James Ian Kirkland (born 1954)
- Kishida – Kyukichi Kishida (1888–1968)
- Kittlitz – Heinrich von Kittlitz (1799–1874)
- O. Kleinschmidt – Otto Kleinschmidt (1870–1954)
- Kloss – Cecil Boden Kloss (1877–1949)
- Klotzsch – Johann Friedrich Klotzsch (1805–1860)
- Klug – Johann Christoph Friedrich Klug (1775–1856)
- Kner – Rudolf Kner (1810–1868)
- Knoch – August Wilhelm Knoch (1742–1818)
- Kobayashi – Yoshitsugu Kobayashi
- C. L. Koch – Carl Ludwig Koch (1778–1857)
- L. Koch – Ludwig Carl Christian Koch (1825–1908)
- Koelz – Walter Norman Koelz (1895–1989)
- Kolbe – Hermann Julius Kolbe (1855–1939)
- Kollar – Vincenz Kollar (1797–1860)
- Kollman – Max Kollmann
- Konings – Ad Konings
- Kono – Hiromichi Kono (1905–1963)
- Konow – Friedrich Wilhelm Konow (1842–1908)
- Korshunov – Yuri Korshunov (1933–2002)
- Kotlyar – Aleksandr N. Kotlyar
- Kotthaus – Adolf Kotthaus
- Kraglievich – Lucas Kraglievich
- Kraatz – Ernst Gustav Kraatz (1831–1909)
- Krauss – Christian Ferdinand Friedrich Krauss (1812–1890)
- Krauss – Hermann August Krauss (1848–1939)
- Krabbe – Niels Krabbe (born 1951)
- Krefft – Johann Ludwig Gerard Krefft (1830–1881)
- Krefft – Gerhard Krefft (1912–1993)
- Kriechbaumer – Joseph Kriechbaumer (1819–1902)
- Krohn – August David Krohn (1803–1891)
- Kropotkin – Peter Kropotkin (1842–1921)
- Ksepka – Daniel T. Ksepka
- Kuhl – Heinrich Kuhl (1797–1821)
- Kuiter – Rudolf Herman Kuiter (born 1943)
- Kulczynski – Władysław Kulczyński (1854−1919)
- Kuroda – Nagamichi Kuroda (1889–1978)
- Kurzanov – Sergei Mikhailovich Kurzanov

== L ==
- Labillardière – Jacques Labillardière (1755–1834)
- Lacépède – Bernard Germain de Lacépède (1756–1825)
- Lacordaire – Jean Théodore Lacordaire (1801–1870)
- Lafresnaye – Frédéric de Lafresnaye (1783–1861)
- Laicharting – Johann Nepomuk von Laicharting (1754–1797)
- Lamarck – Jean-Baptiste Lamarck (1744–1829)
- Lamanna – Matthew Carl Lamanna
- Lambe – Lawrence Morris Lambe (1863–1919)
- Lambrecht – Kálmán Lambrecht
- Lameere – Auguste Lameere (1864–1942)
- Landbeck – Christian Ludwig Landbeck (1807–1890)
- Langer – Max Cardoso Langer
- Langston – Wann Langston, Jr. (1921–2013)
- Laporte – François-Louis Laporte, comte de Castelnau (1802–1880)
- Lapparent, de Lapparent – Albert-Félix de Lapparent (1905–1975)
- LaRoche – Francisco La Roche
- Larson – Helen K. Larson
- Latham – John Latham (1740–1837)
- Latreille – Pierre André Latreille (1762–1833)
- Laurent – Michèle de Saint Laurent (1926–2003) French carcinologist
- Laurenti – Josephus Nicolaus Laurenti (1735–1805)
- Laurillard – Charles Léopold Laurillard (1783–1853)
- Lavocat – René Lavocat
- Lawrence – George Newbold Lawrence (1806–1895)
- Lawrence – Barbara Lawrence (1909–1997)
- R.F. Lawrence – Reginald Frederick Lawrence (1897–1987)
- Laxmann – Erik Laxmann (1737–1796)
- Layard – Edgar Leopold Layard (1824–1900)
- Lea – Arthur Mills Lea (1868–1932)
- LeConte – John Lawrence LeConte (1825–1883)
- Leach – William Elford Leach (1791–1836)
- Leach – Edwin S. Leach (1878–1971)
- Lee – Yuong-Nam Lee
- Leech – John Henry Leech (1862–1900)
- Lehtinen – Pekka T. Lehtinen
- Leidy – Joseph Leidy (1823–1891)
- Leisler – Johann Philipp Achilles Leisler (1771–1813)
- Le Leouff – Jean Le Leouff
- Lembeye – Juan Lembeye (1816–1889)
- Lendzion – Kazimiera Lendzion
- Lepeletier – Amédée Louis Michel le Peletier, comte de Saint-Fargeau (1770–1845)
- Lesson – René-Primevère Lesson (1794–1849)
- Le Souef – Dudley Le Souef (1856–1923)
- Lesueur – Charles Alexandre Lesueur (1778–1846)
- Leuckart – Rudolf Leuckart (1822–1898)
- Leussler – R. A. Leussler
- Li – Li Sizhong (1921–2009)
- C.K. Li (also C.-K. Li or C. Li) – Chuankui Li
- D.Q. Li (also D.-Q. Li or D. Li) – Daqing Li
- P.P. Li (also P.-P. Li or P. Li) – Pipeng Li
- Lichtenstein – Martin Lichtenstein (1780–1867)
- Lilljeborg – Wilhelm Lilljeborg (1816–1908)
- Link – Johann Heinrich Friedrich Link (1767–1850)
- Linnaeus – Carl Linnaeus (1707–1778)
- Lindl. – John Lindley (1799–1865)
- Linsley – Earle Gorton Linsley (1910–2000)
- Lintner – Joseph Albert Lintner (1822–1898)
- Ljungh – Sven Ingemar Ljungh (1757–1828)
- Loche – Victor Loche (1806–1863)
- Lönnberg – Einar Lönnberg (1864–1942)
- Lowe – Richard Thomas Lowe (1802–1874)
- Lowe – Percy Lowe (1870–1948)
- Lowry – James K. Lowry (1942 -
- Y.Y. Lu (also Y.-Y. Lu or Y. Lu) – Yuyan Lu
- Lü (also J.C. Lü, J.-C. Lü or J. Lü) – Junchang Lü
- S.Q. Lü (also S.-Q. Lü or S. Lü) – Shunqin Lü
- Lubbock – John Lubbock, 1st Baron Avebury (1834–1913)
- Luc – Michel Luc (1927–2010) nematology
- Lucas – Hippolyte Lucas (1814–1899)
- F.A. Lucas – Frederic Augustus Lucas (1852–1929)
- S.G. Lucas – Spencer G. Lucas
- Lull – Richard Swann Lull (1867–1957)
- Lund – Peter Wilhelm Lund (1801–1880)
- Lütken – Christian Frederik Lütken (1827–1901)
- Lydekker – Richard Lydekker (1849–1915)
- Lyon – Marcus Ward Lyon, Jr. (1875–1942)

== M ==
- Mabile – Jules François Mabille (1831–1904)
- Macleay – William John Macleay (1820–1891)
- Mackovicky – Peter J. Mackovicky
- Makela – Robert R. Makela (1940–1987)
- Malaise – René Malaise (1892–1978)
- Maleev – Evgenii Aleksandrovich Maleev (1915–1966)
- Mannerheim – Carl Gustaf Mannerheim (1797–1854)
- Mantell – Gideon Mantell (1790–1852)
- Marcus – Ernst Marcus (1893–1968)
- Marinescu – Florian Marinescu
- Markevich – Aleksandr Prokofyevich Markevich (1905–1999)
- Marples – Brian J. Marples
- Marsh – Othniel Charles Marsh (1831–1899)
- Marshall – Guy Anstruther Knox Marshall (1871–1959)
- Marhsall – Thomas Ansell Marshall (1827–1903)
- Martill – David Martill
- Martin – William Charles Linnaeus Martin (1798–1864) mainly mammals
- C. Martin – Claro Martin
- L. Martin – Larry Martin (1943–2013) paleontology
- Martinez – Ruben D. Martinez
- R. Martínez Escarbassiere – Rafael Martínez Escarbassiere (1929–2022)
- Marvin – Nigel Marven (born 1960)
- Maryanska – Teresa Maryańska
- Mason – Francis Mason (1799–1874)
- Massy – Anne Letitia Massy (1867–1931)
- Mateus – Octávio Mateus (born 1975)
- Mathews – Gregory Mathews (1876–1949)
- Matley – Charles Alfred Matley (1866–1947)
- Matschie – Paul Matschie (1861–1926)
- Matsubara – Kiyomatsu Matsubara (1907–1968)
- Matsumura – Shōnen Matsumura (1872–1960)
- Matsuura – Keiichi Matsuura
- Mayr – Ernst Mayr (1904–2005) vertebrates, mainly birds
- G. Mayr – Gerald Mayr prehistoric vertebrates, mainly birds
- McCulloch – Allan Riverstone McCulloch (1885–1925)
- McLachlan – Robert McLachlan (1837–1904)
- Meade-Waldo – Edmund Meade-Waldo (1855–1934)
- Mearns – Edgar Alexander Mearns (1856–1916)
- Meek – Seth Eugene Meek (1859–1914)
- Meguro – Katsusuke Meguro
- Méhely – Lajos Méhelÿ (1862–1953)
- Meigen – Johann Wilhelm Meigen (1764–1845)
- Mello-Leitão – Cândido Firmino de Mello-Leitão (1886–1948)
- Melsheimer – Frederick Ernst Melsheimer (1782–1873)
- Menezes – Naercio Aquino de Menezes (born 1937)
- Ménétries – Édouard Ménétries (1802–1861)
- Merrem – Blasius Merrem (1761–1824)
- Merrett – Nigel Merrett
- Merriam – Clinton Hart Merriam (1855–1942)
- Mertens – Robert Mertens (1894–1975)
- Metcalfe – John William Metcalfe (1872–1952)
- Metschnikoff, Mechnikov – Ilya Ilyich Mechnikov (1845–1916)
- Meyen – Franz Meyen (1804–1840)
- Meyer, von Meyer – Christian Erich Hermann von Meyer (1801–1869) paleontology
- A.B. Meyer – Adolf Bernhard Meyer (1840–1911) birds, primates, entomology (mainly Wallacea)
- F.A. Meyer, F.A.A. Meyer, Meyer – Friedrich Albrecht Anton Meyer (1768–1795) birds, primates
- Meyer de Schauensee – Rodolphe Meyer de Schauensee (1901–1984) birds
- Meyrick – Edward Meyrick (1854–1938)
- Michener – Charles Duncan Michener (1918–2015)
- Middendorf, Midd. – Alexander von Middendorff (1815–1894)
- Midgley – Steven Hamar Midgley
- Miles – Clifford Miles
- Millard – Naomi A. H. Millard (1914–1997) Hydroida
- Miller – Gerrit Smith Miller Jr. (1869–1956) mammals
- A.H. Miller – Alden H. Miller
- J.F. Miller – John Frederick Miller (1759–1796) mainly vertebrates
- L.H. Miller – Loye H. Miller paleontology, mainly birds
- R.R. Miller – Robert Rush Miller (1916–2003) fish
- Millet – Pierre-Aimé Millet (1783–1873)
- Milne-Edwards – Henri Milne-Edwards (1800–1885) mammals and crustaceans
- A. Milne-Edwards – Alphonse Milne-Edwards (1835–1900) birds
- Milner – Angela C. Milner
- Miranda-Ribeiro – Alípio de Miranda-Ribeiro (1874–1939)
- P. Miranda-Ribeiro – Paulo de Miranda Ribeiro (1901–1965)
- Mitchell – Thomas Mitchell (1792–1855)
- Mitchill – Samuel Latham Mitchill (1764–1831)
- Mitra – Tridib Ranjan Mitra
- Mizuno – Nobuhiko Mizuno
- Mochizuki – Kenji Mochizuki
- Mocsáry – Alexander Mocsáry (1841–1915)
- Mohr – Erna Mohr (1894–1968)
- Molina – Juan Ignacio Molina (1740–1829)
- Molnar – Ralph E. Molnar
- Mondolfi – Edgardo Mondolfi (1918–1999)
- Mones – Álvaro Mones (born 1942)
- Montagu – George Montagu (1753–1815)
- Moore – Frederic Moore (1830–1907) butterflies and moths
- J.C. Moore – Joseph Curtis Moore (1914–1995) rodents
- Mori – Tamezo Mori (1884–1962)
- Moreno – Francisco Moreno (1852–1919)
- Morley – Claude Morley (1874–1951)
- Morrow – James Edwin Morrow, Jr. (born 1918)
- Mortensen – Ole Theodor Jensen Mortensen (1868–1952)
- Möschler – Heinrich Benno Möschler (1831–1888)
- Motomura – Hiroyuki Motomura fish, scorpionfish
- Motschulsky – Victor Ivanovitsch Motschulsky (1810–1871)
- Mound – Laurence Alfred Mound (born 1934)
- Moure – Jesus Santiago Moure (1912–2010)
- Mourer-Chauviré – Cécile Mourer-Chauviré
- Moyer – Jack T. Moyer (1929–2004)
- Muche – Werner Heinz Muche (1911–1987)
- J.P. Müller, Müller – Johannes Peter Müller (1801–1858) mainly fish
- O.F. Müller – Otto Friedrich Müller (1730–1784) insects, fauna of Scandinavia
- Statius Müller, or P.L.S. Müller according to the IUCN – Philipp Ludwig Statius Müller (1725–1776) birds, insects, some mammals and others
- Müller – Salomon Müller (1804–1864) mainly fauna of Indonesia
- Mulsant – Étienne Mulsant (1797–1880)
- Munday – Philip L. Munday
- Muricy – Guilherme Muricy (1964 -) sponges, their chemistry & taxonomy
- Murphy – Robert Cushman Murphy (1887–1973)
- Murray – J. A. Murray
- Muttkowski – Richard Anthony Muttkowski (1887–1943)

== N ==
- Nabokov – Vladimir Nabokov (1899–1977)
- Nadler – Tilo Nadler (born 1941)
- Naef – Adolf Naef (1883–1949)
- Nagao – Takumi Nagao
- Naish – Darren Naish
- J. F. Naumann – Johann Friedrich Naumann (1780–1857)
- Natterer – Johann Natterer (1787–1843)
- Navás – Longinos Navás (1858–1938)
- Nehring – Alfred Nehring (1845–1904)
- Nelson – Edward William Nelson (1855–1934)
- Nelson – Joseph S. Nelson (1937–2011)
- Nesov, Nessov – Lev Alexandrovich Nesov (1947–1995)
- Netting – M. Graham Netting (1904–1996) herpetology
- Neumoegen – Berthold Neumoegen (1845–1895)
- New – Tim R. New
- Newman – Edward Newman (1801–1876)
- A. Newton – Alfred Newton (1829–1907)
- E. Newton – Edward Newton (1832–1897)
- Nichols – Albert Russell Nichols (1859–1933)
- Nichols – John Treadwell Nichols (1883–1958)
- Nielsen – Cesare Nielsen (1898–1984)
- Nikolskii – Aleksandr Mikhailovich Nikolskii (1858–1942)
- Nilsson – Sven Nilsson (1787–1883)
- Nitsche – Hinrich Nitsche (1845–1902)
- Noble – Gladwyn Kingsley Noble (1894–1940)
- Nopcsa – Franz Nopcsa von Felső-Szilvás (1877–1933)
- Norell – Mark A. Norell (born 1957)
- Norman – John Richardson Norman (1899–1944)
- D. Norman – David B. Norman (born 1952)
- North – Alfred John North (1855–1917)
- Novas – Fernando Emilio Novas
- Nowinski – Aleksander Nowiński
- Nuttall – Thomas Nuttall (1786–1859)
- Nylander – William Nylander (1822–1899)

== O ==
- Oberholser – Harry Church Oberholser (1870–1963)
- Oberthür – Charles Oberthür (1845–1924)
- Obraztsov – Nicholas Sergeevitsch Obraztsov (1906–1966)
- Ochiai – Akira Ochiai (1923–2017)
- Ogilby – William Ogilby (1808–1873) general zoology
- J.D. Ogilby – James Douglas Ogilby (1853–1925) ichthyology
- Ogilvie-Grant – William Robert Ogilvie-Grant (1863–1924)
- Ognev – Sergej Ognew (1886–1951)
- Oguma – Mamoru Oguma (1885–1971)
- Okamoto – Makoto Okamoto
- Oken – Lorenz Oken (1779–1851)
- Okumura – Teiichi Okumura
- Olfers – Ignaz von Olfers (1793–1872)
- Oliver – Walter Oliver (1883–1957)
- Olivi – Giuseppe Olivi (1769–1795)
- Olivier – Guillaume-Antoine Olivier (1756–1814)
- Olson – Storrs Olson (1944–2021)
- Oppel – Nicolaus Michael Oppel (1782–1820)
- Ord – George Ord (1781–1866)
- Osbeck – Pehr Osbeck (1723–1805)
- Osborn – Herbert Osborn (1856–1954) entomology
- Osborn – Henry Fairfield Osborn (1857–1935) paleontology
- Osgood – Wilfred Hudson Osgood (1875–1947)
- Osi – Attila Ősi
- Osmólska – Halszka Osmólska (1930–2008)
- Osthelder – Ludwig Osthelder (1877–1954)
- Ostrom – John Ostrom (1928–2005)
- Oudemans – Anthonie Cornelis Oudemans (1858–1943)
- Oustalet – Emile Oustalet (1844–1905)
- Owen – Richard Owen (1804–1892)

== P ==
- Packard – Alpheus Spring Packard (1839–1905) entomology, paleontology
- Palisot de Beauvois – Ambroise Marie François Joseph Palisot, Baron de Beauvois (1752–1820) botany, entomology
- Pallas – Peter Simon Pallas (1741–1811) botany, zoology
- Palmer – Theodore Sherman Palmer (1868–1955)
- Panzer – Georg Wolfgang Franz Panzer (1755–1829) entomology
- Parenti – Lynne R. Parenti
- Parks – William Arthur Parks (1868–1939)
- Pascoe – Francis Polkinghorne Pascoe (1813–1893) entomology
- Patzner – ≠Robert A. Patzner
- Paul – Gregory S. Paul (born 1954)
- Pauly – Alain Pauly (born 1954)
- Pax – Ferdinand Albert Pax (1884–1964)
- Peale – Titian Peale (1799–1885)
- Pease – William Harper Pease (1824–1871)
- Pearson – Oliver Paynie Pearson (1915–2003)
- Pelzeln – August von Pelzeln (1825–1891)
- Pennant – Thomas Pennant (1726–1798)
- M. L. Penrith – Mary-Louise Penrith (born 1942)
- Perez-Moreno – Bernardino P. Pérez-Moreno
- Perle – Altangerel Perle (born 1945)
- Péron – François Péron (1775–1810)
- Perrier – Edmond Perrier (1844–1921)
- Perty – Joseph Anton Maximillian Perty (1804–1884) entomology
- Peters – Wilhelm Peters (1815–1883)
- D.S. Peters – Dieter Stefan Peters paleontology, including birds
- J.L. Peters – James Lee Peters (1889–1952) ornithology
- Petrunkevitch – Alexander Petrunkevitch (1875–1964)
- Pfeffer – Georg Johann Pfeffer (1854–1931)
- Philippi – Rodolfo Amando Philippi (1808–1904) paleontology, zoology
- Pic – Maurice Pic (1866–1957) entomology
- Pickard-Cambridge – Octavius Pickard-Cambridge (1828–1917)
- Pierce – Frank Nelson Pierce (1861–1943)
- Pietsch – Theodore Wells Pietsch III
- Pietschmann – Victor Pietschmann (1881–1956)
- Pilsbry – Henry Augustus Pilsbry (1862–1957)
- Pisera – Andrzej Pisera
- Platnick – Norman I. Platnick arachnology
- Pocock – Reginald Innes Pocock (1863–1947)
- Poda – Nikolaus Poda von Neuhaus (1723–1798) entomology
- Poey – Felipe Poey (1799–1891) entomology, ichthyology
- Poeppig – Eduard Friedrich Poeppig (1798–1868)
- Pol – Diego Pol
- Poli – Giuseppe Saverio Poli (1746–1825)
- Pollini – Ciro Pollini (ru) (1782—1833)
- Pomel – Auguste Pomel (1821–1898)
- Pompeckj – Josef Felix Pompeckj (1867–1930)
- Pontoppidan – Erik Pontoppidan (1698–1764)
- Pope – Clifford Hillhouse Pope (1899–1974) herpetology
- Potts – Thomas Potts (1824–1888)
- Pouyaud – Laurent Pouyaud
- Powell – Jaime Eduardo Powell
- Pruvot-Fol – Alice Pruvot-Fol (1873–1972)
- Przewalski – Nikolai Przhevalsky (1839–1888)
- Pucheran – Jacques Pucheran (1817–1894)
- Pulitzer-Finali – Gustavo Pulitzer-Finali
- Püngeler – Rudolf Püngeler (1857–1927)
- Purcell – William Frederick Purcell (1866–1919)
- Pusch, von Pusch – Botho von Pusch

== Q ==
- Quatrefages – Jean Louis Armand de Quatrefages de Bréau (1810–1892)
- Quoy – Jean René Constant Quoy (1790–1869)

== R ==
- Raath – Michael Andrew Raath
- Rachmatika – Ike Rachmatika
- Rackett – Thomas Rackett (1757–1841)
- Radcliffe – Lewis Radcliffe (1880–1950)
- Radde – Gustav Radde (1831–1903)
- Rafinesque – Constantine Samuel Rafinesque-Schmaltz (1783–1840)
- Raffles – Thomas Stamford Raffles (1781–1826)
- Rainbow – William Joseph Rainbow (1856–1919)
- Rajasuriya – Arjan Rajasuriya
- Rambur – Jules Pièrre Rambur (1801–1870)
- Ramos – Robson Tamar da Costa Ramos
- Ramsay, E.P. Ramsay – Edward Pierson Ramsay (1842–1916)
- Rand – Austin L. Rand (1905–1982)
- Randall – John E. Randall (born 1924)
- Rathbun – Mary J. Rathbun (1860–1943)
- Rathke – Martin Heinrich Rathke (1793–1860)
- Ratzeburg – Julius Theodor Christian Ratzeburg (1801–1871)
- Rauhut – Oliver Walter Mischa Rauhut
- Razoumowsky – Grigory Razumovsky (1759–1837)
- Reakirt – Tryon Reakirt (1844–after 1871)
- Reboleira – Ana Sofia Reboleira (born 1980)
- Rebel – Hans Rebel (1861–1940)
- Regan – C. Tate Regan (1878–1943)
- Regel – Eduard August von Regel (1815–1892)
- Régimbart – Maurice Auguste Régimbart (1852–1907)
- Reichenbach – Ludwig Reichenbach (1793–1879)
- Reichenow – Anton Reichenow (1847–1941)
- Reid – Amanda Reid malacology
- Reig – Osvaldo Alfredo Reig (1929–1992)
- Reinhardt – Johannes Theodor Reinhardt (1816–1882)
- Reinhart – Roy Herbert Reinhart (1919–2005)
- Renyaan – Samuel J. Renyaan
- Retzius – Anders Jahan Retzius (1742–1821)
- Riabinin – Anatoly Nikolaevich Riabinin
- Rich – Thomas Hewitt Rich
- P. Rich – see Vickers-Rich
- Richardson – John Richardson (1787–1865)
- Richmond – Charles Wallace Richmond (1868–1932)
- Richmond – Neil D. Richmond (1912–1992) mammalogy, herpetology
- Ridgway – Robert Ridgway (1850–1929)
- Riggs – Elmer Samuel Riggs (1869–1963)
- Riley – Joseph Harvey Riley (1873–1941)
- Ripley – Sidney Dillon Ripley (1913–2001)
- Ris – Friedrich Ris (1867–1931)
- Risso – Antoine Risso (1777–1845)
- Rivero – Juan A. Rivero (fl. mid-late 20th century)
- Roberts – Austin Roberts (1883–1948)
- Robertson – David Ross Robertson (born 1946)
- Robinson – Herbert Christopher Robinson (1874–1929)
- Robison – Henry W. Robison
- Robson – Guy Coburn Robson (1888–1945)
- Rodriguez – Gilberto Rodríguez (1929–2004)
- Röding – Peter Friedrich Röding (1767–1846)
- Roewer – Carl Friedrich Roewer (1881–1963)
- Rogenhofer – Alois Friedrich Rogenhofer (1831–1897)
- Roger – Julius Roger (1819–1865)
- Rogick – Mary Dora Rogick (1906–1964)
- Rohde – Klaus Rohde (born 1932)
- Rohwer – Sievert Allen Rohwer (1887–1951)
- Romer – Alfred Romer (1894–1973)
- Rondelet – Guillaume Rondelet (1507–1566)
- Roniewicz – Ewa Roniewicz
- Rossi – Pietro Rossi (1738–1804)
- Rossignol – Martial Rossignol
- Rossman – Douglas Athon Rossman (1936–2015)
- Rothschild – Walter Rothschild, 2nd Baron Rothschild (1868–1937)
- Roule – Louis Roule (1861–1942)
- Roxas – Hilario Atanacio Roxas (1896–1926)
- Rozhdestvensky – Anatole Rozhdestvensky
- Rudolphi – Karl Rudolphi (1771–1832)
- Rüppell – Eduard Rüppell (1794–1884)
- Russell – Dale Alan Russell (1937–2019)
- Ryder – John Adam Ryder (1852–1895)

== S ==
- Sakamoto – Katsuichi Sakamoto
- Salgado – Leonardo Salgado
- Salmoni – Dave Salmoni
- Salter – John William Salter (1820–1869)
- Salvadori – Tommaso Salvadori (1835–1923)
- Salvin – Osbert Salvin (1835–1898)
- Samouelle – George Samouelle (c. 1790–1846)
- Sampson – Scott D. Sampson
- Sanborn – Colin Campbell Sanborn (1897–1962)
- Santschi – Felix Santschi (1872–1940)
- Sarato – Ligur Sarato
- G. O. Sars – Georg Ossian Sars (1837–1927)
- M. Sars – Michael Sars (1809–1869)
- Satunin – Konstantin Alexeevitsch Satunin (1863–1915)
- E. Saunders – Edward Saunders (1848–1910) entomology (mainly Coleoptera, Hemiptera, Hymenoptera)
- H. Saunders, Saunders – Howard Saunders (1835–1907) ornithology
- Saunders, W. Saunders – William Wilson Saunders (1809–1879) entomology (mainly Hymenoptera and Lepidoptera)
- Saussure – Henri Louis Frédéric de Saussure (1829–1905)
- Savi – Paolo Savi (1798–1871)
- Savigny – Marie Jules César Savigny (1777–1851)
- Saville-Kent – William Saville-Kent (1845–1908)
- Savornin – Justin Savornin (1876–1970)
- Say – Thomas Say (1787–1843)
- Schaum – Hermann Rudolph Schaum (1819–1865)
- Schinz – Heinrich Rudolf Schinz (1771–1861)
- Schiapelli – Rita Delia Schiapelli
- Schiffermüller – Ignaz Schiffermüller (1727–1806)
- Schiödte – Jørgen Matthias Christian Schiødte (1815–1884)
- Schlaikjer – Erich Maren Schlaikjer (1905–1972)
- Schlegel – Hermann Schlegel (1804–1884)
- Schmidt – Karl Patterson Schmidt (1890–1957)
- Schnabl – Johann Andreas Schnabl (1838–1912)
- Schneider – Johann Gottlob Schneider (1750–1822)
- Schoepf(f) – Johann David Schoepff (1752–1800)
- Schönherr – Carl Johan Schönherr (1772–1848)
- Schomburgk – Robert Hermann Schomburgk (1804–1865)
- Schrank – Franz von Paula Schrank (1747–1835)
- Schreber – Johann Christian Daniel von Schreber (1739–1810)
- Schren(c)k – Leopold von Schrenck (1824–1896)
- Schultz – Leonard Peter Schultz (1901–1986)
- Schwartz – Ernst Schwartz
- P. L. Sclater – Philip Sclater (1829–1913)
- W. L. Sclater – William Lutley Sclater (1863–1944)
- Scopoli – Giovanni Antonio Scopoli (1723–1788)
- Scott – John Scott (1823–1888)
- Scudder – Samuel Hubbard Scudder (1837–1911)
- Seebohm – Henry Seebohm (1832–1895)
- Seegers – Lothar Seegers
- Seeley – Harry Govier Seeley (1839–1909)
- Selby – Prideaux John Selby (1788–1867)
- Sélys – Edmond de Sélys Longchamps (1813–1900)
- Semenov-Tian-Shanskii – Andrei Semenov-Tian-Shanskii (1866–1942)
- Sennett – George B. Sennett (1840–1900)
- Sereno – Paul Sereno (born 1957)
- Serville – Jean Guillaume Audinet-Serville (1775–1858)
- Sevastianov – Aleksandr Fiodorovich Sevastianov
- Severtzov – Nikolai Alekseevich Severtzov (1827–1885)
- Sharpe – Richard Bowdler Sharpe (1847–1909)
- Shaw – George Shaw (1751–1813)
- Shelley – George Ernest Shelley (1840–1910)
- Shuckard – William Edward Shuckard (1803–1868)
- Sichel – Frédéric Jules Sichel (1802–1868)
- Sick – Helmut Sick (1910–1991)
- Sideleva – Valentina Grigorievna Sideleva
- Siebold – Karl Theodor Ernst von Siebold (1804–1885)
- Silvestri – Filippo Silvestri (1873–1949)
- Simon – Eugène Simon (1848–1924)
- Simpson – George Gaylord Simpson (1902–1984)
- Slipinski – Stanisław Adam Ślipiński
- Slosson – Annie Trumbull Slosson (1838–1926) entomology
- Smith – Andrew Smith (1797–1872) zoology of southern Africa
- Hamilton Smith – Charles Hamilton Smith (1776–1859)
- E. Smith – Edgar Albert Smith (1847–1916) malacology
- F. Smith – Frederick Smith (1805–1879) entomology
- H.M. Smith – Hobart Muir Smith (1912–2013) herpetology
- J.E. Smith – James Edward Smith (1759–1828) Lepidoptera
- J.L.B. Smith – James Leonard Brierley Smith (1897–1968) ichthyology
- M.A. Smith – Malcolm Arthur Smith (1875–1958) herpetology
- S.I. Smith – Sidney Irving Smith (1843–1926) Crustacea
- W.L. Smith – William Leo Smith
- Snellen von Vollenhoven – Samuel Constantinus Snellen von Vollenhoven (1816–1880)
- Snethlage – Emilia Snethlage (1868–1929)
- Snodgrass – Robert Evans Snodgrass (1875–1962)
- Soeroto – Bambang Soeroto
- Sollas – William Johnson Sollas (1849–1936)
- Sowerby, Sby. – George Brettingham Sowerby I (1788–1854)
- Spallanzani – Lazzaro Spallanzani (1729–1799)
- Sparrman – Anders Sparrman (1781–1826)
- Spencer – Alison Louise (born 1993)
- Spencer – Walter Baldwin Spencer (1860–1929)
- Spinola – Maximilian Spinola (1780–1857)
- Spix – Johann Baptist von Spix (1781–1826)
- Stahnke – Herbert Ludwig Stahnke (1902–1990)
- Stainton – Henry Tibbats Stainton (1822–1892)
- Starks – Edwin Chapin Starks (1867–1932)
- Statius Müller/Muller – see P.L.S. Müller
- Staudinger – Otto Staudinger (1830–1900)
- Stebbing – Thomas Stebbing (1835–1926)
- Steenstrup – Japetus Steenstrup (1813–1897)
- Steere – Joseph Beal Steere (1842–1940)
- Stein – Johann Philip Emil Friedrich Stein (1816–1882)
- Steindachner – Franz Steindachner (1834–1919)
- Stejneger – Leonhard Hess Stejneger (1851–1943)
- Stephens – James Francis Stephens (1792–1852)
- Sternberg – Charles Hazelius Sternberg (1850–1943)
- Sternberg – Charles Mortram Sternberg (1885–1981)
- D. J. Stewart – Donald J. Stewart
- Stimpson – William Stimpson (1832–1872) naturalist, American
- Stirling – Edward Charles Stirling (1848–1919) anthropologist, Australian
- Stolzmann – Jean Stanislaus Stolzmann (1854–1928)
- Stoll – Caspar Stoll (died 1791)
- Storr – Gottlieb Conrad Christian Storr (1749–1821)
- Stovall – John Willis Stovall (1891–1953)
- Strand – Embrik Strand (1876–1953)
- Strauch – Alexander Strauch (1832–1893)
- Streets – Thomas Hale Streets (1847–1925)
- Stresemann – Erwin Stresemann (1889–1972)
- Strickland – Hugh Edwin Strickland (1811–1853)
- Stritt – Walter Stritt (1892–1975)
- Ström – Hans Ström (1726–1797)
- Stromer – Ernst Stromer (1870–1952)
- Struhsaker – Paul J. Struhsaker
- Su – Su Song (1020–1101)
- Such – George Such (1798–1879)
- Suckley – George Suckley (1830–1869)
- Sues – Hans-Dieter Sues (born 1956)
- Sullivan – Robert M. Sullivan
- Sulzer – Johann Heinrich Sulzer (1735–1813)
- Sundevall – Carl Jakob Sundevall (1801–1875)
- Svabenik – Jan Švábeník (1886–1942)
- Swainson – William Swainson (1789–1855)
- Swann – Henry Kirke Swann (1871–1926)
- Swinhoe – Robert Swinhoe (1836–1877)
- Sykes – William Henry Sykes (1790–1872)

== T ==
- Tabachnick – Konstantin R. Tabachnick
- Taczanowski – Władysław Taczanowski (1819–1890)
- Talbot – Mignon Talbot (1869–1950)
- Taliev – Dmitrii Nikolaevich Taliev (1908–1952)
- Tang – Zhilu Tang
- Taquet – Philippe Taquet (born 1940)
- Taschenberg – Ernst Ludwig Taschenberg (1818–1898)
- Tate – George Henry Hamilton Tate (1894–1953)
- Tate – Ralph Tate (1840–1901)
- Tattersall, W.M. Tattersall – Walter Medley Tattersall (1882–1948)
- Taylor – Edward Harrison Taylor (1889–1978) herpetology, ichthyology
- L.R. Taylor – Leighton R. Taylor
- Temminck – Coenraad Jacob Temminck (1778–1858)
- Templeton – Robert Templeton (1802–1892)
- Thayer – John Eliot Thayer (1862–1933)
- Théel – Johan Hjalmar Théel (1848–1937)
- Theischinger – Günther Theischinger (born 1940)
- Theobald, W. Theob. – William Theobald (1829–1908)
- Thiele – Johannes Thiele (1860–1935)
- Thomas – Oldfield Thomas (1858–1929)
- Thomson, J. Thomson – James Thomson (1828–1897) entomology, primarily Coleoptera and Hymenoptera
- C.G. Thomson, Thomson – Carl Gustaf Thomson (1824–1899) entomology, primarily Swedish insects
- Thorell – Tord Tamerlan Teodor Thorell (1830–1901)
- Thunberg – Carl Peter Thunberg (1743–1828)
- Tillyard – Robert John Tillyard (1881–1937)
- Timm – Tarmo Timm (born 1936)
- Tinbergen – Nikolaas Tinbergen (1907–1988)
- Tjakrawidjaja – Agus Tjakrawidjaja
- Ticehurst – Claud Buchanan Ticehurst (1881–1941)
- Tidwell – Virginia Tidwell
- Tilesius – Wilhelm Gottlieb Tilesius von Tilenau (1769–1857)
- Timberlake – Philip H. Timberlake (1883–1981)
- Tischbein – Peter Friedrich Ludwig Tischbein (1813–1883)
- Todd – Walter Edmond Clyde Todd (1874–1969)
- Tokioka – Takasi Tokioka (1913–2001)
- Toledo-Piza – Mônica de Toledo-Piza Ragazzo
- Tomes – Robert Fisher Tomes (1823–1904)
- Townsend – John Kirk Townsend (1809–1851) ornithology, mainly landbirds
- C. H. Townsend – Charles Haskins Townsend (1859–1944) marine biology
- Toxopeus – Lambertus Johannes Toxopeus (1894–1951) entomology
- Traill – Thomas Stewart Traill (1781–1862)
- Traylor – Melvin Alvah Traylor Jr. (1915–2008)
- Trewavas – Ethelwynn Trewavas (1900–1993)
- Tristram – Henry Baker Tristram (1822–1906)
- Troschel – Franz Hermann Troschel (1810–1882)
- Trouessart – Édouard Louis Trouessart (1842–1927)
- True – Frederick W. True (1858–1914)
- Trybom – Filip Trybom (1850–1913)
- Tryon – George Washington Tryon (1838–1888) malacology
- Tschudi – Johann Jakob von Tschudi (1818–1889)
- Tsogtbaatar – Khishigjaw Tsogtbaatar
- Tumanova – Tat'yana Alekseyevna Tumanova
- Tunstall – Marmaduke Tunstall (1743–1790)
- Turner – Alfred Jefferis Turner (1861–1947)
- Turton – William Turton (1762–1835)
- Tutt – J. W. Tutt (1858–1911)
- Tytler – Robert Christopher Tytler (1818–1872)

== U ==
- Uhler – Philip Reese Uhler (1835–1913)

== V ==
- Vaillant – Léon Vaillant (1834–1914)
- Valenciennes – Achille Valenciennes (1794–1865)
- Van Denburgh – John Van Denburgh (1872–1924)
- Van Duzee, E.P. Van Duzee – Edward Payson Van Duzee (1861–1940)
- Van Duzee, M.C. Van Duzee – Millard Carr Van Duzee (1860–1934)
- Vander Linden – Pierre Léonard Vander Linden (1797–1831)
- Varricchio – David J. Varricchio
- E. Verreaux – Edouard Verreaux (1810–1868)
- J. Verreaux – Jules Verreaux (1807–1873)
- Verrill – Addison Emery Verrill (1839–1926)
- Vickaryous – Matthew P. Vickaryous
- Vickers-Rich, P. Rich – Patricia Vickers-Rich (born 1944)
- Vieillot – Louis Pierre Vieillot (1748–1830)
- Vieweg – C. F. Vieweg
- Vigors – Nicholas Aylward Vigors (1785–1840)
- Villers – Charles Joseph de Villers (1724–1810)
- Vladykov – Vadim Dmitrij Vladykov (1898–1986)
- von Blomberg – Ernst Freiherr von Blomberg (1821–1903)

== W ==
- Wagler – Johann Georg Wagler (1800–1832)
- Wagner – Johann Andreas Wagner (1797–1861)
- Wahlberg – Johan August Wahlberg (1810–1859)
- Walbaum – Johann Julius Walbaum (1724–1799)
- Walch – Johann Ernst Immanuel Walch (1725–1778)
- Walckenaer – Charles Athanase Walckenaer (1771–1852)
- Walker – Edmund Murton Walker (1877–1969) entomology
- A. Walker – Alick Donald Walker (1925–1999) paleontology
- C.A. Walker – Cyril Alexander Walker paleontology
- F. Walker – Francis Walker (1809–1874) entomology
- Wall – Frank Wall (1868–1950)
- Wallace – Alfred Russel Wallace (1823–1913)
- Wallengren – Hans Daniel Johan Wallengren (1823–1894)
- Walsh – Benjamin Dann Walsh (1808–1869)
- Walsingham – Thomas de Grey, 6th Baron Walsingham (1843–1919)
- Waltl – Joseph Waltl (1805–1888)
- X.L. Wang, X.-L. Wang, X. Wang – Xiaolin Wang (zoologist)
- Y.Q. Wang, Y.-Q. Wang, Y. Wang – Yuanqing Wang
- R.G. Wardlaw-Ramsay – Robert George Wardlaw Ramsay (1852–1921)
- Watabe – Mahito Watabe
- Waterhouse – George Robert Waterhouse (1801–1888)
- Weber – Max Carl Wilhelm Weber (1852–1937) general zoology, mainly vertebrates
- H. Weber, Weber – Hermann Weber (1899–1956)
- Wegrzynowicz – Piotr Węgrzynowicz
- Weigold – Hugo Weigold (1886–1973)
- Weishampel – David B. Weishampel (born 1952)
- Welles – Samuel Paul Welles (1907–1997)
- West – Rick C. West arachnology
- Westwood – John O. Westwood (1805–1893)
- Wetmore – Alexander Wetmore (1886–1978)
- Weyenbergh – Hendrik Weyenbergh, Jr. (1842–1885)
- Wheeler – William Morton Wheeler (1865–1937)
- Whitaker – Joseph Whitaker ornithology
- White – Adam White (1817–1878)
- Whitley – Gilbert Percy Whitley (1903–1975)
- Wiedemann – Christian Rudolph Wilhelm Wiedemann (1770–1840)
- Wied-Neuwied – Maximilian zu Wied-Neuwied (1782–1867)
- Wiegmann – Arend Friedrich August Wiegmann (1802–1841)
- Williams – James David Williams (1941–2021)
- Williamson – Thomas Edward Williamson
- Wilsmore – Leonora Jessie Wilsmore (1865–1945)
- Wilson – Alexander Wilson (1766–1813) ornithology
- E.O. Wilson – Edward Osborne Wilson (1929–2021)
- J.A. Wilson – Jeffrey A. Wilson paleontology
- Wiman – Carl Wiman (1867–1944)
- Wingate – David B. Wingate (born 1935)
- Winge – Herluf Winge (1857–1923)
- Wirjoatmodjo – Soetikno Wirjoatmodjo
- Wolfe – Douglas Gerald Wolfe
- Wood, W. Wood – William Wood (1774–1857) entomology
- C.T. Wood, Wood – Charles Thorold Wood (1777–1852) ornithology
- Wood-Mason – James Wood-Mason (1846–1893)
- Woodhouse – Samuel Washington Woodhouse (1821–1904)
- Woodward – Arthur Smith Woodward (1864–1944)
- Wroughton – R. C. Wroughton (1849–1921)

== X ==
- Xantus – John Xantus de Vesey (1825–1894)
- Xu – Xing Xu

== Y ==
- Yamaguchi, Yamaguti – Masao Yamaguchi
- Yamaguti Satyu Yamaguti (1894–1976) parasitology
- Yamanoue – Yusuke Yamanoue
- Yang, Young – Zhongjian Yang (1897–1979)
- Yarrell – William Yarrell (1784–1856)
- Yoseda – Kenzo Yoseda
- You – Heilu Go Pak You
- Young – David Allan Young (1915–1991) Hemiptera, especially Cicadellidae

== Z ==
- Zaddach – Ernst Gustav Zaddach (1817–1881)
- Zagulajev, Zagulayev – Aleksei Konstantinovich Zagulajev (1924–2007)
- Zanno – Lindsay E. Zanno
- Zeledon – José Castulo Zeledón (1846–1923)
- Zeller – Philipp Christoph Zeller (1808–1883)
- Zetterstedt – Johan Wilhelm Zetterstedt (1785–1874)
- B./B.K./B.-K. Zhang – Bao-kun Zhang
- F./F.C./F.-C. Zhang – Fucheng Zhang
- Zhao – Ermi Zhao (1930-2016) herpetologist
- Zhao – Xijin Zhao (1935-2012) paleontologist
- S. Zhou – Shiwu Zhou (born 1940)
- Z./Z.H.Z.-H. Zhou – Zhonghe Zhou (born 1965)
- Zimmer – John Todd Zimmer (1889–1957)
- Zimmermann – Eberhard August Wilhelm von Zimmermann (1743–1815)
- Zincken – Johann Leopold Theodor Friedrich Zincken (1770–1856)
- Zirngiebl – Lothar Zirngiebl (1902–1973)
- Zittel – Karl Alfred von Zittel (1839–1904)
- Zur Strassen – Otto zur Strassen (1869–1961)

== See also ==
- List of botanists by author abbreviation
- List of biologists
- List of Russian zoologists
