= Kdousov =

- Municipality
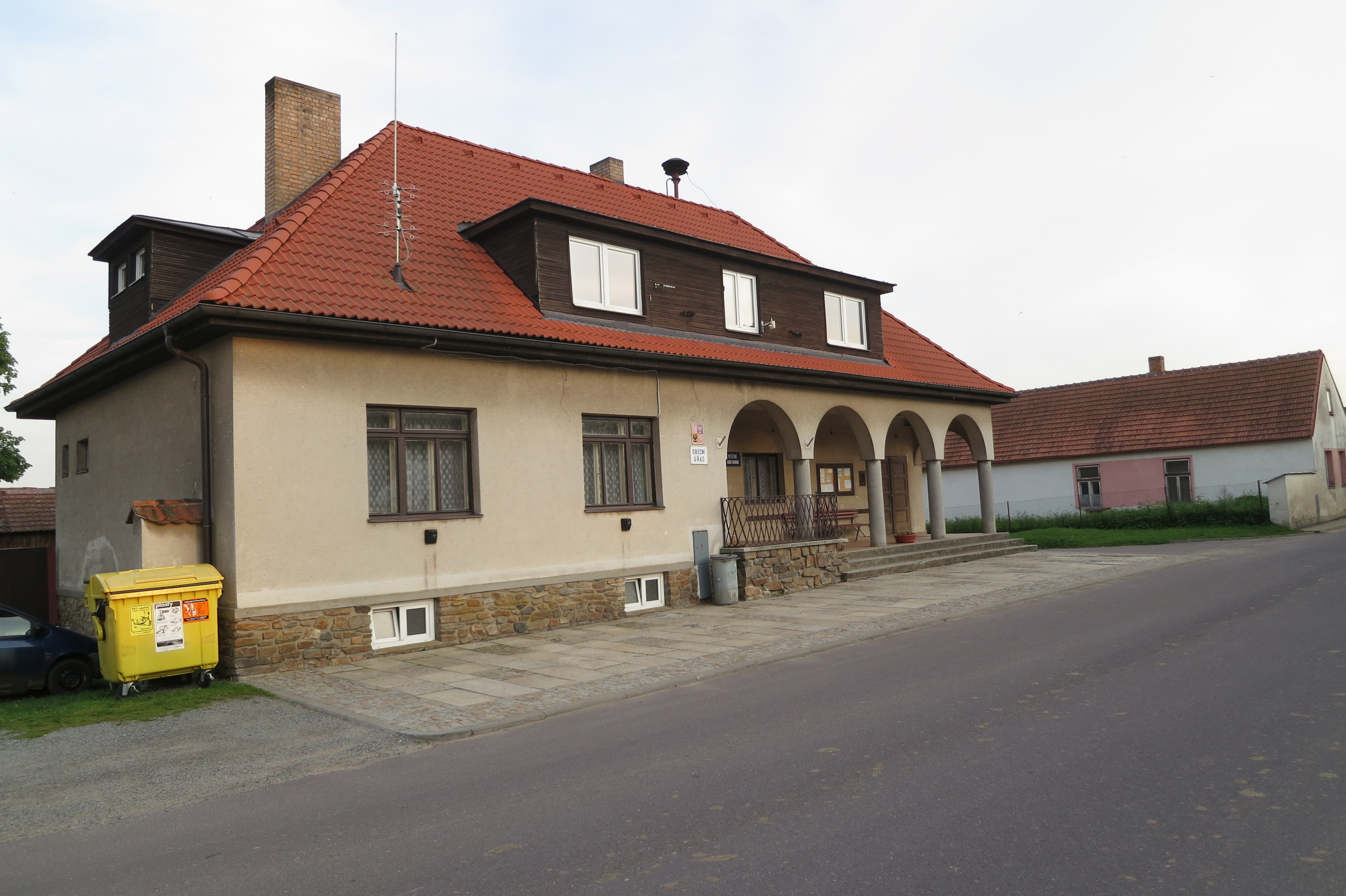
- Municipal office

- Location in the Czech Republic
- Coordinates: 48°59′10″N 15°38′50″E
- Country: Czech Republic
- Region: Vysočina
- District: Třebíč
- First mentioned: 1342

Area
  - Total: 2.25 km^{2} (0.87 sq mi)
- Elevation: 458 m (1,503 ft)

Population (2026-01-01)
  - Total: 117
  - Density: 52.0/km^{2} (135/sq mi)
- Time zone: UTC+1 (CET)
  - Summer (DST): UTC+2 (CEST)
- Postal code: 675 32
- Website: www.kdousov.cz

Kdousov is a municipality and village in Třebíč District in the Vysočina Region of the Czech Republic. It has about 100 inhabitants.

Kdousov lies approximately 32 kilometres (20 mi) south-west of Třebíč, 46 km (29 mi) south of Jihlava, and 152 km (94 mi) south-east of Prague.

== Demographics ==
Historical population
Year	Pop.	±%
1869	237	—
1880	222	−6.3%
1890	265	+19.4%
1900	259	−2.3%
1910	226	−12.7%
1921	251	+11.1%
1930	272	+8.4%
1950	219	−19.5%
1961	224	+2.3%
1970	184	−17.9%
1980	144	−21.7%
1991	128	−11.1%
2001	108	−15.6%
2011	116	+7.4%
2021	120	+3.4%
Source: Censuses

== Notable people ==
- Jan Švábeník (1886–1942), zoologist
