= Reginald C. Beavan =

British naturalist and army officer

Reginald Beavan
- Born: Reginald C. Beavan; 20 September 1843; Landour, Uttarakhand, India
- Died: 12 May 1927; Radnorshire, Wales
- Known for: Handbook of the Freshwater Fishes of India (1877)
- Scientific career
- Fields: Natural history, Ichthyology
- Institutions: British Indian Army

Reginald C. Beavan (20 September 1843 — 12 May 1927) was an Indian-born British naturalist who served in the British Indian Army.

== Biography ==
Reginald Beavan was the second eldest son of Robert Beavan (1809–1853) and his wife Cecilia Mabel Drury (1821–1896). Both sons of the couple were born in India, where their father was stationed. However, during the 1851 census Reginald and his mother were recorded in England, living with her family in Sidmouth. When Reginald was ten years old, his father died in India in October 1853.

At the age of sixteen, Beavan joined the British Indian Army on 4 May 1860, following his older brother to India, where he first served as a Lieutenant in the 22nd Punjab Native Infantry Regiment.

From July 1868, he worked as an assistant surveyor in several regions for the Department of Topographical Studies. By 1878 he was serving in southern Afghanistan, for which he received a medal. In 1880 he took responsibility for a study in Balochistan and accompanied the Marri Field Force and Bozdar Field Force in 1880 and 1881. He retired from active service in June 1892.

On 20 November 1873, Beavan married Anne Henrietta Haughton Bignell (1846–1932) at Kamptee, Maharashtra. The couple had two daughters, born in 1874 and 1877, though the younger died in infancy.

Beavan’s scientific work focused primarily on fish. His best-known publication is the Handbook of the Freshwater Fishes of India, published in London in 1877. He also collected a number of bird species and eggs, many of which were later described scientifically by his ornithologist brother Robert Cecil Beavan (1841–1870).

Beavan retired with the military rank of Colonel and spent his later years in Llowes, Brecknockshire, Wales. He died in May 1927 at the age of 83, leaving an estate of over £11,000 to his unmarried daughter, Cecilia Mabel Beavan (1874–1944).

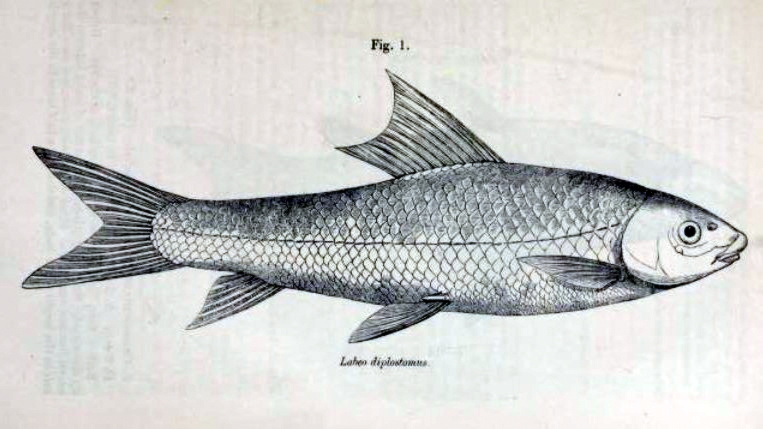
Bangana diplostoma (Heckel, 1838), illustrated by Reginald Beavan

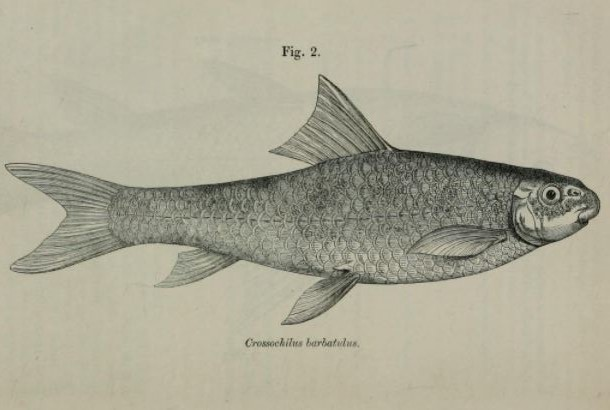
Crossocheilus diplochilus (Heckel, 1838), illustrated by Reginald Beavan

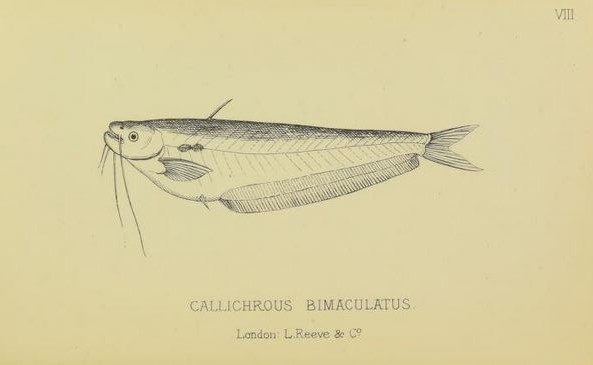
Ompok bimaculatus (Bloch, 1794), illustrated by Reginald Beavan

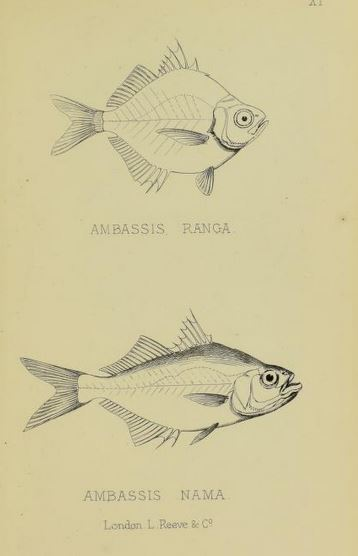
Parambassis ranga (Hamilton, 1822) and Chanda nama (Hamilton, 1822), illustrated by Reginald Beavan

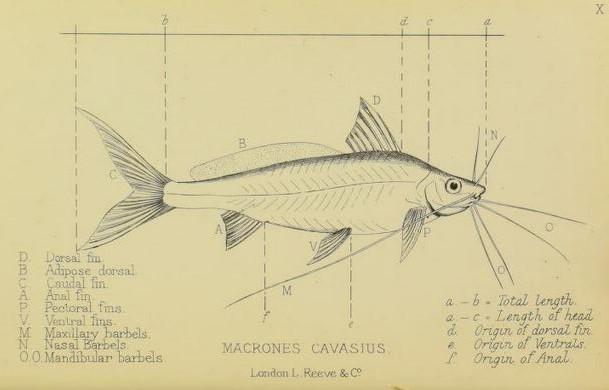
Mystus cavasius (Hamilton, 1822), illustrated by Reginald Beavan

== Selected publications ==
- Beavan, Reginald (1872). "Descriptions of two imperfectly known species of Cyprinoid fishes from Punjab, India". Proceedings of the Scientific Meetings of the Zoological Society of London: 150–153.
- Beavan, Reginald (1877). Handbook of the Freshwater Fishes of India: Giving the Characteristic Peculiarities of All the Species at Present Known, and Intended as a Guide to Students and District Officers. London: L. Reeve & Co.
- Beavan, Reginald (1880). "Notes on the Country between Candahar and Girishk". Proceedings of the Royal Geographical Society and Monthly Record of Geography. 2 (9): 548–552. doi:10.2307/1800418. JSTOR 1800418.
