= Maximilian Fischer =

Austrian entomologist (1929–2019)

Maximilian Fischer (1929-2019) was an Austrian entomologist and a specialist on parasitic wasps (Braconidae: Opiinae, Alysiinae). He curated the Hymenoptera collections of the Natural History Museum Vienna from 1955 to 1994. He described more than 1000 new species of Braconidae flies in more than 300 publications.

He was born on 7 June 1929 and died on 15 June 2019.
