= Mamoru Oguma =

Japanese entomologist (1886–1971)

- 小熊 捍
- Born: 24 August 1885; Akasaka, Tokyo, Japan
- Died: 10 September 1971 (aged 86)
- Education: Sapporo Agricultural College; Tohoku Imperial University
- Alma mater: Tohoku Imperial University
- Known for: Research on dragonflies and human chromosomes
- Awards: Order of the Purple Ribbon (1963)
- Scientific career
- Fields: Entomology, Cytology, Genetics
- Institutions: Hokkaido Imperial University; National Institute of Genetics
- Doctoral students: Yoshimaro Yamashina

Mamoru Oguma (Japanese: 小熊 捍; August 24, 1885 – September 10, 1971) was a Japanese entomologist and geneticist. He held the degree of Doctor of Agriculture and is best known for his pioneering work in insect morphology and human genetics.

== Biography ==
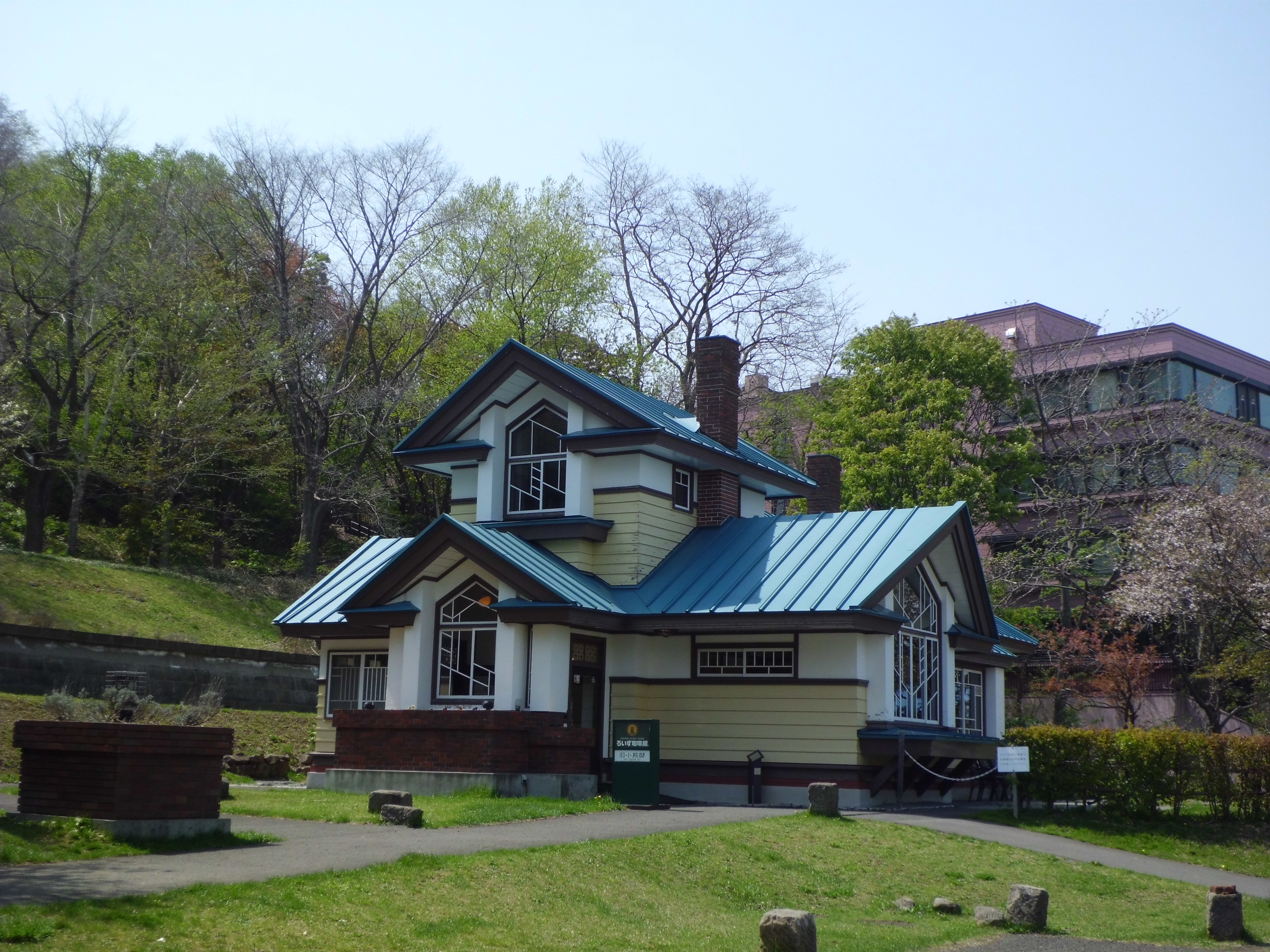
Former residence of Mamoru Oguma (pictured in 2015)

Oguma was born in Akasaka, Tokyo Prefecture (now Minato, Tokyo). As a student, he was influenced by entomologist Matsumura Shōnen. In 1903, he graduated from Tokyo First Middle School (now Hibiya High School) and entered the Sapporo Agricultural College.

In 1911, he graduated from the Department of Agriculture at Tohoku Imperial University, and began working in the Agricultural Biology Department. From 1922 to 1924, he studied abroad in the United Kingdom, Germany, and Belgium.

In 1929, following the retirement of Professor Saburō Hatta, he became professor of zoology and entomology at the Faculty of Agriculture, Hokkaido Imperial University. The following year, in 1930, he transferred to the newly established Faculty of Science, where he became professor in the Department of Zoology. His previous post was filled by Tetsuo Inukai. He became well known as a leading authority on the study of dragonflies.

Oguma served in various senior roles including:

- Dean of the Faculty of Science, Hokkaido Imperial University
- Director of the Institute of Low Temperature Science
- Director of the Akkeshi Marine Laboratory
- Director of the Catalysis Research Center (now the Institute for Catalysis, Hokkaido University)
- First Director of the National Institute of Genetics (Japan)
- President of the Sapporo New Symphony Orchestra Supporters Association

He retired in 1955 and was awarded the Order of the Purple Ribbon in 1963.

== Research ==
Oguma made significant contributions in entomology, cytology, and genetics. His 1919 paper on "The Histological Study of the Compound Eyes of Dragonflies" and his 1922 study (with Hitoshi Kihara, a future professor at Kyoto University) on human chromosomes were especially well regarded for their originality.

In a controversial study, Oguma obtained testicular samples from anti-Japanese guerrillas captured in northeast China with assistance from the Imperial Japanese Army. He used these samples to study chromosomes and published his findings in a U.S. scientific journal in June 1937.

== Legacy ==
Oguma's former residence, located in Chūō-ku, Sapporo, was designed in 1929 by Yoshiya Tanoue, a disciple of Frank Lloyd Wright, and was selected as one of the 100 Cultural Landmarks of Sapporo. The house was relocated in 1998 to Fushimi, Sapporo at the base of Mount Moiwa and has since been used as a local landmark, formerly as Lloyd's Coffee Museum until 2017, and currently as the fly-fishing shop "Dolly Varden".

Oguma was also known as the academic advisor to Yoshimaro Yamashina. He had personal friendships with writer Takeo Arishima and legal scholar Miyoji Hayakawa.

== Selected works ==
- Experimental Methods in Animal Cytology (動物細胞學實驗法), in Biological Laboratory Methods Series Kenbunkan, 1937–1938
- The March of Insects (虫の進軍), North Publishing, October 1946
- The Urgent Need to Establish a National Institute of Genetics: Fundamental Policy for Solving Issues of Human Resources, Food Production, and National Strength (1939, self-published)
- Three Years for Peaches and Chestnuts (桃栗三年), Uchida Rokakuho, 1957; Winner of the Japan Essayist Club Prize
- The Sparrow's Cafeteria (雀の食堂), Kodansha, 1966

== Awards ==
- 1963: Order of the Purple Ribbon
