= Edgardo Mondolfi =

Venezuelan mammalogist (1918–1999)

Edgardo Mondolfi Otero
- Born: 15 May 1918; Caracas, Venezuela
- Died: 7 November 1999 (aged 81)
- Known for: Mammalogy; conservation and wildlife management in South America
- Scientific career
- Fields: Biology, Ecology
- Institutions: Central University of Venezuela

Edgardo Mondolfi Otero (15 May 1918 - 7 November 1999) was a Venezuelan biologist and ecologist specializing in mammalogy.

== Career ==
Mondolfi was a professor of zoology at the Central University of Venezuela, adviser to the Ministry of Environment, and Deputy Minister of Agriculture.

He authored numerous books and scientific articles, including a monograph on the jaguar together with Rafael Hoogesteijn. He carried out pioneering work in wildlife management and was well known for his campaigns for the exploration and protection of South American mammal fauna.

In his later years, he served as Ambassador of Venezuela to Tanzania and Kenya. He died on 7 November 1999 of dengue fever.

=== Honors ===
In 2006, zoologists Daniel Lew, Roger Pérez-Hernández, and Jacint Ventura named the four-eyed opossum Philander mondolfii in his honor.

For his environmental work, he received the National Conservation Award of Venezuela in 1969.

== Species and subspecies described ==
Mondolfi was the first describer of several mammal species and subspecies, the following of which are considered valid:

- Sylvilagus brasiliensis caracasensis Mondolfi & Méndez Aroche, 1957
- Ichthyomys pittieri Handley & Mondolfi, 1963
- Dasypus sabanicola Mondolfi, 1968
- Didelphis imperfecta Mondolfi & Pérez-Hernández, 1984
- Sciurus granatensis llanensis Mondolfi & Boher, 1984

== Abbreviation ==
The abbreviation Mondolfi is used to indicate this author as the authority for zoological description and nomenclature.
