= Ismar de Souza Carvalho =

Brazilian paleontologist (born 1962)

- Born: April 4, 1962 (age 64); Resende, Rio de Janeiro, Brazil
- Education: University of Coimbra; Federal University of Rio de Janeiro; Federal Rural University of Rio de Janeiro
- Known for: Discovery of the oldest fossil bird in Brazil
- Scientific career
- Fields: Paleontology, Geology
- Workplaces: Federal University of Rio de Janeiro
- Thesis: Os conchostráceos fósseis das bacias interiores do Nordeste do Brasil (1993)
- Doctoral advisor: Maria Antonieta da Conceição Rodrigues

Ismar de Souza Carvalho (born 4 April 1962) is a Brazilian geologist, paleontologist, researcher, and university professor. He is the author of several reference books in the field and a full professor at the Federal University of Rio de Janeiro (UFRJ).

== Biography ==
Carvalho was born in Resende in 1962. From 1980 to 1984, he studied geology at the University of Coimbra. Returning to Brazil, he completed both a master's degree and a doctorate at the Federal University of Rio de Janeiro (UFRJ). His doctoral thesis, Os conchostráceos fósseis das bacias interiores do Nordeste do Brasil ("The fossil conchostracans of the interior basins of Northeast Brazil"), was defended in 1993 under the supervision of Maria Antonieta da Conceição Rodrigues. Between 1998 and 1999, he carried out postdoctoral research at the São Paulo State University (UNESP).

He is a professor at the Institute of Geosciences of the Federal University of Rio de Janeiro, a science communicator, and the author of several widely used reference works in paleontology.

Carvalho is credited with the discovery of the oldest fossil bird in Brazil, found in the Araripe Basin in Ceará. The fossil, dating to about 115 million years ago, represents a small bird the size of a hummingbird and is considered the most complete record of this type of animal from ancient Gondwana.

He also coordinates the "Casa de Pedra", a facility of the UFRJ supported by the Brazilian Association of Petroleum Geologists. The site provides accommodation, meals, and laboratories for students and researchers conducting fieldwork and fossil collection in the Araripe Basin, on the border between Pernambuco and Ceará.

== Books ==
- Paleontologia, 2004
- Paleontologia: Cenários da vida, 2007
- Paleontologia - Volume 1: Conceitos e Métodos, 2011, Interciência
- Paleontologia - Volume 2: Microfósseis e paleoinvertebrados, 2011, Interciência
- Paleontologia - Volume 3: Paleovertebrados e Paleobotânica, 2011, Interciência
