= Dieter Stefan Peters =

German paleontologist and ornithologist

- Born: June 5, 1932 (age 94); Gleiwitz, Upper Silesia
- Education: Goethe University Frankfurt
- Known for: Paleornithology, studies of Archaeopteryx and Messel birds
- Scientific career
- Fields: Ornithology, Paleornithology, Entomology
- Workplaces: Senckenberg Research Institute

Dieter Stefan Peters, often cited as D. S. Peters or D. Stefan Peters (born 5 June 1932 in Gleiwitz, Upper Silesia), is a German expert in paleornithology and ornithology.

== Biography ==
Peters moved to West Germany from Silesia in 1958. He earned his PhD in zoology at Goethe University Frankfurt in 1961 and started working at the Senckenberg Research Institute in 1964. He became curator of ornithology in 1976, deputy director in 1987, and retired in 1997. He also served as an adjunct professor of zoology at Frankfurt University from 1989, having completed his habilitation there in 1979. His successor as curator at the Senckenberg Museum is Gerald Mayr.

In 1996, he was the first to describe the bird species Kurzzehen-Kleibervanga. His research focuses on the early evolution of birds (including Archaeopteryx and Confuciusornis) as well as the avian fauna of the Messel Pit from the Eocene, such as the owls and birds of prey found there. He has also written popular science books on birds and insects for young readers (published by Otto Maier and Delphin Verlag) and works on societal and philosophical aspects of evolutionary theory. In Grzimek's Animal Life, he authored the chapter on swallows, and in the Brockhaus Encyclopedia, he contributed articles on ornithology. Peters has also published research in entomology.

His wife, Margarete, served as a physician leading the Frankfurt public health office.

== Selected publications ==
- Editor: Acta palaeornithologica. – Courier Forschungsinstitut Senckenberg 181, 1995 (3rd Symposium Society of Avian Paleontology and Evolution (SAPE) 1992)
- Die Messel-Vögel – eine Landvogelfauna, in: S. Schaal, W. Ziegler (eds.) Ein Schaufenster in die Geschichte der Erde und des Lebens, Frankfurt am Main: Waldemar Kramer, 1988, pp. 135–151
