= Runar Forsius =

Finnish entomologist (1884–1935)

- Born: 10 October 1884; Hamina, Grand Duchy of Finland
- Died: 31 October 1935 (aged 51); Helsinki, Finland
- Education: University of Helsinki
- Known for: Studies on sawflies (Tenthredinoidea)
- Spouse: Saima Alexandra Granit (m. 1918)
- Children: Henrik Forsius
- Scientific career
- Fields: Medicine, Entomology
- Workplaces: Töölö district health service, City of Helsinki

Runar Forsius (10 October 1884 – 31 October 1935) was a Finnish physician and entomologist.

Forsius was the son of school counsellor Walter Woldemar Forsius and Emilia (Mili) Sofia Lilius. He graduated from the Nya svenska samskolan in Helsinki in 1902 and received his Licentiate of Medicine degree in 1914. He worked as an assistant physician at the infectious diseases hospital from 1914 to 1927, as a district physician in Käpylä in 1927, and from that year onward as district physician in Töölö until his death. Forsius also served as a school physician in Swedish-language schools in Helsinki.

He was a military physician between 1918 and 1923 and served as a physician for the White Guard from 1923 to 1927, when he was commander of the medical company in the Helsinki White Guard. Forsius also worked as the physician for the Helsinki Volunteer Fire Brigade.

Forsius was an active entomologist and one of the founders of the Helsinki Entomological Society, where he also served for many years as chairman. He was particularly known for his research on sawflies (Tenthredinoidea). He published numerous studies in entomology and participated in entomological congresses in Copenhagen and Oslo. Forsius was a member of several Finnish and international scientific societies.

Forsius married Saima Alexandra Granit in 1918. Their son was the ophthalmologist, geneticist, and professor Henrik Forsius.

== Publications ==
- Verzeichnis der bisher aus dem Lojo-Gebiete bekannt gewordenen Tenthredinoiden: nebst einer Übersicht sämmtlicher in Finland festgestellter Arten. Acta Societatis pro fauna et flora Fennica, 46, 4. Societas pro fauna et flora Fennica, Helsingfors 1919.
- Hymenoptera: Tenthredinoiden und Oryssoiden. Über einige brasilianische Tenthredinoiden des Naturhistorischen Museums zu Stockholm. Arkiv för zoologi, A, 17, 27. Almqvist & Wiksell, Stockholm 1925.
- Über einige ostasiatische Macrophya-Arten. Acta Societatis pro fauna et flora Fennica, 56, 4. Societas pro fauna et flora Fennica, Helsingfors 1925.
- Tenthredinoidea. Arkiv för zoologi, A, 19, 11. Dr E. Mjöberg’s zoological collections from Sumatra, 5. Almqvist & Wiksell, Stockholm 1927.
- Tenthredinoiden aus China eingesammelt von Herrn Dir. Kj. Kolthoff 1921. Arkiv för zoologi, A, 19, 10. Almqvist & Wiksell, Stockholm 1927.
- Tenthredinoidea. Arkiv för zoologi, B, 20, 5. Entomologische Ergebnisse der schwedischen Kamtchatka-Expedition 1920–1922, 19. Almqvist & Wiksell, Stockholm 1929.
- Inventa entomologica itineris Hispanici et Maroccani, quod a. 1926 fecerunt Harald et Håkan Lindberg. 3, Über die von Mag.phil. Håkan Lindberg in Marocco gesammelten Tenthredinoiden, nebst einigen Bemerkungen über die Tenthredinoidenfauna Nordafrikas. Commentationes biologicae, 3, 8. Finska Vetenskaps-Societeten, Helsingfors 1930.
- Inventa entomologica itineris Hispanici et Maroccani, quod a. 1926 fecerunt Harald et Håkan Lindberg. 10, Über die von Mag.phil. Håkan Lindberg in Spanien gesammelten Tenthredinoiden. Commentationes biologicae, 3, 15. Finska Vetenskaps-Societeten, Helsingfors 1931.
