= Rafael Martínez Escarbassiere =

Venezuelan biologist and malacologist

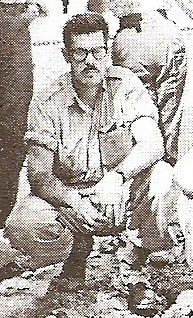
- Rafael Martínez Escarbassiere
- Born: February 3, 1929; Caracas, Venezuela
- Died: January 10, 2022
- Education: Central University of Venezuela (U.C.V.)
- Known for: Research on the continental malacofauna of Venezuela and studies of introduced mollusks such as Lissachatina fulica
- Spouse: Delia Rada de Martínez
- Scientific career
- Fields: Biology, malacology
- Workplaces: Institute of Tropical Zoology, Central University of Venezuela

Rafael Martínez Escarbassiere (February 3, 1929 – January 10, 2022) was a Venezuelan malacologist who graduated from the Central University of Venezuela in 1960. He was affectionately known among colleagues and students as “El Gurú”.

== Biography ==
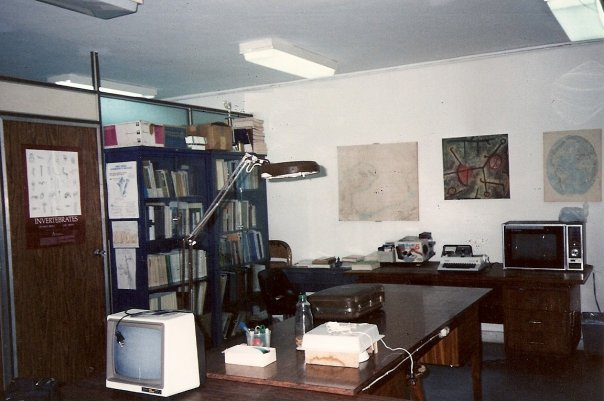
IZT Invertebrate Biology Laboratory, circa 1990

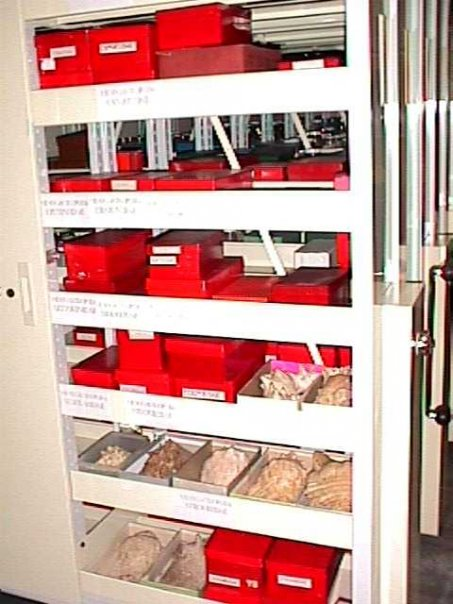
IZT Mollusk Collection, Museum of Biology, Central University of Venezuela

Rafael Martínez Escarbassiere was born in Caracas on February 3, 1929, the son of Rafael Martínez Pozueta and Juliana Escarbassiere de Martínez. He was married to Delia Rada de Martínez. He graduated from the School of Biology at the Central University of Venezuela (U.C.V.) in 1960.

Upon graduation, he joined the staff of the Oceanographic Institute of the Universidad de Oriente, where he studied several marine mollusks such as Crassostrea rhizophorae, Bittium caraboboensis, and Perna perna.

Between 1962 and 1963, he traveled to Denmark for an internship at the Marine Biology Laboratory of the University of Copenhagen. Upon his return, he served as Acting Director of the Fisheries Research Center (CIP-MAC) and, from 1965 to 1966, as Acting Director of the Regional Center for the Evaluation of Fishery Resources (MAC-FAO-PUND).

In 1968 Martínez joined the staff of the Institute of Tropical Zoology and Ecology at the Central University of Venezuela, where he also taught Principles of Biology, Animal Biology, and Invertebrate Biology in the School of Biology until his retirement in 1992.

During his time at the Institute, Martínez developed a research program focused on the study of Venezuelan continental mollusks. His studies included investigations on pulmonate snails from the Caracas Valley, members of the family Ampullariidae,

Another research line Martínez developed was on introduced mollusk species in Venezuela, a topic he had studied since the 1980s. Among the species he identified in wild habitats were Corbicula manilensis, Babylonia aerolara, and Musculina senhousia. The introduced mollusk to which he devoted most of his later research, due to its medical and agricultural importance, was the giant African snail (Lissachatina fulica). This species is included among the 100 of the world's worst invasive alien species.
