= Hendrik Weyenbergh Jr. =

Dutch zoologist (1842–1885)

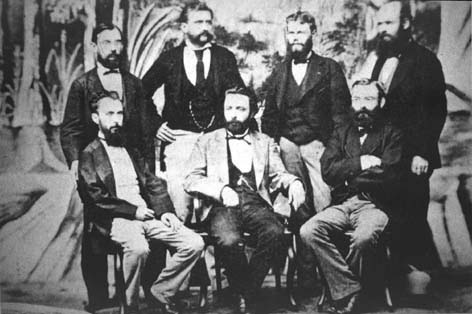
- Members of the National Academy of Sciences (Córdoba) in 1876. Weyenbergh is seated, the first from the left.
- Born: December 6, 1842; Haarlem, Netherlands
- Died: July 27, 1885 (aged 42); Bloemendaal, Netherlands
- Known for: Founder of the Zoological Museum in Córdoba; co-founder of the Entomological Society of Argentina
- Scientific career
- Fields: Zoology, Entomology, Paleontology

Hendrik Weyenbergh Jr. (6 December 1842 – 27 July 1885) was a Dutch zoologist, entomologist and paleontologist who worked mainly in Argentina.

== Biography ==
Weyenbergh initially studied surgery and obstetrics at the Medical School in Haarlem, graduating at the age of 21. He continued his studies in Utrecht and eventually earned a doctorate at the University of Göttingen with an entomological dissertation. Early on, Weyenbergh expressed his support for Darwin’s theory of evolution.

In 1872, Weyenbergh moved to Argentina at the invitation of Hermann Burmeister. He taught at the Universidad Nacional de Córdoba until he became involved in a conflict between Burmeister and several young European scientists. In his 1873 inaugural lecture, Weyenbergh referred not only to Darwin’s theory of evolution, against which Burmeister was fiercely opposed, but also to Ernst Haeckel’s Generelle Morphologie, which had explicitly criticized Burmeister. Burmeister’s authoritarian stance provoked a revolt among the young European scientists he had himself brought to Argentina. In 1874, this led to the dismissal of Weyenbergh and several of his colleagues, which in turn prompted sharp criticism of Burmeister from European scholars.

Weyenbergh, however, did not leave Córdoba. He founded the Zoological Museum in Córdoba (1873). He also became President of the Argentine Academia Nacional de Ciencias (1878). In 1884, due to illness, he returned to the Netherlands, where he died in 1885.

== Work ==
Weyenbergh was mainly active as an entomologist. He also described several freshwater fish species in Argentina, although he was not an ichthyologist. Many of these are now regarded as synonyms of other taxa, such as Synbranchus doeringii. In addition, he published on fossil insects. The curator of Teylers Museum in Haarlem, T.C. Winkler, purchased several holotypes of species described by Weyenbergh and corresponded extensively with him.
