= Andrzej Pisera =

Polish paleobiologist

- Education: University of Warsaw
- Title: Professor habilitated doctor of Earth Sciences
- Scientific career
- Fields: Paleontology
- Workplaces: Institute of Paleobiology of the Polish Academy of Sciences
- Website: Official page

Andrzej Pisera is a Polish paleoecologist and researcher of fossil and modern red algae, echinoderms, and sponges.

== Biography ==
Pisera studied at the Faculty of Geology, University of Warsaw, where he received his master’s degree in 1974. Since 1981, his career has been associated with the Institute of Paleobiology, Polish Academy of Sciences, where he earned his PhD in 1986 and habilitation in 1998. In 1993–1994, he was a Fulbright Foundation scholar. In 2015, he was awarded the title of professor of Earth Sciences. He is one of the editors of the World Porifera Database, a subproject of the World Register of Marine Species.

== Scientific achievements ==
=== Significance in the history of science ===
Pisera is co-author of Systema Porifera, an authoritative taxonomic revision of all (approx. 680) genera of modern sponges, as well as author of a revision of Upper Jurassic sponges from the Swabian Jura (124 species). Pisera and co-authors also proposed a new model for the formation of the giant spicule (up to 3 m long) in the glass sponge Monorhaphis chuni.

He described numerous new taxa:

- genera of Devonian sponges, including Jazwicella Rigby & Pisera, 2001, Polonospongia Rigby & Pisera, 2001, Astyloscyphia Rigby & Pisera, 2001;
- genera of modern sponges, including Neoschrammeniella Pisera & Lévi, 2002, Isabella Schlacher-Hoenlinger, Pisera & Hooper, 2005, and Levispongia Schuster, Pisera, Ekins & Debitus, 2021;
- numerous species.

== Recognition ==
Three animal species were named in his honor: a fossil (Jurassic) gastropod Buvignieria piserai Kaim, 2004, a fossil (Cretaceous) sponge Laocetis piserai Vodrážka & Crame, 2011, and a modern sponge Neoschrammeniella piserai Carvalho, Cárdenas, Ríos, Cristobo, Rapp & Xavier, 2020.

== Selected publications ==
- Rafowe utwory miocenu z Roztocza zachodniego (1978)
- Tithonian crinoids from Rogoźnik (A. Pisera & J. Dzik, 1979)
- Występowanie, diageneza i oznaczanie kalcytu magnezowego (I. Iwasińska, M. Narkiewicz & A. Pisera, 1981)
- Miocene reefs of the Paratethys (1996)
- Upper Jurassic siliceous sponges from the Swabian Alb (1997)
- Upper Devonian sponges from the Holy Cross Mountains (co-author, 2001)
- Systema Porifera (co-author, 2002)
- Palaeontology of sponges – A review (2006)
- Insights into the structure and morphogenesis of the giant basal spicule of the glass sponge Monorhaphis chuni (A. Pisera et al., 2021)
