= Jan Švábeník =

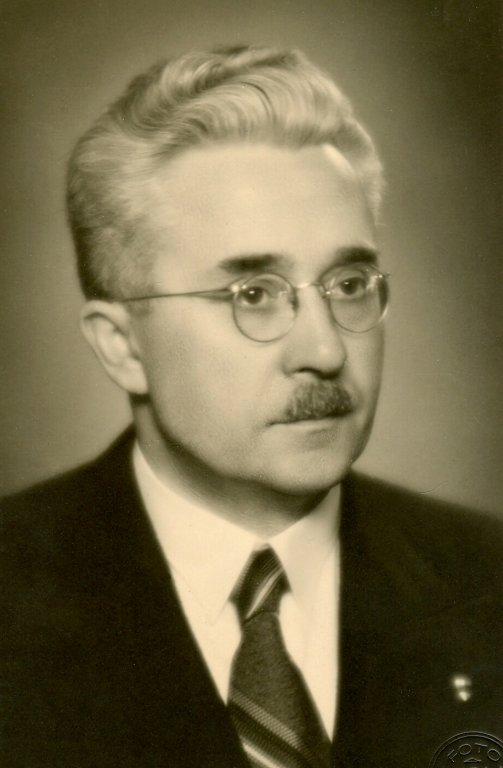
Jan Švábeník in 1925

Jan Švábeník (24 June 1886 – 16 March 1942) was a Czech zoologist and pedagogue. He studied the anatomy of nematomorphs. He was imprisoned at Auschwitz following German invasion and died in the concentration camp.

== Life and work ==
Švábeník was born in Kdousov near Třebíč in landowning family of František and Terezia Robičková. He graduated from the Třebíč gymnasium in 1905 and joined Charles University. Graduating in 1909 he became a teacher at the gymnasium in Valašské Meziříčí, and later at Břeclav. He joined the teacher's institute in 1922 in Brno and from 1935 headed the teacher's institute in Olomouc.

Švábeník was very active in social and cultural activities in Břeclav. He also conducted research in entomology in his spare time and took part in outings of the Brno zoologists. He described the nematomorph species Gordius montenegrinus in 1909. He also studied the metamorphosis of nematomorpha. In 1941 he was arrested by the Gestapo for his association involvement in various groups as a Czech nationalist. He was declared dead at the Auschwitz concentration camp as found on the record for him as prisoner 26468. He was posthumously awarded a Czechoslovak War Cross in 1945. A memorial stolperstein was installed in 2019 at Olomouc on Křížkovského Street.
