= Herbert Franzioni Berla =

Brazilian zoologist (1912–1985)

Herbert Franzoni Berla
- Born: April 7, 1912; Rio de Janeiro, Brazil
- Died: February 10, 1985 (aged 72)
- Known for: Ornithology of Brazil; taxonomy of feather mites
- Scientific career
- Fields: Ornithology, Acarology
- Institutions: Museu Nacional da Universidade Federal do Rio de Janeiro; Universidade Federal do Rio de Janeiro

Herbert Franzoni Berla (7 April 1912 – 10 February 1985) was a Brazilian ornithologist and acarologist.

== Biography ==
Berla was the son of physician Carlos Coimbra Berla and Maria Elisa Franzoni Berla. Motivated by hunting trips with his father, in which he participated from an early age, he soon developed an interest in natural history. He spent part of his childhood and youth in Monte Alto, in the interior of the state of São Paulo, before the family returned to Rio de Janeiro.

In 1932, he completed secondary school at the Ginásio Arte e Instrução in the Cascadura district of Rio de Janeiro while also performing military service. During his studies, he improved his knowledge of English and French, and owing to his Swiss ancestry, he also understood some German.

In the same year, 1932, he began working as a freelancer at the Museu Nacional da Universidade Federal do Rio de Janeiro (MNRJ), then directed by Alípio de Miranda Ribeiro. There he learned collection and preservation techniques and specialized in the preparation of arthropods. In 1933, Berla became a member of the Sociedade Entomológica do Brasil. He was appointed assistant at the National Museum in 1940 and curator in 1941.

His first official expedition took place in February and March 1940, when he accompanied João Moojen to western São Paulo (Ilha Seca) and to Mato Grosso do Sul (Salobra region), as part of a Instituto Oswaldo Cruz expedition. Later that year, he joined a yellow fever research expedition (SEPFA) in northern Espírito Santo, visiting Ibiraçu, São Domingos do Norte, Colatina, Água Boa, and Santa Cruz, alongside Ernst G. Holt, Olivério Pinto, Gentil Dutra, and Leoberto C. Ferreira.

In 1941, Berla began collecting in Pedra Branca in the Serra do Mar. These expeditions led to his first publication in 1944: Lista das aves colecionadas em Pedra Branca, município de Parati, Estado do Rio de Janeiro, com algumas notas sôbre sua biologia in the Boletim do Museu Nacional do Rio de Janeiro.

Between February and April 1942, he collected birds and small mammals at Lagoa Santa, Minas Gerais, producing about 200 study skins that became part of the MNRJ collection. The same year, he was appointed deputy naturalist.

Between June 1944 and May 1945, Berla undertook his most productive expedition, collecting in the Zona da Mata of Pernambuco, a region then poorly studied ornithologically. About 300 skins were collected, and he described the northeastern subspecies of the solitary tinamou, Tinamus solitarius pernambucensis, and provided the first female specimen of Myrmoderus ruficauda soror.

In 1946, Berla published revisions of Pyrrhura pfrimeri (then considered a subspecies of the white-eared parakeet) and described the tricolored tody-tyrant (Poecilotriccus tricolor).

From 1947 onward, much of his material went to U.S. museums in Chicago and Los Angeles. Many specimens were prepared by his wife, Iniah Medeiros Berla (1915–1995), whom he married in 1938. In 1948 he documented a hybrid of the purple-throated euphonia and silver-beaked tanager. In 1954, he described Touit surda ruficauda, a parrot subspecies now considered a synonym of Touit surdus chryseurus.

In 1957, he collected four specimens of the Forbes’s blackbird (Anumara forbesi), a species not rediscovered until the early 1980s. That same year, he became a research assistant with the National Research Council. From 1958 until retirement, he shifted focus to acarology, particularly feather mites, describing one family, 13 genera, and 42 species, as well as revising five previously poorly described species.

He held a Guggenheim Fellowship in 1965–66, during which he visited U.S. institutions and collections. From 1969 to 1980, he was professor at the Universidade Federal do Rio de Janeiro.

== Eponyms ==
Species named in his honor include:

- Paradaemonia berlai (Oiticica, 1946)
- Dicrana herberti (Machado Filho, 1957)
- Nephepeltia berlai (Santos, 1950)
- Oxysarcodixia berlai (Lopes, 1975)
- Tyrannidectes berlai (Mironov, 2008)
