= Cham, Iran =

Cham (Persian: چم) may refer to:

- Cham, Hamadan
- Cham, Isfahan
- Cham, Falavarjan, Isfahan Province
- Cham, Nain, Isfahan Province
- Cham, Behbahan, Khuzestan Province
- Cham, Izeh, Khuzestan Province
- Cham, Ramshir, Khuzestan Province
- Cham, Yazd

== See also ==
- Cham is a common element in Iranian place names; see
