= Cham =

Cham or CHAM may refer to:

== Ethnicities and languages ==
- Chams, people in Vietnam and Cambodia
  - Cham language, the language of the Cham people
    - Cham script
    - Cham (Unicode block), a block of Unicode characters of the Cham script
- Cham Albanians, also spelled Çam, a people originating in northern Greece of Albanian descent
  - Cham Albanian dialect
- Dikaka language, another language also known as Cham

== People ==
- Cham (singer) (born 1979), Jamaica reggae singer known for the single "Ghetto Story"
- Cham., standard author abbreviation for botanist Adelbert von Chamisso (1781–1838)
- Chamillionaire (born 1979), American rapper
- Cham Prasidh (born 1951), Cambodian Minister of Trade
- Adongo Agada Cham (1959–2011), king of the Anuak people of Sudan and Ethiopia
- Jorge Cham (born 1976), comic-book artist
- Patrick Cham (born 1959), French basketball player
- Amédée de Noé (1818–1879), French artist whose pseudonym was "Cham"
- Ham (son of Noah), also spelt Cham
- Cham, a variant in Gambia of the surname Thiam
- Ebony Cham (born 2004), French singer
- Cham, Pseudonym of Italian historian Francesco Carotta

== Places ==
- Cham, Germany, town
- Cham (electoral district), Germany
- Cham (district), Germany
- Cham, Switzerland, a city in the Canton of Zug, Switzerland
- Cham, Iran (disambiguation)
- Chàm Islands, of Vietnam
- Cham, a colloquial name for the French mountain town of Chamonix
- Al Cham, French spelling for Al Sham (comprises Israel, Syria, Lebanon and Jordan)

== Other uses ==
- Cham (novel), by British writer Jonathan Trigell set in Chamonix Mont Blanc
- Cham Bank, a Syrian bank
- Cham dance, a masked dance associated with some sects of Buddhism
- Cham Palaces and Hotels, a Syria hotel chain based in Syria
- CHAM (AM), a radio station in Hamilton, Ontario, Canada
- Cham Wings Airlines, a privately owned Syrian airline
- Children's Hospital at Montefiore, in New York
- Cham, an archaic spelling of Khan
- Cham., taxonomic author abbreviation of German botanist Adelbert von Chamisso (1781–1838)
- Cham or Kopi Cham, Malaysian beverage of coffee and tea
- CHAM!, a fictional J-pop group in the animated film Perfect Blue

== See also ==
- Cha-am district, in Thailand
- Chamcham, or Chomchom, a traditional Bengali sweet
- Chameria, part of Albania inhabited by Cham Albanians
- Kham (disambiguation)
- Chamm, a 2017 Punjabi film
- Çam (disambiguation)
