= Kham (disambiguation) =

Kham is an area of eastern Tibet.

Kham may also refer to:

- Alenka Kham Pičman (1932–2025), Slovenian architect, painter, graphic artist, and industrial designer
- Kham (instrument), a percussion folk instrument from Tripura
- Kham District, a district of Xiangkhouang Province, Laos
- Kham language or Khamkura, the Tibeto-Burman language spoken by Kham Magars
- Kham Magar, an ethnic minority in the Himalayan foothills of western Nepal
- KHAM theory, in the politics of Gujarat
- KHAM, a US radio station
- Lado Kham (born 1901), Slovenian architect and engineer, father of Alenka
- Naw Kham, Burmese drug lord

== See also ==
- Khamba (disambiguation)
- Khampa (disambiguation)
