= Cücük =

Cücük may refer to:

- Cücük, Agdash, a village and municipality in the Aghdash Rayon, Azerbaijan
- Cücük, Akyurt, a neighborhood of the district of Akyurt, Ankara Province, Turkey
