= Chams (disambiguation) =

The Chams are an ethnic group of Southeast Asia.

Chams may also refer to:

- Cham Albanians, an Albanian subgroup formerly residing in Greece
- Chaams (born 1970), Indian actor
- Gustavo Chams (born 1994), Brazilian photographer
- Milan Chams (born 1980), Nepalese director

== See also ==
- Cham (disambiguation)
- Shams (disambiguation)
