= Güzelhisar =

Güzelhisar (literally "beautiful fortress" in Turkish) may refer to the following places in Turkey:

- The former name of Aydın
- Güzelhisar, Akyurt, a neighborhood of the district of Akyurt, Ankara Province
- Güzelhisar Dam
- Güzelhisar, Köprüköy
