= Cam =

Cam or CAM may refer to:

== Science and technology ==
- Cam (mechanism), a mechanical linkage which translates motion
- Camshaft, a shaft with a cam
- Camera or webcam, a device that records images or video

=== In computing ===
- Computer-aided manufacturing, the use of software to control machine tools
- CAM table, to find where to forward a data packet
- Categorical abstract machine in applicative computing
- Computer-aided mural, by digital printing
- Conditional-access module, to access scrambled TV programs
- Content-addressable memory
- Content Assembly Mechanism, for information exchange

=== In biology ===
- Crassulacean acid metabolism, a plant carbon-fixing pathway
- Calmodulin (CaM), a calcium-binding protein
- Cell adhesion molecule, proteins on cell surfaces
- Chorioallantoic membrane, in developing eggs
- CAM (clade), under Diaphoretickes, consisting of Cryptista, Archaeplastida, Microheliella maris
- Complementary and alternative medicine

=== Other science and technology uses ===
- Camelopardalis, a constellation, abbreviated Cam
- Centrifuge Accommodations Module of the International Space Station (canceled)
- Cockpit area microphone, part of an aircraft's cockpit voice recorder
- CAM boot, controlled ankle movement walking boot

== People ==
- Cam (name), a list of people with either the given name or surname
- Cam (singer), American country singer Camaron Marvel Ochs (born 1984)
- Killa Cam, former stage name of American rapper Cam'ron (born 1976)

== Places ==
- Çam, Akyurt, Ankara Province, Turkey, a neighborhood of the District of Akyurt
- Cam, Gloucestershire, a village and civil parish in England
- Cam Loch, Scotland
- Cam Mountains, An Giang Province, Vietnam
- Cam River (disambiguation)
- Cam Brook a small river in Somerset, England

== Arts and entertainment ==
- Caribbean Artists Movement (CAM), cultural initiative begun in London, England, 1966–c. 1972
- Cam (bootleg), a bootleg recording of a film recorded in a movie theater
- Cam (film), a 2018 American horror-thriller film
- Churchie Awards in Media, art awards at the Anglican Church Grammar School in Brisbane, Australia
- Charles Augustus Magnussen, fictional character from Sherlock, owning CAM News
- Cameron "Cam" Watanabe, a character in Power Rangers: Ninja Storm known as the Green Samurai Ranger
- Cameron "Cam" Tucker, a character from comedy series Modern Family

== Businesses and organizations ==
- Caja de Ahorros del Mediterráneo, a Spanish savings bank
- Cam FM, University of Cambridge radio station
- CAM (record company), aka CAM Jazz
- CAM Community School District, a school district in Iowa
- Carrozzeria Autodromo Modena, an Italian bus manufacturer
- Center for Advanced Materials, a research center at Qatar University
- Compagnie des Autobus de Monaco, Monegasque transport company
- Coordinadora Arauco-Malleco, an indigenous Mapuche organization in Chile
- Compagnie Aerienne du Mali, now Air Mali
- Comité d'Action Musulman, a former political party in Mauritius

== Museums ==
- Cartoon Art Museum, an art museum in San Francisco, California, US
- Castle Air Museum, an air museum in Atwater, California, US
- Chinese American Museum, an ethnic museum in Los Angeles, US
- Cincinnati Art Museum, an art museum in Cincinnati, Ohio, US
- Chinese Association of Museums, Taiwan

== In sport and recreation ==
- CAM the Ram, mascot of the athletic teams of Colorado State University
- CAM Timișoara, a former football club (1911–1949) based in Timişoara, Romania
- Clube Atlético Mineiro, a popular Brazilian football team
- Cam ECS-12, a 2014 Nerf Blaster released under the N-Strike Elite series
- In climbing, a spring-loaded camming device
- Central attacking midfielder, a position in association football

== Military ==
- CAM ship (Catapult Aircraft Merchantman), World War II
- Corpo d'Armata Motocorazzato, an Italian Army corps, World War II

== Codes ==
- Camberley railway station, England, station code
- Camberwell railway station, Melbourne, Australia, station code
- Cambodia, IOC country code
- Cambridgeshire, England, Chapman code
- Camden Seaboard Air Line Railway Depot, South Carolina, US, Amtrak station code
- Camai Air a US airline, ICAO designator (see Airline codes-C)

== Other uses ==
- Captive audience meeting, a mandatory anti-union meeting organized by an employer
- Common area maintenance charges, a leasing term
- Tropical Storm Cam (1996)
- Tropical Storm Cam (1999)

== See also ==
- Camming (disambiguation)
- Çam (disambiguation)
- Kam (disambiguation)
- River Cam (disambiguation)
