= Karacakaya =

Karacakaya (literally "roe deer rock" in Turkish) may refer to:

== People ==
- Batuhan Karacakaya (born 1997), Turkish actor

== Places ==
- Karacakaya, Akyurt, a neighborhood of the district of Akyurt, Ankara Province, Turkey
- Karacakaya, Merzifon, a village in the district of Merzifon, Amasya Province, Turkey
- Karacakaya, Taşköprü, a village in Turkey
