= Karayatak =

Karayatak (literally "black bed" in Turkish) may refer to the following places in Turkey:

- Karayatak, Akyurt, a neighborhood of the district of Akyurt, Ankara Province
- Karayatak, Emirdağ, a village in the district of Emirdağ, Afyonkarahisar Province
