= Çam =

Çam (pronounced Cham) may refer to:

== People ==
- Gizem Çam (born 1991), Turkish swimmer
- Serdar Çam (born 1966), Turkish bureaucrat
- Sibel Çam (born 1990), Turkish Paralympian powerlifter

== Places ==
- Çam, Kukës, a village in the municipality of Kukës, Albania
- Çam, Akyurt, a neighbourhood in Ankara Province, Turkey

== Other uses ==
- Cham Albanians, or Çam Albanians, a people originating in northern Greece of Albanian descent
  - Cham Albanian dialect, or Çam Albanian dialect

== See also ==
- Cham (disambiguation)
- Cam (disambiguation)
