= Cam River =

Cam River or River Cam may refer to:

== England ==
- River Cam, Cambridgeshire
- River Cam (Gloucestershire)
- River Cam (Somerset)
- Cam Beck, Cumbria

== New Zealand ==
- Cam River (Marlborough)
- Cam River / Ruataniwha

== Elsewhere ==
- Cam River (Tasmania), Australia
- Cấm River (Vietnam) (Sông Cấm)

== See also ==
- Cam Brook, Somerset, England
- Cam (disambiguation)
