= Uzunlar =

Uzunlar may refer to:

== People ==
- Musa Uzunlar (born 1959), Turkish actor
- Servet Uzunlar (born 1989), Australian soccer player

== Places ==
- Uzunlar, Akyurt, a neighbourhood in Ankara Province, Turkey
- Uzunlar, Hani, a neighbourhood in Diyarbakır Province in Turkey
- Uzunlar, Manavgat, a neighbourhood in Antalya Province, Turkey
- Uzunlar, Sultanhisar, a neighbourhood in Aydın Province, Turkey
