= Büğdüz, Akyurt =

Büğdüz
- Neighbourhood
- Location in Turkey Büğdüz (Turkey Central Anatolia)
- Coordinates: 40.1265°N 33.0433°E
- Country: Turkey
- Province: Ankara
- District: Akyurt
- Population (2022): 973
- Time zone: UTC+3 (TRT)

Büğdüz is a neighbourhood in the municipality and district of Akyurt, Ankara Province, Turkey. Its population is 973 (2022).
