= Samut, Akyurt =

Samut
- Neighbourhood
- Location in Turkey Samut (Turkey Central Anatolia)
- Coordinates: 40.0839°N 33.1633°E
- Country: Turkey
- Province: Ankara
- District: Akyurt
- Population (2022): 140
- Time zone: UTC+3 (TRT)

Samut (formerly: Bozca) is a neighbourhood in the municipality and district of Akyurt, Ankara Province, Turkey. Its population is 140 (2022).
