= Elecik, Akyurt =

Elecik
- Neighbourhood
- Country: Turkey
- Province: Ankara
- District: Akyurt
- Population (2022): 370
- Time zone: UTC+3 (TRT)

Elecik is a neighbourhood in the municipality and district of Akyurt, Ankara Province, Turkey. Its population is 370 (2022).
