= Khampa =

Khampa may refer to:

- Natives of Kham, a historical region of Tibet
  - Khampa language
- Jad people, of Himachal Pradesh and Uttarakhand, India
- Khampa, Russia, a selo in Vilyuysky District, Sakha Republic
- Seuth Khampa (born 1962), Laotian Olympic sprinter

== See also ==
- Kham (disambiguation)
- Khamba (disambiguation)
- Kampa (disambiguation)
