= Ahmetadil, Akyurt =

Ahmetadil
- Neighbourhood
- Location in Turkey Ahmetadil (Turkey Central Anatolia)
- Coordinates: 40°06′N 33°14′E
- Country: Turkey
- Province: Ankara
- District: Akyurt
- Population (2022): 284
- Time zone: UTC+3 (TRT)

Ahmetadil is a neighbourhood in the municipality and district of Akyurt, Ankara Province, Turkey. Its population is 284 (2022).
