= Kızık, Akyurt =

Kızık
- Neighbourhood
- Location in Turkey Kızık (Turkey Central Anatolia)
- Coordinates: 40°07′05″N 33°07′16″E
- Country: Turkey
- Province: Ankara
- District: Akyurt
- Population (2022): 862
- Time zone: UTC+3 (TRT)

Kızık is a neighbourhood in the municipality and district of Akyurt, Ankara Province, Turkey. Its population is 862 (2022).
