= Balıkhisar, Akyurt =

Balıkhisar
- Neighbourhood
- Location in Turkey Balıkhisar (Turkey Central Anatolia)
- Coordinates: 40.1034°N 33.0018°E
- Country: Turkey
- Province: Ankara
- District: Akyurt
- Population (2022): 964
- Time zone: UTC+3 (TRT)

Balıkhisar is a neighbourhood of the municipality and district of Akyurt, Ankara Province, Turkey. Its population is 964 (2022).

In the 20th century, Balıkhisar was a fruit producing region, described by the British in 1920 as having the "finest fruit in Turkey."
