= Çınar, Akyurt =

Çınar
- Neighbourhood
- Country: Turkey
- Province: Ankara
- District: Akyurt
- Population (2022): 259
- Time zone: UTC+3 (TRT)

Çınar is a neighbourhood in the municipality and district of Akyurt, Ankara Province, Turkey. Its population is 259 (2022).
