= Karacalar, Akyurt =

Karacalar
- Neighbourhood
- Country: Turkey
- Province: Ankara
- District: Akyurt
- Population (2022): 178
- Time zone: UTC+3 (TRT)

Karacalar is a neighbourhood in the municipality and district of Akyurt, Ankara Province, Turkey. Its population is 178 (2022).
