= Çardakbağı, Akyurt =

Çardakbağı
- Neighbourhood
- Location in Turkey Çardakbağı (Turkey Central Anatolia)
- Coordinates: 40°04′N 33°06′E
- Country: Turkey
- Province: Ankara
- District: Akyurt
- Population (2022): 105
- Time zone: UTC+3 (TRT)

Çardakbağı is a neighborhood of Akyurt District, Ankara Province, Turkey. Its population is 105 (2022).
