= Akyurt =

District in Ankara Province, Turkey

- District and municipality
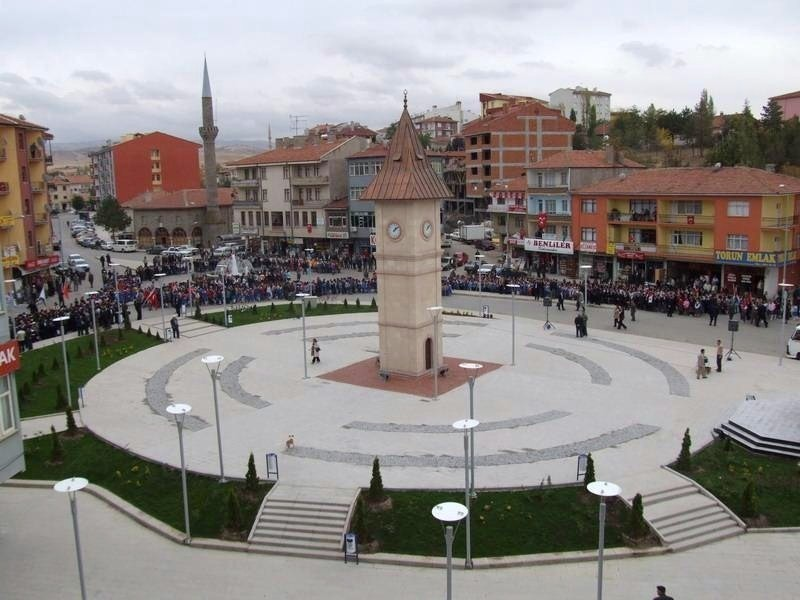
- Urban center of Akyurt

- Map showing Akyurt District in Ankara Province

- Location within Turkey Location within Turkey Central Anatolia
- Coordinates: 40°08′N 33°05′E
- Country: Turkey
- Province: Ankara

Government
  - Mayor: Hilal Ayık (AKP)
- Area: 369 km^{2} (142 sq mi)
- Elevation: 1,084 m (3,556 ft)
- Population (2022): 40,625
  - Density: 110/km^{2} (285/sq mi)
- Time zone: UTC+3 (TRT)
- Area code: 0312
- Website: www.akyurt.bel.tr

Akyurt, formerly Ravlı, is a district of Ankara Province, Turkey. Its area is 369 km^{2}, and its population is 40,625 (2022). Its elevation is 1,084 m (3,556 ft).

== Composition ==
There are 26 neighbourhoods in Akyurt District:

- Ahmetadil
- Atatürk
- Balıkhisar
- Beyazıt
- Büğdüz
- Çamköy
- Çardakbağı
- Çınar
- Cücük
- Elecik
- Güzelhisar
- Haydar
- Kalaba
- Karacakaya
- Karacalar
- Karayatak
- Kızık
- Kozayağı
- Samut
- Saracalar
- Şeyhler
- Teberik
- Timurhan
- Uzunlar
- Yeşiltepe
- Yıldırım
