= Kampa =

Kampa may refer to:

- Kampa Island, an island in the Vltava river and district in Prague
- Museum Kampa, a museum on Kampa Island
- Asháninka, the South American people previously known as Kampa or Campa
- An alternative spelling of Khampa, Tibetan people from the region of Kham

== See also ==
- Khampa (disambiguation)
