= Khamba (disambiguation) =

Khamba refer to:

- Khuman Khamba (also known as Moirang Khamba), a hero in Meitei folklore
- Khamba Thoibi, a legendary Meitei language epic poem about Khuman Khamba
- Tibetans who live in the historic region of Kham which covers parts of modern Qinghai, Western Sichuan, Northern Yunnan and the Tibet Autonomous Region
- Khamba people, of Arunachal Pradesh, India
- Gursimran Khamba, Indian comedian

== See also ==
- Kham (disambiguation)
- Khampa (disambiguation)
