= Cham Jawi =

Variant of the Jawi Arabic script used for the Cham language

Cham Jawi چم جاوي
- Script type: Abjad
- Period: c. 1500 CE to the present
- Direction: Right-to-left
- Languages: Cham (Western Cham)

Related scripts
- Parent systems: Proto-Sinaitic: Phoenician; Aramaic; Nabataean; Arabic; Jawi; Cham Jawi
- Sister systems: Pegon script, Jawoe script

Cham Jawi is a variant of the Jawi adaptation of the Arabic script used to write the Cham language, mainly Western Cham. This variation of writing was developed at the beginning of the arrival of Islam in Champa around the 14th to 15th centuries, mainly due to the influence of the Sultanate of Malacca on the Malay Peninsula.

== Vowels ==
Compared to Malay, the language of the parent script of Cham Jawi, Cham has a richer and larger family of vowels. Malay Jawi, like the Arabic script itself, is an impure Abjad, meaning that most, but not all, vowels are unwritten. In Cham Jawi, the emphasis has been to write most vowels, and to differentiate between them. This has been done by the addition of accents and dots on the three mater lectionis letters, the letters alif (ا), waw (و), and ya (ي), which act as vowel carriers.

There are some issues however, when it has come to the task of standardizing a script that accurately shows vowels. First is the lack of an enforcement or pedagogical mechanism for any single standard. This is augmented by the fact that Cham people are dispersed in Cambodia, Vietnam, and outside of the Cham homeland, in countries such as Malaysia. Second has been the slow development of Arabic keyboard for computers, specifically the slow incorporation of various accents, diacritics, and unique writing features that have long been a central part of Cham literature. Thus over the years, various parallel conventions have come to be followed by different publications and peoples.

Below table is the most comprehensive agreed-upon convention on vowels for Cham. But for example, the vowels ư and ơ, are respectively written in the table below with alif with three dots (اۛ) and alif with an inverted v (اٛ). But, as the three dots character wasn't incorporated into keyboards, they also have been commonly been written as alif with an inverted v (اٛ) and alif with a v (اٚ) respectively. Other sources may write the two vowels with a single letter alif with an inverted v (اٛ)and not differentiate between them.

Cham Jawi vowels
Rumi	Final	Middle (CV)	Middle (CVC)	Monosyllabic (CVC)	Independent (V)	Initial (VC)	Cham script Initial	Cham script Diacritic	IPA
a	◌ـا	◌َ	◌ـا◌	◌َ◌	ا / أ	عا◌	ꨀ	-	[a]
aa	◌ـآ	◌ـآ	◌ـآ◌		-	-	-	◌ꨩ	[aː]
ư (â)	◌ـاۛ	◌ـاۛ	◌ـاۛ◌		اۛ	عاۛ◌	ꨀꨲ	◌ꨲ	[ɨ]
ưư, ươ (ââ)	◌ـاۛۤ	◌ـاۛۤ	◌ـاۛۤ◌		-	عاۛۤ◌	ꨀꨲꨩ	◌ꨲꨩ	[ɨə̯]
ơ (e)	◌ـاٛ	◌ـاٛ	◌ـاٛ◌		اٛ	عاٛ◌	ꨀꨮ	◌ꨮ	[ə]
u	◌ـو	◌ـو	◌ـو◌		او	عو◌	ꨀꨭ	◌ꨭ	[u]
uu	◌ـوۤ	◌ـوۤ	◌ـوۤ◌		-	عو◌	-	◌ꨭꨩ	[uː]
o (ao)	◌ـوٚ	◌ـوٚ	◌ـوٚ◌		اوٚ	عوٚ◌	ꨀꨱ	ꨱ	[ɔ]
oo	◌ـوٚۤ	◌ـوٚۤ	◌ـوٚۤ◌		-	عوٚۤ◌	-	ꨯꨩ	[ɔː]
ô	◌ـوٛ	◌ـوٛ	◌ـوٛ◌		اوٛ	عوٛ◌	ꨅ	ꨯ	[o]
i	◌ـي	◌ـيـ	◌ـیـ◌		ايـ◌	عيـ◌	ꨁ	◌ꨪ	[i]
ii	◌ـيۤ	◌ـيۤـ	◌ـیۤـ◌		-	عيۤـ◌	-	◌ꨫ	[iː]
e (ai)	◌ـيٚ	◌ـيٚـ	◌يٚـ◌		ايٚـ◌	عيٚـ◌	ꨄ	ꨰ	[ɛ]
ee (ia)	◌ـيٚۤ	◌ـيٚۤـ	◌يٚۤـ◌		-	عيٚۤـ◌	-	ꨰꨩ	[ɛː]
ê (é)	◌ـيٛ	◌ـيٛـ	◌يٛـ◌		ايٛـ◌	عيٛـ◌	ꨅꨮ	ꨯꨮ	[e]
êê (éé)	◌ـيٛۤ	◌ـيٛۤـ	◌يٛۤـ◌		-	عيٛۤـ◌	-	ꨯꨮꨩ	[eː]

Below table lists vowel sequences and their representation in Cham Jawi script.

Cham Jawi vowel sequences
Rumi	Cham Jawi	Cham script Diacritic
au	او	◌ꨮꨭ
ao	اوٛ	ꨯꨱ
ai	اي	ꨰ
ơi	اٛي	◌ꨬ
ua	وا	◌ꨶ
uư	واۛ	◌ꨶꨮ
uô	ووٛ	ꨶꨯ
ui	وي	◌ꨬꨭ
oa	وٚا	◌ꨶ
ia	يا	◌ꨳ
iư	ياۛ	◌ꨳꨲ
iơ	ياٛ	◌ꨳꨮ

== Consonants ==
In Cham Jawi, additional characters for nasalised stops not found in the Malay Jawi alphabet have been added:

- پ (nh or ny) (instead of Malay ڽ)
- څ (nj)
- ڎ (đ or nd)

Maintaining consistency in the use of three-dot letters for nasal stop consonants, the letter ڤ has been reassigned to the sound mb (written as pp in Latin), and the letter ف reassigned to the sound p. (The f of Malay is absent in Cham.)

Voiceless aspirate consonants are represented as digraphs using ح:

- كح (kh)
- چح (ch)
- تح (th)
- فح (ph)

Voiced aspirate consonants are represented as digraphs using ه:

- ڬه (gh)
- جه (jh)
- ده (dh)
- به (bh)

The table below illustrates the letters of Cham Jawi, followed by notes for their uses.

Cham Jawi alphabet
Arabic (Cham script) (Latin) [IPA]	أ / ا ^{1} ‌(ꨀ) (a) [∅]/[ʔ]/[a]	ب ‌(ꨝ) (b) [p]	بهـ / به ‌(ꨞ) (bh) [pʰ]	ڢ ‌(ꨡ) (bb / mb) [ɓ]	تـ‌ / ت ^{2} ‌(ꨓ / ꩅ) (t) [t]	تحـ / تح ‌(ꨔ) (th) [tʰ]
Arabic (Cham script) (Latin) [IPA]	ث ^{3} ‌(ꨦ / ꨧ / ꩋ) (s) [s]	ج ‌(ꨎ) (j) [c]	جهـ / جه ‌(ꨏ) (jh) [cʰ]	چ ‌(ꨌ / ꩄ) (c) [c]	چحـ / چح ‌(ꨍ) (ch) [cʰ]	ح ^{4} ‌(ꨨ / ◌ꩍ) (h) [h]/[◌ʰ]
Arabic (Cham script) (Latin) [IPA]	خ ^{3} ‌(ꨇ) (kh) [x]	څ ‌(ꨒ) (nj) [j]	د ‌(ꨕ) (d) [t]	دهـ / ده ‌(ꨖ) (dh) [tʰ]	ذ ^{3} ‌(ꨦ / ꨧ / ꩋ) (z) [z]	ڎ ‌(ꨙ) (đ / nd) [ɗ]
Arabic (Cham script) (Latin) [IPA]	ر ^{5} ‌(ꨣ / ◌ꨴ / ꩉ) (r) [ɣ~r]	ز ^{3} ‌(ꨦ / ꨧ / ꩋ) (z) [z]	س ‌(ꨦ / ꨧ / ꩋ) (s) [s]	ش ^{3} ‌(ꨦ / ꨧ / ꩋ) (x / s) [s]	ص ^{3} ‌(ꨦ / ꨧ / ꩋ) (s) [s]	ض ^{3} ‌(ꨖ) (dh) [tʰ]
Arabic (Cham script) (Latin) [IPA]	ط ^{3} ‌(ꨓ / ꩅ) (t) [t]	ظ ^{3} ‌(ꨦ / ꨧ / ꩋ) (z) [z]	ع ^{6} ‌(ꨀ) ( - ) [∅]	غ ^{5} ‌(ꨣ / ꩉ) (r) [ɣ~r]	ڠ ‌(ꨊ/ꨋ/◌ꩃ/ꩂ) (ng) [ŋ]	ف ‌(ꨚ / ꩇ) (p) [p]
Arabic (Cham script) (Latin) [IPA]	فحـ / فح ‌(ꨜ) (ph) [pʰ]	ڤ ‌(ꨛ) (pp) [p]	ق ^{3} ‌(ꨆ) (q / k) [q~k]	ك ^{7} ‌(ꨆ / ꩀ) (k / c) [k]	كحـ / كح ‌(ꨇ) (kh) [kʰ]	ڬ ‌(ꨈ) (g) [k]
Arabic (Cham script) (Latin) [IPA]	ڬهـ / ڬه ‌(ꨉ) (gh) [kʰ]	ل ‌(ꨤ / ◌ꨵ / ꩊ) (l) [l]	م ‌(ꨟ / ꨠ / ◌ꩌ) (m) [m]	ن ‌(ꨗ / ꨘ / ꩆ) (n) [n]	و^{8} ‌(ꨥ / ꨥ / ꨅ) (w / o / u) [w]/[o]/[∅]	هـ / ه ^{4} ‌(ꨨ / ◌ꩍ) (h) [h]/[◌ʰ]
Arabic (Cham script) (Latin) [IPA]	ة ^{2} ‌(ꩅ) (t) [t]	ي ^{9} ‌(ꨢ / ꩈ / ꨁ) (y / i) [j]/[i]/[∅]	ء ^{7} ‌(ꩀ) (k) [ʔ]			

Notes

1. The letter alif serves as a vowel, or as a carrier of vowel diacritics. This letter can take various types of diacritics to represent different vowel sounds. Please refer to the section on vowels for more detailed information.
2. At the end of the word, the letter ة is used. In all other contexts and locations, the letter تـ ت is used.
3. Mainly used in Arabic loanwords.
4. The two letters حـ ح and هـ ه are homophones, but they are not interchangeable. They can either be standalone consonants, or they can be as part of digpraphs representing aspiration. They follow the following rules:
  - Arabic loanwords are written as is, with no modification.
  - The letter حـ ح is used for writing of the "h" sound at the beginning of syllables in a multi-syllabic word.
  - The letter هـ ه is used for writing of the "h" sound at the beginning of a syllable in a one-syllable word.
  - The letter هـ ه is used for writing of the "h" sound at the end of a syllable in any word.
  - The letter حـ ح is used as part of a digraph to represent an aspirated consonant, if the leading consonant is a voiceless letter (k, c, t, p).
  - The letter هـ ه is used as part of a digraph to represent an aspirated consonant, if the leading consonant is a voiced letter (g, j, d, b).
5. The two letters ر and غ are homophones. In Arabic loanwords, they are use unmodified. In every other instance, the letter غ is preferred, corresponding to the sound [ɣ]. However, there are dialects of Cham where these letters are pronounced as a thrill, [r]. Thus, variations in orthographic convention do exist. The median consonant (◌ꨴ) corresponding to a mid-syllable sound "CrV" or "CrVC" is written with the letter ر.
6. The letter ع doesn't represent any sound of its own. But it serves a specific purpose. This letter functions as a leading null letter in syllables that start with a vowel, in "VC" syllables. This applies to beginning of words as well as in the middle of words. In Arabic loanwords, the letter ئ may alternatively be used.
7. At the end of a syllable, the latin "-k" is pronounced as a glottal stop, and written as a hamza ء. When there is an actual /k/ sound at the end of a syllable, in Latin orthography, an alternative letter may be used, such as "c". In these instances, the word is written with an Arabic kaf letter, ك. In other instances, the letter ك is used.
8. The letter waw serves as a consonant ([w]), a vowel, or as a carrier of vowel diacritics. This letter can take various types of diacritics to represent different vowel sounds. Please refer to the section on vowels for more detailed information.
9. The letter ya serves as a consonant ([j]), a vowel, or as a carrier of vowel diacritics. This letter can take various types of diacritics to represent different vowel sounds. Please refer to the section on vowels for more detailed information.

== Reduplication ==
In Cham Jawi, Reduplication is done in a manner similar to Jawi script and Pegon script, that is with the use of the numeral "٢" right after the base word.

While suffixed, the numeral "٢" comes in between the base word and the suffix, effectively being in the middle of the word.

== Sample text ==
Below is a sample text in Cham, in Rumi, Jawi, and Cham scripts. This text is the translation of a famous Vietnamese short poem.

English translation	Loss of money; Sad for a few days Loss of friends; Sad for a few months Loss of girlfriend; Sad for a few years Loss of mother; Sad for life
Cham Rumi script	Lahik jiên; drut druy hadôm harei Lahik sabat; duk duy hadôm bilaan Lahik payô; padrut padruy hadôm thun Lahik Amêk; su-uk su-uôn ha umôr
Cham Jawi script	لحيء جييٛن؛ دروت دروي حدوٛم حغاٛي لحيء سباة؛ دوء دوي حدوٛم بيلآن لحيء فيوٛ؛ فدروت فدروي حدوٛم تهون لحيء أميٛء؛ سوعوء سوعووٛن ها عوموٛر
Cham script	ꨤꨨꨪꩀ ꨎꨳꨯꨮꩆ ꨕꨴꨭꩅ ꨕꨴꨭꩈ ꨨꨕꨯꩌ ꨨꨣꨬ ꨤꨨꨪꩀ ꨧꨝꩅ ꨕꨭꩀ ꨕꨭꩈ ꨨꨕꨯꩌ ꨝꨪꨤꨩꩆ ꨤꨨꨪꩀ ꨚꨢꨯꨩ ꨚꨕꨴꨭꩅ ꨚꨕꨴꨭꩈ ꨨꨕꨯꩌ ꨔꨭꩆ ꨤꨨꨪꩀ ꨀꨟꨯꨮꩀ ꨧꨭꨂꩀ ꨧꨭꨂꨅꩆ ꨨꨩ ꨂꨟꨯꩉ
Vietnamese original	Mất tiền; Buồn vài ngày Mất bạn; Buồn vài tháng Mất gấu; Buồn vài năm Mất mẹ; Buồn cả đời

== See also ==
- Cham language
- Cham script
