= Saracalar, Akyurt =

Saracalar
- Neighbourhood
- Location in Turkey Saracalar (Turkey Central Anatolia)
- Coordinates: 40°04′N 32°59′E
- Country: Turkey
- Province: Ankara
- District: Akyurt
- Population (2022): 1,148
- Time zone: UTC+3 (TRT)

Saracalar is a neighbourhood in the municipality and district of Akyurt, Ankara Province, Turkey. Its population is 1,148 (2022).
