= Cham (Unicode block) =

- Range: U+AA00..U+AA5F (96 code points)
- Plane: BMP
- Scripts: Cham
- Major alphabets: Eastern Cham
- Assigned: 83 code points
- Unused: 13 reserved code points

Unicode version history
- 5.1 (2008): 83 (+83)

Unicode documentation
- Code chart ∣ Web page

Cham is a Unicode block containing characters of the Cham script, which is used for writing the Cham language, primarily used for the Eastern dialect in Cambodia and Vietnam.

A separate block for Western Cham, used in Cambodia, was first proposed to Unicode in 2016. As of May 2022 it is still being finalized.

Cham^{[1]}^{[2]} Official Unicode Consortium code chart (PDF)
	0	1	2	3	4	5	6	7	8	9	A	B	C	D	E	F
U+AA0x	ꨀ	ꨁ	ꨂ	ꨃ	ꨄ	ꨅ	ꨆ	ꨇ	ꨈ	ꨉ	ꨊ	ꨋ	ꨌ	ꨍ	ꨎ	ꨏ
U+AA1x	ꨐ	ꨑ	ꨒ	ꨓ	ꨔ	ꨕ	ꨖ	ꨗ	ꨘ	ꨙ	ꨚ	ꨛ	ꨜ	ꨝ	ꨞ	ꨟ
U+AA2x	ꨠ	ꨡ	ꨢ	ꨣ	ꨤ	ꨥ	ꨦ	ꨧ	ꨨ	ꨩ	ꨪ	ꨫ	ꨬ	ꨭ	ꨮ	ꨯ
U+AA3x	ꨰ	ꨱ	ꨲ	ꨳ	ꨴ	ꨵ	ꨶ									
U+AA4x	ꩀ	ꩁ	ꩂ	ꩃ	ꩄ	ꩅ	ꩆ	ꩇ	ꩈ	ꩉ	ꩊ	ꩋ	ꩌ	ꩍ		
U+AA5x	꩐	꩑	꩒	꩓	꩔	꩕	꩖	꩗	꩘	꩙			꩜	꩝	꩞	꩟
Notes: 1. As of Unicode version 16.0; 2. Grey areas indicate non-assigned code points

== History ==
The following Unicode-related documents record the purpose and process of defining specific characters in the Cham block:

Version	Final code points (Note: Proposed code points and characters names may differ from final code points and names)	Count	L2 ID	WG2 ID	Document
5.1	U+AA00..AA36, AA40..AA4D, AA50..AA59, AA5C..AA5F	83		N1126	Cham script [proposal summary form], 1994-10-14
5.1	U+AA00..AA36, AA40..AA4D, AA50..AA59, AA5C..AA5F	83		N1203	Umamaheswaran, V. S.; Ksar, Mike (1995-05-03), "6.1.2.2", Unconfirmed minutes of SC2/WG2 Meeting 27, Geneva
5.1	U+AA00..AA36, AA40..AA4D, AA50..AA59, AA5C..AA5F	83	L2/97-143	N1578	Everson, Michael (1997-04-06), Cham encoding discussion
5.1	U+AA00..AA36, AA40..AA4D, AA50..AA59, AA5C..AA5F	83	L2/97-124	N1559	Everson, Michael (1997-05-01), Proposal for encoding the Cham script in ISO/IEC 10646
5.1	U+AA00..AA36, AA40..AA4D, AA50..AA59, AA5C..AA5F	83	L2/97-288	N1603	Umamaheswaran, V. S. (1997-10-24), "8.22", Unconfirmed Meeting Minutes, WG 2 Meeting # 33, Heraklion, Crete, Greece, 20 June – 4 July 1997
5.1	U+AA00..AA36, AA40..AA4D, AA50..AA59, AA5C..AA5F	83	L2/99-081	N1960	Everson, Michael (1999-02-01), Response to Ngo Trung Viet on feedback from Cham experts
5.1	U+AA00..AA36, AA40..AA4D, AA50..AA59, AA5C..AA5F	83		N1997	Nhan, Ngo Than (1999-02-26), Response to Michael Everson
5.1	U+AA00..AA36, AA40..AA4D, AA50..AA59, AA5C..AA5F	83	L2/06-257	N3120	Everson, Michael (2006-08-06), Proposal for encoding the Cham script in the BMP of the UCS
5.1	U+AA00..AA36, AA40..AA4D, AA50..AA59, AA5C..AA5F	83	L2/06-231		Moore, Lisa (2006-08-17), "C.14", UTC #108 Minutes
5.1	U+AA00..AA36, AA40..AA4D, AA50..AA59, AA5C..AA5F	83		N3153 (pdf, doc)	Umamaheswaran, V. S. (2007-02-16), "M49.18", Unconfirmed minutes of WG 2 meeting 49 AIST, Akihabara, Tokyo, Japan; 2006-09-25/29
