= Alenka Kham Pičman =

Slovenian architect and artist (1932–2025)

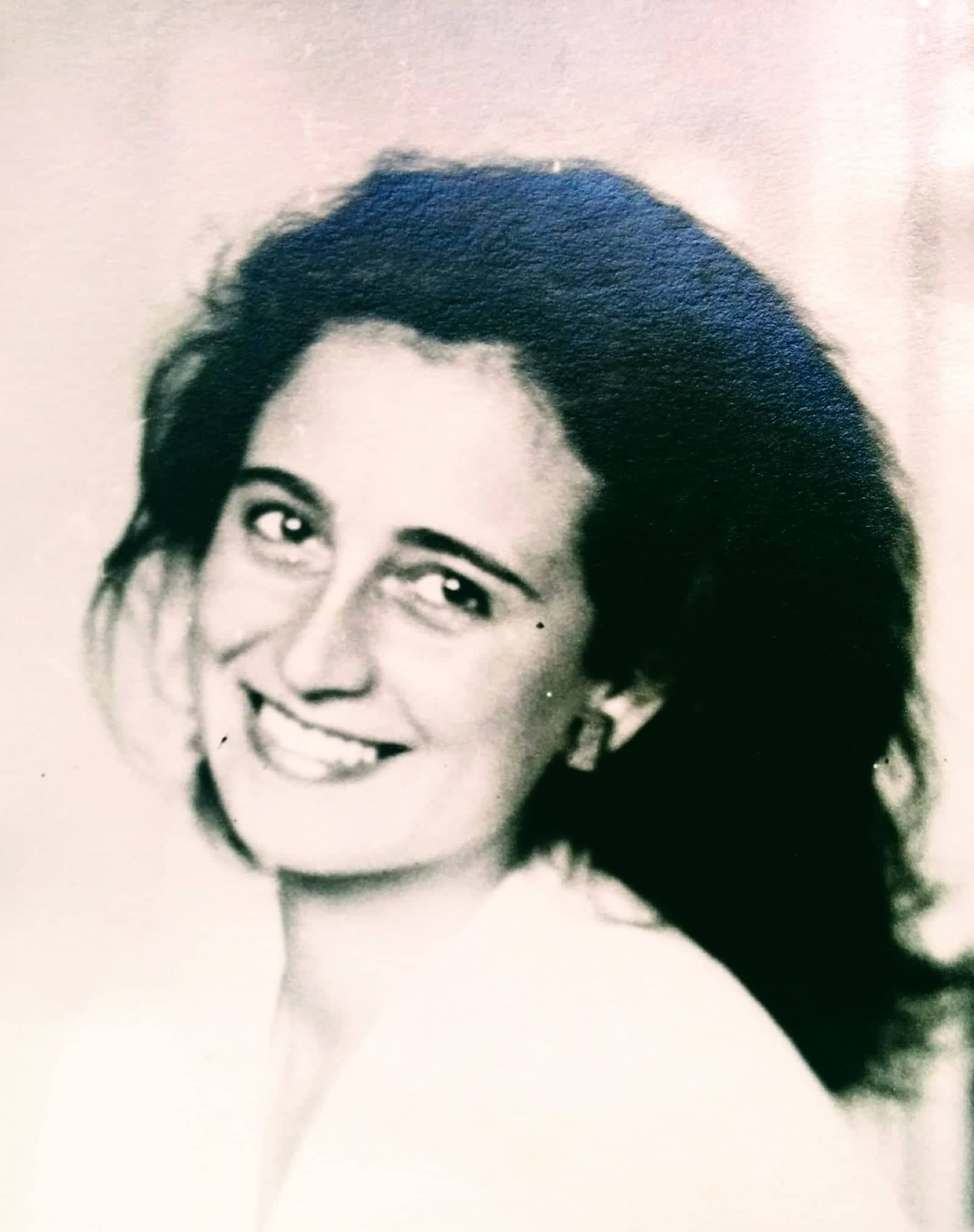
- Born: 22 January 1932; Ljubljana, Slovenia
- Died: 23 May 2025 (aged 93); Kranj, Slovenia
- Occupation(s): Architect, painter, graphic artist, industrial designer

Alenka Kham Pičman (22 January 1932 – 23 May 2025) was a Slovenian architect, painter, graphic artist and industrial designer.

== Life and career ==
Kham Pičman was born on 22 January 1932 as the first of three daughters of architect and engineer Lado Kham. She graduated in 1956 from the Faculty of Architecture under Prof. Jože Plečnik and then in 1975 from the Academy of Fine Arts in Ljubljana, where she also continued her postgraduate studies in graphic arts with Prof. Marjan Pogačnik, which she completed in 1979 with the theoretical postgraduate thesis The Function of the Image in the Contemporary Interior.

After graduating in architecture, she first got a job in the office of architect Danilo Fürst, where she participated in the Pulp Factory project in Banja Luka. Between 1957 and 1961, she worked as an architect in the design department of the Uddevalla varvet of the Thorden-Lines shipyard in Uddevalla, Sweden. There, she was part of a team of interior designers in the Bureau of Interior Design of Ocean Liners. She got her next job in Denmark. In Copenhagen, she got a job in the architectural office of architect Jørgen Bo (de), and then in the studio of architect Professor Palle Suenson, with whom she collaborated on the project of an office building for Burmeister & Wain in Copenhagen.

Her next project was carried out with the architect Jørn Utzon, with whom she designed the Motel on the Caspian Sea. Her last job abroad was in the office of architects Eva and Nils Koppel, with whom she worked on plans for the Technical College in Lyngby, Denmark. After returning to Slovenia, she taught drawing and textile design at the Faculty of Natural Sciences and Technology at the Department of Textile Technology between 1979 and 1983.

Kham Pičman died on 23 May 2025, at the age of 93.
