= Kozayağı, Akyurt =

Kozayağı
- Neighbourhood
- Location in Turkey Kozayağı (Turkey Central Anatolia)
- Coordinates: 40°07′N 33°16′E
- Country: Turkey
- Province: Ankara
- District: Akyurt
- Population (2022): 199
- Time zone: UTC+3 (TRT)

Kozayağı is a neighbourhood in the municipality and district of Akyurt, Ankara Province, Turkey. Its population is 199 (2022).
