= Teberik, Akyurt =

Teberik
- Neighbourhood
- Location in Turkey Teberik (Turkey Central Anatolia)
- Coordinates: 40°03′N 33°04′E
- Country: Turkey
- Province: Ankara
- District: Akyurt
- Population (2022): 185
- Time zone: UTC+3 (TRT)

Teberik (formerly: Doğanoluk) is a neighbourhood in the municipality and district of Akyurt, Ankara Province, Turkey. Its population is 185 (2022).
