= Güzelhisar, Akyurt =

Güzelhisar
- Neighbourhood
- Location in Turkey Güzelhisar (Turkey Central Anatolia)
- Coordinates: 40°3′48″N 33°0′34″E
- Country: Turkey
- Province: Ankara
- District: Akyurt
- Population (2022): 992
- Time zone: UTC+3 (TRT)

Güzelhisar is a neighbourhood in the municipality and district of Akyurt, Ankara Province, Turkey. Its population is 992 (2022).
