= Cücük, Akyurt =

Coordinates: 40.181°N 33.100°E

Cücük
- Neighbourhood
- Location in Turkey Cücük (Turkey Central Anatolia)
- Coordinates
- Country: Turkey
- Province: Ankara
- District: Akyurt
- Population (2022): 425
- Time zone: UTC+3 (TRT)

Cücük is a neighbourhood in the municipality and district of Akyurt, Ankara Province, Turkey. Its population is 425 (2022).
