= Camming =

Camming may refer to:

- Camming out
- Cam (bootleg)
- Spring-loaded camming device
- Electronic camming, a function of motion control
- Using a webcam
- Working as a webcam model
