= Güzelhisar Dam =

Coordinates: 38.7912°N 27.1063°E

- Interactive map of Güzelhisar Dam
- Location: Turkey

Güzelhisar Dam is a dam in İzmir Province, Turkey, built between 1975 and 1981. The development was backed by the Turkish State Hydraulic Works.

In January 2023, a severe drought hit Turkey's 3rd-largest city İzmir, resulting in decreasing water levels in major dams and water occupancy rate of the Güzelhisar Dam decreases from 66.38% to 60.84%.

== See also ==
- List of dams and reservoirs in Turkey
