= Cham script =

Abugida writing system

Cham script Akhara Cam ꨀꨇꩉ ꨌꩌ
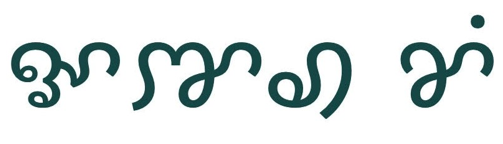
- Script type: Abugida
- Period: c. 350 CE – present
- Direction: Left-to-right
- Languages: Cham, Sanskrit

Related scripts
- Parent systems: Egyptian hieroglyphs: Phoenician; Aramaic; Brahmi; Tamil-Brahmi; Pallava script; Cham script
- Sister systems: Khmer, Kawi, Old Mon, Grantha, Tamil

ISO 15924
- ISO 15924: Cham (358), Cham

Unicode
- Unicode alias: Cham
- Unicode range: U+AA00–U+AA5F

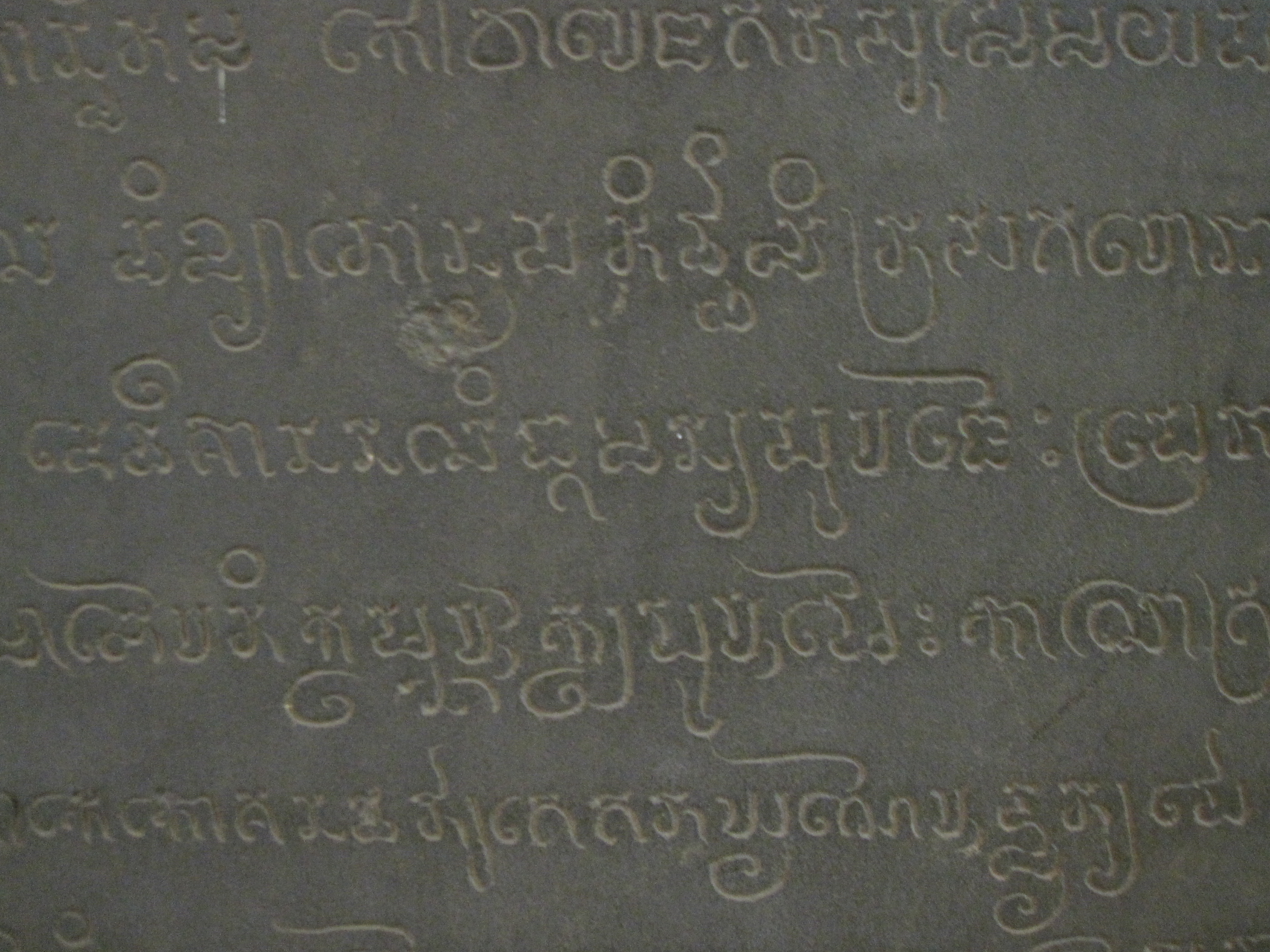
Closeup of the inscription on the Po Nagar stele, 965. The stele describes feats by the Champa kings.

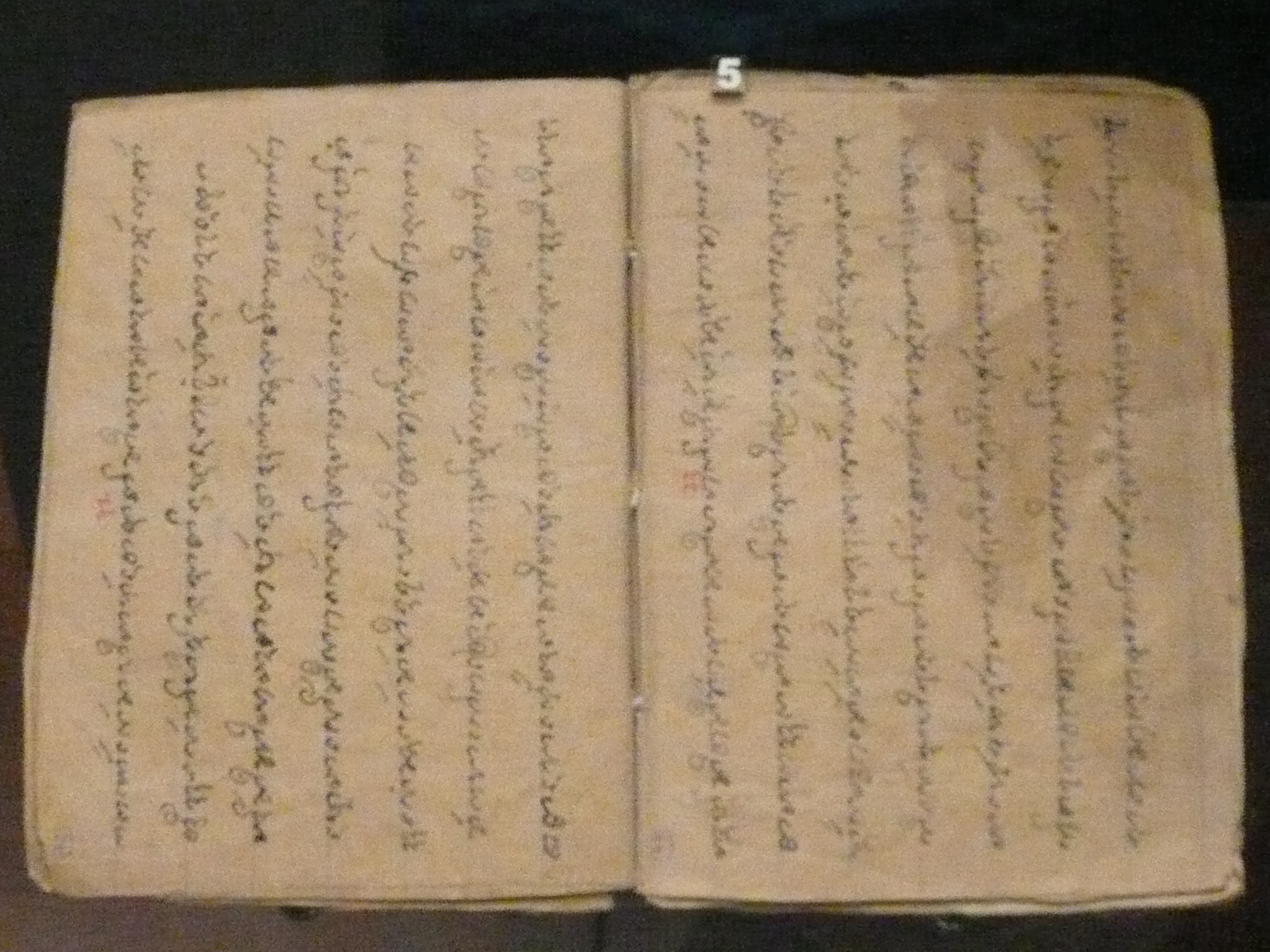
A Champa manuscript recounting the social culture of the Cham community of the early 18th century

The Cham script (Cham: ꨀꨇꩉ ꨌꩌ) is a Brahmic abugida used to write Cham, an Austronesian language spoken by some 245,000 Chams in Vietnam and Cambodia. It is written horizontally left to right, just like other Brahmic abugidas.

== History ==
The Cham script is a descendant of the Brahmi script of India. Cham was one of the first scripts to develop from the Pallava script around 350 CE. It came to Southeast Asia during the expansion of Hinduism and Buddhism. Hindu stone temples of the Champa civilization contain both Sanskrit and Chamic language stone inscriptions. The earliest inscriptions in Vietnam are found in Mỹ Sơn, a temple complex dating from c. 300 CE to c. 1200 CE. The oldest inscription is written in faulty Sanskrit. After this, inscriptions alternate between Sanskrit and the Cham language of the times.

Cham kings studied classical Indian texts, such as the Dharmaśāstra, and inscriptions make reference to Sanskrit literature. Eventually, Cham culture assimilated Hinduism, and Chams were eventually able to adequately express the Hindu religion in their own language. By the 8th century, the Cham script had outgrown Sanskrit and the Cham language was in full use. Most preserved manuscripts focus on religious rituals, epic battles and poems, and myths.

Modern Chamic languages have Southeast Asian areal features of monosyllabicity, tonality, and glottalized consonants. However, they had reached the Southeast Asia mainland disyllabic and non-tonal. The script needed to be altered to meet these changes.

== Variety ==
The Cham now live in two groups: the Western Cham of Cambodia and the Eastern Cham (Panduranga/Phan Rang Cham) of Vietnam. For the first millennium AD, the Chamic languages were a dialect chain along the Vietnam coast. The breakup of this chain into distinct languages occurred once the Vietnamese pushed south, causing most Cham to move back into the highlands while some like Phan Rang Cham became a part of the lowland society ruled by the Vietnamese. The division of Cham into Western and Phan Rang Cham immediately followed the Vietnamese overthrow of the last Cham polity. The Western Cham people are mostly Muslim and therefore prefer the Arabic script. The Eastern Cham are mostly Hindu and continued to use the Indic script. During French colonial times, both groups had to use the Latin alphabet.

There are two varieties of the Cham script: Akhar Thrah (Eastern Cham) and Akhar Srak (Western Cham). The two are distinct enough to be encoded in separate blocks, the Eastern Cham block included in Unicode Standard version 5.1 since March 2008, the Western Cham block approved but still awaiting inclusion as of late 2023. A standard ALA-LC romanization of both varieties, which is based on EFEO romanization of Cham, is available.

== Usage ==
The script is highly valued in Cham culture, but this does not mean that many people are learning it. There have been efforts to simplify the spelling and to promote learning the script, but these have met with limited success. Traditionally, boys learned the script around the age of twelve when they were old and strong enough to tend to the water buffalo. However, women and girls did not typically learn to read. The traditional Indic Cham script is still known and used by Vietnam's Eastern Cham but no longer by the Western Cham.

== Structure ==
Similar to other abugidas, the consonants of Cham have the inherent vowel. Dependent vowel diacritics are used to modify the inherent vowel. Since Cham does not have virāma, special characters should be used for pure consonants. This practice is similar to the chillu consonants of the Malayalam script.

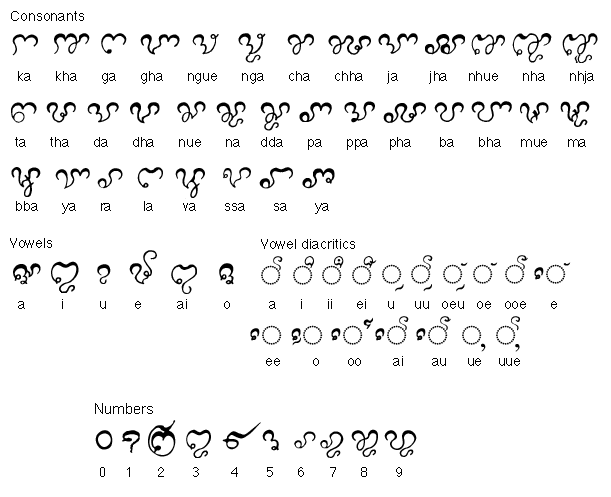
The Eastern Cham script. Nasal consonants are shown both unmarked and with the diacritic kai. The vowel diacritics are shown next to a circle, which indicates their position relative to any of the consonants.

Most consonant letters, such as [b], [t], or [p], include an inherent vowel [a] which does not need to be written. The nasal stops, [m], [n], [ɲ], and [ŋ] (the latter two transliterated ny and ng in the Latin alphabet) are exceptions, and have an inherent vowel [ɨ] (transliterated â). A diacritic called kai, which does not occur with the other consonants, is added below a nasal consonant to write the [a] vowel.

Cham words contain vowel and consonant-vowel (V and CV) syllables, apart from the last, which may also be CVC. There are a few characters for final consonants in the Cham script; other consonants merely extend a longer tail on the right side to indicate the absence of a final vowel.

=== Consonants ===
Plosive consonant letters
Class	Stop					Nasal		Implosive
Class	Voiceless			Voiced				
Class	Unaspirated		Aspirated	Unaspirated	Aspirated	Unaspirated		
Velar	ꨆ ka IPA: [k]		ꨇ kha IPA: [kʰ]	ꨈ ga IPA: [ɡ͡ɣ]~[k]	ꨉ gha IPA: [ɡʱ]~[kʰ]	ꨊ ngâ IPA: [ŋ]	ꨋ nga IPA: [ŋ]	
Palatal	ꨌ ca IPA: [c]		ꨍ cha IPA: [cʰ]	ꨎ ja IPA: [d͡ʑ]~[c]	ꨏ jha IPA: [d͡ʑʱ]~[cʰ]	ꨐ nyâ IPA: [ɲ]	ꨑ nya IPA: [ɲ]	ꨒ nja IPA: [j]
Dental	ꨓ ta IPA: [t̪]		ꨔ tha IPA: [t̪ʰ]	ꨕ da IPA: [d̪]~[t̪]	ꨖ dha IPA: [d̪ʱ]~[t̪ʰ]	ꨗ nâ IPA: [n]	ꨘ na IPA: [n]	ꨙ nda IPA: [ɗ]
Labial	ꨚ pa IPA: [p]	ꨛ ppa IPA: [p]	ꨜ pha IPA: [pʰ]	ꨝ ba IPA: [b]~[p]	ꨞ bha IPA: [bʱ]~[pʰ]	ꨟ mâ IPA: [m]	ꨠ ma IPA: [m]	ꨡ mba IPA: [ɓ]

Non-Plosive consonant letters
Liquid				Fricative		
Palatal	Retroflex	Dental	Labial	Dental		Glottal
ꨢ ya IPA: [j]	ꨣ ra IPA: [ɾ]	ꨤ la IPA: [l]	ꨥ wa IPA: [w]	ꨦ ṣa IPA: [s]	ꨧ sa IPA: [s]	ꨨ ha IPA: [h]

=== Medial consonants ===
Medial consonants (Consonant signs)
Diacritic	◌ꨳ -ia	◌ꨴ -ra	◌ꨵ -la	◌ꨶ -ua
Example	ꨆꨳ kia	ꨆꨴ kra	ꨆꨵ kla	ꨆꨶ kua

=== Final consonants ===
Cham does not employ a virama to suppress vowels. Final consonants are indicated in one of three ways: an explicit final consonant letter, a combining diacritic mark, or by ꨥ.

Final consonant letters
ꩀ -k	ꩂ -ng	ꩄ -c	ꩅ -t	ꩆ -n	ꩇ -p	ꩈ -y	ꩉ -r	ꩊ -l	ꨥ -w	ꩋ -ṣ

=== Independent vowels ===
Six of the initial vowels are represented with unique letters:

Independent Cham vowels
ꨀ a	ꨁ i	ꨂ u	ꨃ é	ꨄ ai	ꨅ o

=== Dependent vowels ===
Other initial vowels are represented by adding a diacritic to the letter ꨀ (a). The same diacritics are used with consonants to change their inherent vowel:

Dependent Cham vowels
	-ā	-i	-ī	-ei	-u	-ū	-e	-ē	
diacritics	◌ꨩ	◌ꨪ	◌ꨫ	◌ꨬ	◌ꨭ	◌ꨭꨩ	◌ꨮ	◌ꨮꨩ	
shown with ꨆ (ka)	ꨆꨩ	ꨆꨪ	ꨆꨫ	ꨆꨬ	ꨆꨭ	ꨆꨭꨩ	ꨆꨮ	ꨆꨮꨩ	
	-é	-é	-o	-ō	-ai	-ao	-â	-â	-au
diacritics	ꨯꨮ	ꨯꨮꨩ	ꨯ	ꨯꨩ	ꨰ	ꨯꨱ	◌ꨲ	◌ꨲꨩ	◌ꨮꨭ
shown with ꨆ (ka)	ꨆꨯꨮ	ꨆꨯꨮꨩ	ꨆꨯ	ꨆꨯꨩ	ꨆꨰ	ꨆꨯꨱ	ꨆꨲ	ꨆꨲꨩ	ꨆꨮꨭ

== Numerals ==
Cham has a distinctive set of digits:

Cham numerals	0 ꩐	1 ꩑	2 ꩒	3 ꩓	4 ꩔	5 ꩕	6 ꩖	7 ꩗	8 ꩘	9 ꩙
Names	thaoh ꨔꨯꨱꩍ	sa ꨧ	dua ꨕꨶ	klau ꨆꨵꨮꨭ	pak ꨚꩀ	limâ ꨤꨪꨟ	nam ꨗꩌ	tajuh ꨓꨎꨭꩍ	dalapan ꨕꨤꨚꩆ	salapan ꨧꨤꨚꩆ

== Other symbols ==
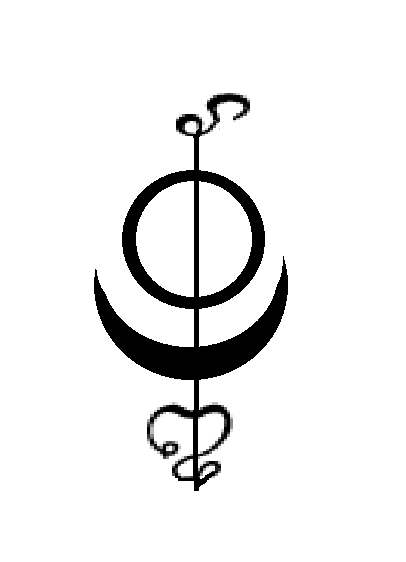
Cham-Homkar (Om) symbol (Note: ꨀꨯꨱꩌ (U+AA00 & U+AA2F & U+AA31 & U+AA4C))

Punctuation
Symbol	Name	Function
꩜	Spiral	Mark the beginning of a section.
꩝	Danda	Text break
꩞	Double Danda	Text break with progressive values of finality
꩟	Triple Danda	Text break with progressive values of finality

== Unicode ==
Cham script was added to the Unicode Standard in April, 2008 with the release of version 5.1.

The Unicode block for Cham is U+AA00–U+AA5F:

Cham^{[1]}^{[2]} Official Unicode Consortium code chart (PDF)
	0	1	2	3	4	5	6	7	8	9	A	B	C	D	E	F
U+AA0x	ꨀ	ꨁ	ꨂ	ꨃ	ꨄ	ꨅ	ꨆ	ꨇ	ꨈ	ꨉ	ꨊ	ꨋ	ꨌ	ꨍ	ꨎ	ꨏ
U+AA1x	ꨐ	ꨑ	ꨒ	ꨓ	ꨔ	ꨕ	ꨖ	ꨗ	ꨘ	ꨙ	ꨚ	ꨛ	ꨜ	ꨝ	ꨞ	ꨟ
U+AA2x	ꨠ	ꨡ	ꨢ	ꨣ	ꨤ	ꨥ	ꨦ	ꨧ	ꨨ	ꨩ	ꨪ	ꨫ	ꨬ	ꨭ	ꨮ	ꨯ
U+AA3x	ꨰ	ꨱ	ꨲ	ꨳ	ꨴ	ꨵ	ꨶ									
U+AA4x	ꩀ	ꩁ	ꩂ	ꩃ	ꩄ	ꩅ	ꩆ	ꩇ	ꩈ	ꩉ	ꩊ	ꩋ	ꩌ	ꩍ		
U+AA5x	꩐	꩑	꩒	꩓	꩔	꩕	꩖	꩗	꩘	꩙			꩜	꩝	꩞	꩟
Notes 1.As of Unicode version 18.0 2.Grey areas indicate non-assigned code points

== Sample text ==
Below is a sample text in Cham, in Rumi, Jawi, and Cham scripts. This text is the translation of a Vietnamese short poem.

English Translation	Loss of money; Sad for a few days Loss of friends; Sad for a few months Loss of girlfriend; Sad for a few years Loss of mother; Sad for life
Cham Rumi Script	Lahik jiên; drut druy hadôm harei Lahik sabat; duk duy hadôm bilaan Lahik payô; padrut padruy hadôm thun Lahik Amêk; su-uk su-uôn ha umôr
Cham Jawi Script	لحيء جييٛن؛ دروت دروي حدوٛم حغاٛي لحيء سباة؛ دوء دوي حدوٛم بيلآن لحيء فيوٛ؛ فدروت فدروي حدوٛم تهون لحيء أميٛء؛ سوعوء سوعووٛن ها عوموٛر
Cham Script	ꨤꨨꨪꩀ ꨎꨳꨯꨮꩆ ꨕꨴꨭꩅ ꨕꨴꨭꩈ ꨨꨕꨯꩌ ꨨꨣꨬ ꨤꨨꨪꩀ ꨧꨝꩅ ꨕꨭꩀ ꨕꨭꩈ ꨨꨕꨯꩌ ꨝꨪꨤꨩꩆ ꨤꨨꨪꩀ ꨚꨢꨯꨩ ꨚꨕꨴꨭꩅ ꨚꨕꨴꨭꩈ ꨨꨕꨯꩌ ꨔꨭꩆ ꨤꨨꨪꩀ ꨀꨟꨯꨮꩀ ꨧꨭꨂꩀ ꨧꨭꨂꨅꩆ ꨨꨩ ꨂꨟꨯꩉ
Vietnamese Original	Mất tiền; Buồn vài ngày Mất bạn; Buồn vài tháng Mất gấu; Buồn vài năm Mất mẹ; Buồn cả đời

== Bibliography ==
- Marrison, Geoffrey Edward (1975), "The Early Cham language and its relation to Malay", Journal of the Malaysian Branch of the Royal Asiatic Society, 48 (2 (228)): 52–59, JSTOR 41492110
- Etienne Aymonier, Antoine Cabaton (1906). Dictionnaire čam-français. Vol. 7 of Publications de l'École française d'Extrême-Orient. E. Leroux.
- Blood, Doris (1980a). Cham literacy: the struggle between old and new (a case study). Notes on Literacy 12, 6–9.
- Blood, Doris (1980b). The script as a cohesive factor in Cham society. In Notes from Indochina, Marilyn Gregersen and Dorothy Thomas (eds.), 35–44. Dallas: International Museum of Cultures.
- Blood, Doris E. 2008. The ascendancy of the Cham script: how a literacy workshop became the catalyst. International Journal of the Sociology of Language 192:45-56.
- Brunelle, Marc. 2008. Diglossia, Bilingualism, and the Revitalization of Written Eastern Cham. Language Documentation & Conservation 2.1: 28–46. (Web based journal)
- Moussay, Gerard (1971). Dictionnaire Cam-Vietnamien-Français. Phan Rang: Centre Culturel Cam.
- Trankell, Ing-Britt and Jan Ovesen (2004). Muslim minorities in Cambodia. NIASnytt 4, 22–24. (Also on Web)
- R. Malatesha Joshi, Catherine McBride(2019). Handbook of Literacy in Akshara Orthography
