= Cham, Yazd =

Cham چم
- Village
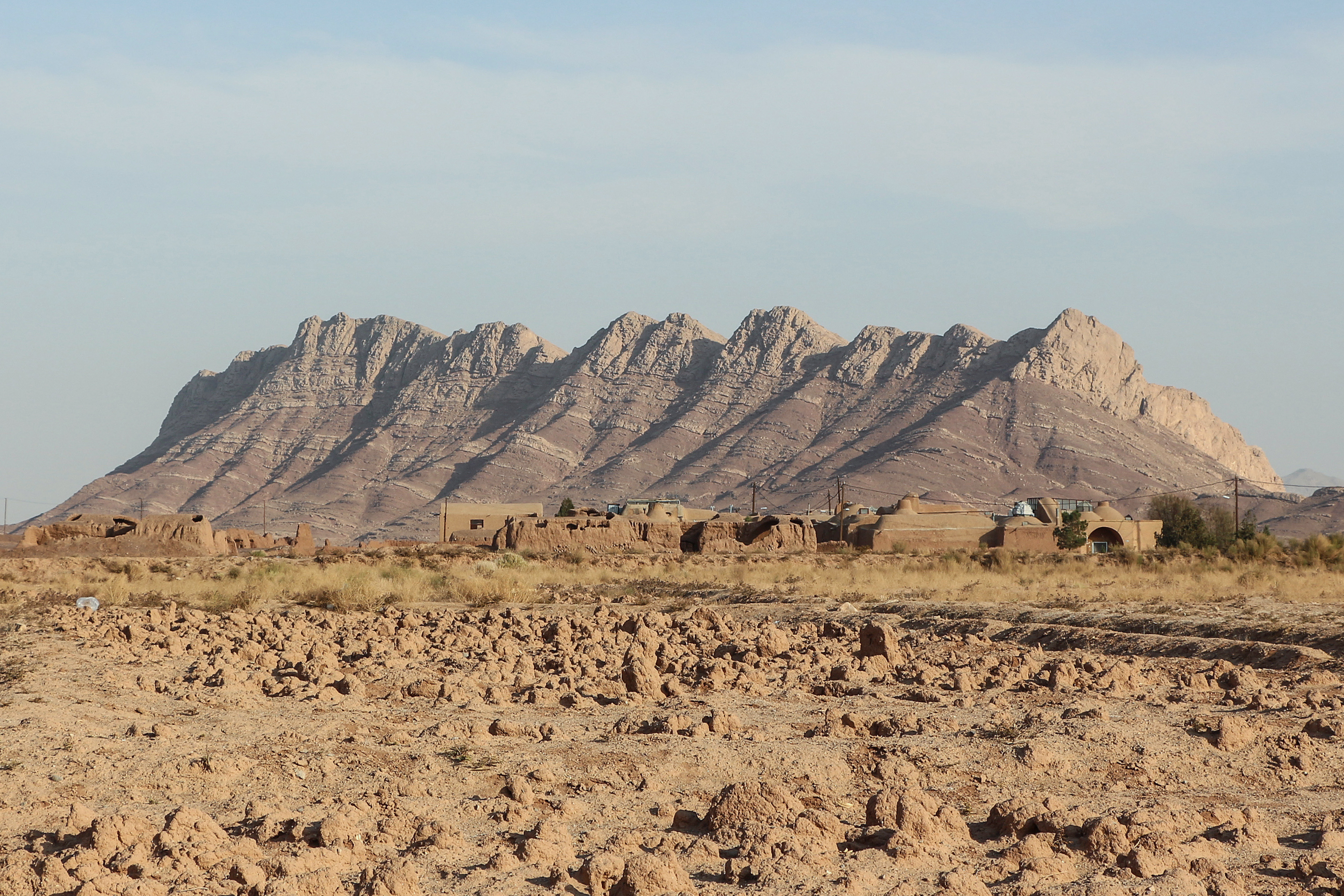
- Village of Cham

- Location within Iran
- Coordinates: 31°47′20″N 54°15′23″E
- Country: Iran
- Province: Yazd
- County: Taft
- Bakhsh: Central
- Rural District: Pishkuh

Population (2006)
  - Total: 11
- Time zone: UTC+3:30 (IRST)
  - Summer (DST): UTC+4:30 (IRDT)

Cham (Persian: چم) is a village in Pishkuh Rural District, in the Central District of Taft County, Yazd Province, Iran. At the 2006 census, its population was 11, in 5 families.
