= Cücük, Agdash =

Cücük
- Municipality
- Location within Azerbaijan
- Coordinates: 40°36′33″N 47°26′04″E
- Country: Azerbaijan
- Rayon: Agdash

Population
  - Total: 503
- Time zone: UTC+4 (AZT)
  - Summer (DST): UTC+5 (AZT)

Cücük (also, Cucuk, Chodzhuk, and Dzhyudzhyuk) is a village and municipality in the Agdash Rayon of Azerbaijan. It has a population of 503.
