= Cham, Izeh =

Cham چم
- Village
- Location within Iran
- Coordinates: 31°55′59″N 50°01′15″E
- Country: Iran
- Province: Khuzestan
- County: Izeh
- Bakhsh: Central
- Rural District: Howmeh-ye Sharqi

Population (2006)
  - Total: 42
- Time zone: UTC+3:30 (IRST)
  - Summer (DST): UTC+4:30 (IRDT)

Cham (Persian: چم) is a village in Howmeh-ye Sharqi Rural District, in the Central District of Izeh County, Khuzestan Province, Iran. As of the 2006 census, its population was 42, in 8 families.
