= Cham-e Anayeh =

Cham-e Anayeh چم عنايه
- Village
- Location within Iran
- Coordinates: 30°48′50″N 49°20′29″E
- Country: Iran
- Province: Khuzestan
- County: Ramshir
- Bakhsh: Central
- Rural District: Abdoliyeh-ye Sharqi

Population (2006)
  - Total: 408
- Time zone: UTC+3:30 (IRST)
  - Summer (DST): UTC+4:30 (IRDT)

Cham-e Anayeh (Persian: چم عنايه, also Romanized as Cham-e ‘Anāyeh, Cham ‘Anāyeh, and Cham-e ‘Enā’īyeh; also known as Cham) is a village in Abdoliyeh-ye Sharqi Rural District, in the Central District of Ramshir County, Khuzestan Province, Iran. At the 2006 census, its population was 408, in 61 families.

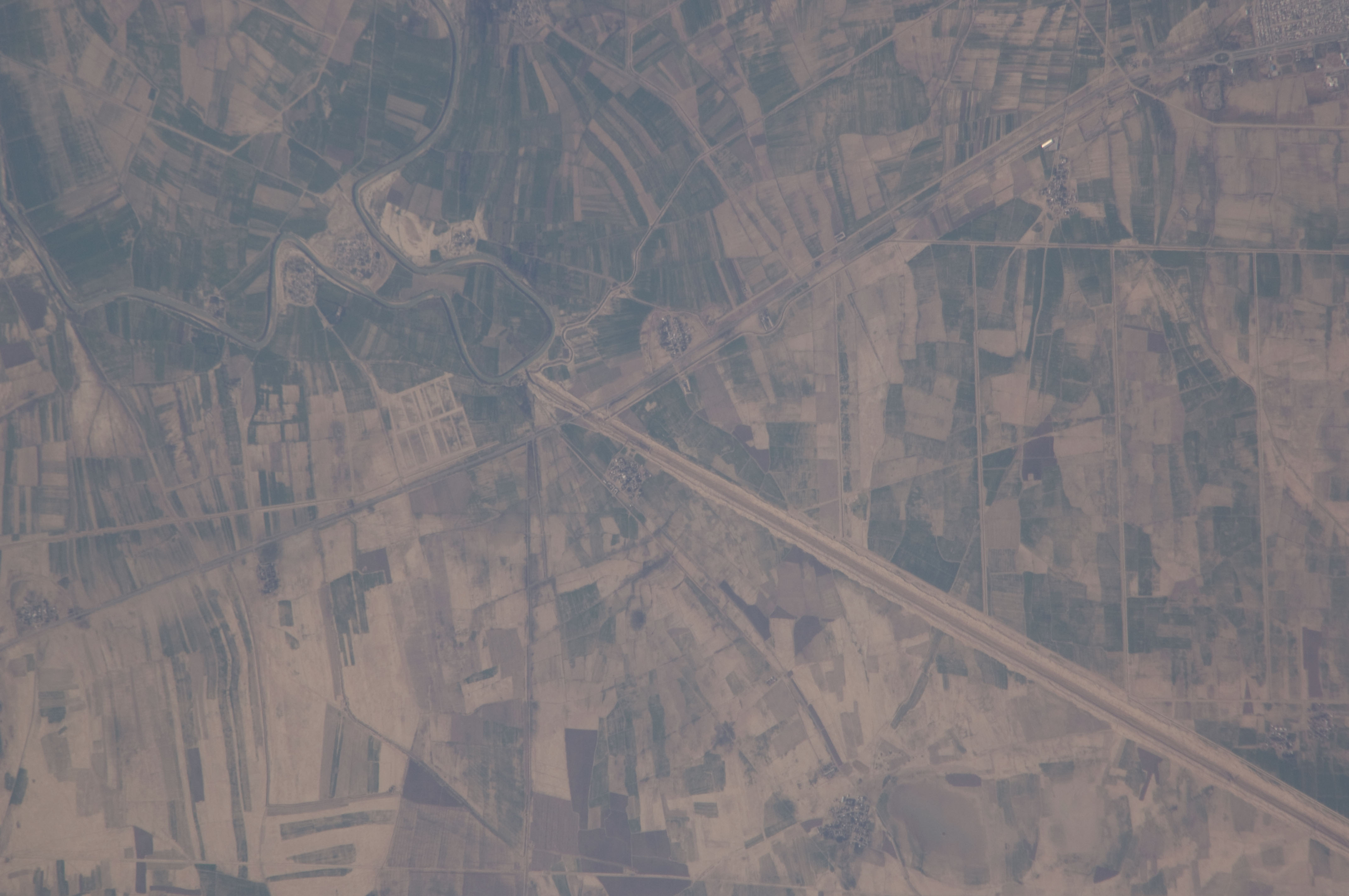
Jarahi River meander, village and landscape from above
