= Kham (instrument) =

A kham is a percussion instrument made of wood and goat skin. It is used in dances by the tribes of the Indian state of Tripura. It is roughly cylindrical and has a membrane at each end. The kham is suspended from the neck, tied to the waist and played with the hands. It is known by the same name among various Tibeto-Burman tribes including Dimasa, Tiwa, Bodo as well as Nepali tribes.
