= Cam Beck =

Stream in Cumbria, England

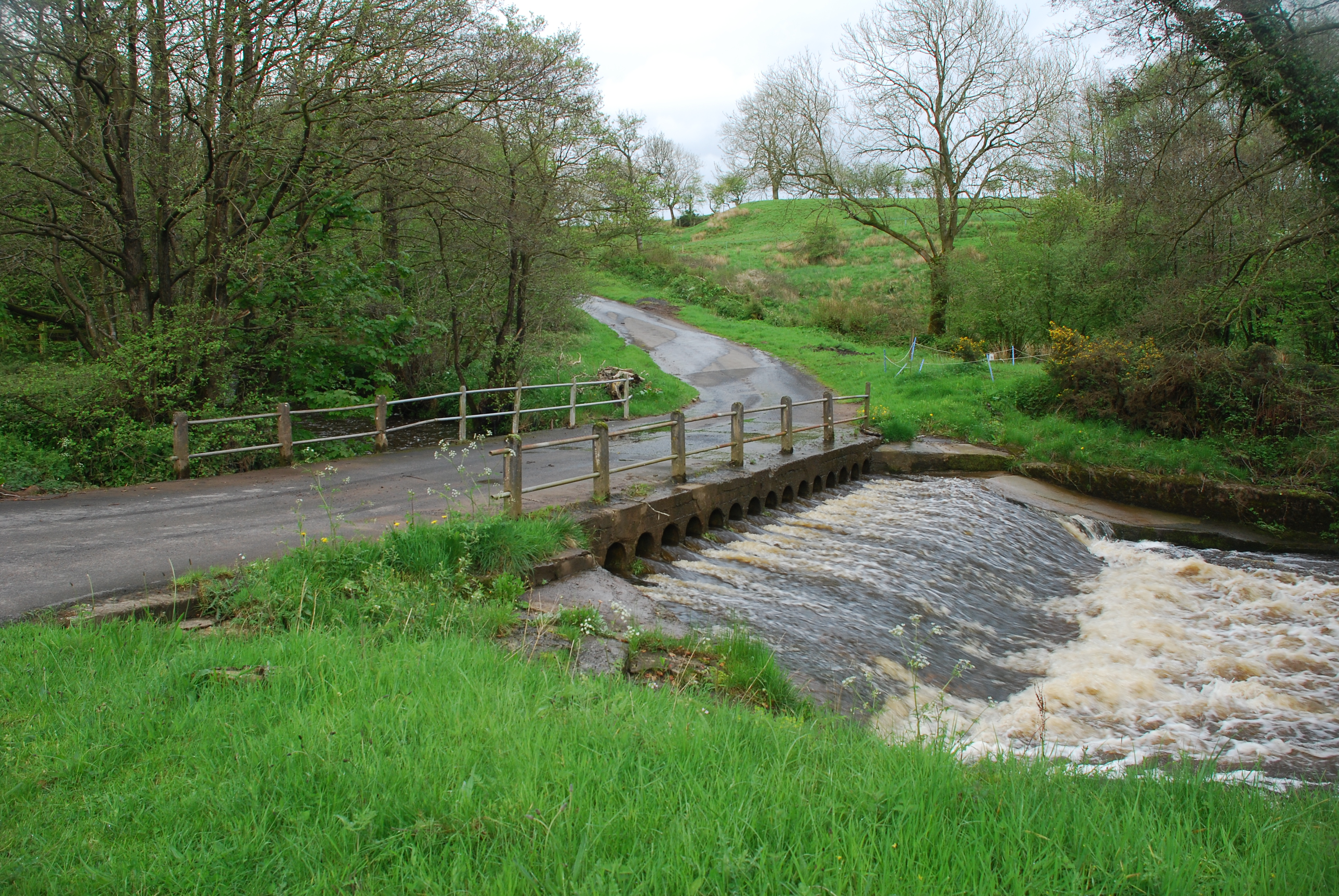
- Cam Beck at Solmain

- Location of the mouth within Cumbria

Location
- Country: England
- County: Cumbria

Physical characteristics
- Mouth
  - location: River Irthing
  - coordinates: 54.95464°N 2.766795°W
- Length: 17.66 km (10.97 mi)
- Basin size: 34.49 km^{2} (13.32 sq mi)

Cam Beck is a stream in Cumbria. It runs for 10.9 miles (17.6 km) past Kirkambeck and Cambeck Hill and into the River Irthing.

== Toponymy ==
From the British cambaco meaning "crooked stream".
