= Thiam =

- Pronunciation: Wolof: /caːm/; Chinese: /tʰi̯am/
- Language: Fula and Wolof (surname); Chinese (given name)

Origin
- Region of origin: Senegal and nearby countries (surname); Chinese communities of Southeast Asia (given name)

Other names
- Variant forms: Fula and Wolof: Tyam, Chiam, Cham; Chinese: Tiān (Mandarin); Tīm (Cantonese)

Thiam is a both a surname of West African origin and an element in Chinese given names.

== Surname ==
=== Origins and statistics ===
As a surname, Thiam is found among the Fula and Wolof people of Senegal and nearby countries, and originated from a family of goldsmiths. In the modern Fula language and Wolof language orthographies, it is spelled Caam. Thiam is one of a number of older spellings which originated during French colonial rule; others include Tyam, Chiam, and Cham. This surname is spelled Thiam in Senegal, and Cham in the Gambia. The surname originated from Toucouleur or Laobe people, and is found among Pulaar language speakers. It is not authentically Wolof, and only made its way to the Wolof through Wolof mixture.

French government statistics show 508 people with the surname Thiam born in France from 1991 to 2000, 532 from 1981 to 1990, 196 from 1971 to 1980, and 143 in earlier time periods. The 2010 United States census found 935 people with the surname Thiam, making it the 26,171st-most-common surname in the country. This represented an increase from 494 people (41,522nd-most-common) in the 2000 census. In both censuses, about nine-tenths of the bearers of the surname identified as Black, and roughly two to three percent as White or Asian.

=== Government officials and politicians ===
- Awa Thiam (born 1936), Senegalese government official in the Ministry of Women and Children
- Amadou Thiam (born 1984), Malian politician
- Augustin Thiam (born 1952), Ivorian politician, governor of the Yamoussoukro Autonomous District
- Brenda Thiam (born 1969), American politician
- Doudou Thiam (1926–1999), Senegalese diplomat and politician
- Habib Thiam (1933–2017), Senegalese politician who twice served as prime minister
- Safiatou Thiam (fl. 2000s), Senegalese public health official
- Samba Diouldé Thiam, Senegalese legislator and mathematician
- Tidjane Thiam (born 1962), Ivorian banker and economic advisor to the Ivorian government

=== Athletes ===
- Abdou Mbacke Thiam (born 1992), Senegalese footballer in the United States
- Abdoul Thiam (born 1976), German footballer
- Abdoulaye Thiam (born 1984), Senegalese sabre fencer
- Abdoulkader Thiam (born 1998), Mauritanian footballer in France
- Amy Mbacké Thiam (born 1976), Senegalese sprinter
- Assane Thiam (born 1948), Senegalese basketball player
- Brahim Thiam (born 1974), French and Malian footballer
- Chiekh Thiam (born 2001), Italian footballer of Senegalese descent
- Demba Thiam (footballer, born 1989), French footballer of Senegalese descent
- Demba Thiam (footballer, born 1998) (born 1998), Senegalese footballer in Italy
- Djibril Thiam (born 1986), Senegalese basketball player
- Ibrahima Thiam (born 1981), Senegalese footballer in Belgium
- Khaly Thiam (born 1994), Senegalese footballer in Bulgaria
- Mame Baba Thiam (born 1992), Senegalese footballer in Turkey
- Mamadou Thiam (born 1995), Senegalese footballer in England
- Mamadou Touré Thiam (born 1992), Senegalese footballer in Israel
- Mbayang Thiam (born 1982), Senegalese footballer, member of the Senegalese women's national football team
- Mohamed Thiam (born 1996), Guinean footballer
- Moustapha Thiam (born 2006), Senegalese basketball player
- Nafissatou Thiam (born 1994), Belgian athlete
- Oumoul Thiam (born 1990), Senegalese basketball player
- Pablo Thiam (born 1974), Guinean footballer
- Serigne Abdou Thiam (1995–2016), Qatari footballer of Senegalese descent

=== Other people ===
- Akon (Aliaume Damala Badara Akon Thiam; born 1973), American singer and rapper
- Abdou Rachid Thiam, Senegalese biophysicist
- Aïcha Thiam (born 1979), Belgian film director of Senegalese descent
- Jenna Thiam (born 1990), French actress
- Iba Der Thiam (born 1937), Senegalese writer and historian
- Mor Thiam (born 1941), Senegalese drummer
- Thierno Hady Boubacar Thiam (died 2017), Malian Tijaniyyah ulama

== Given name ==
Thiam can be a romanisation, based on the pronunciation in different varieties of Chinese, of multiple Chinese characters. Chinese given names frequently consist of two characters, as in the names of all of the people listed below. The character in common in all of the two-character names below means "to increase" (添); it can be spelled as Thiam based on its pronunciation in Hakka or various Southern Min dialects (including Chaoshan).

- Gan Thiam Poh (颜添宝; born 1963), Singaporean opposition politician and businessman
- Kwee Thiam Tjing (郭添清; 1900–1974), Indonesian writer
- O Thiam Chin (胡添进; born 1977), Singaporean writer
- Thio Thiam Tjong (張添聰; 1896–1969), Indonesian politician
- Tony Tan Lay Thiam (陈礼添; born 1970), Singaporean People's Action Party politician and businessman
- Yap Thiam Hien (葉添興; 1913–1989), Indonesian human rights lawyer
- Yeow Chai Thiam (姚再添 1953–2016), Malaysian medical doctor and politician

== See also ==
- Taluk Thiam, subdistrict in the Phrom Phiram District of Phitsanulok Province, Thailand
