= Gustavo Chams =

Brazilian - Canadian art director, fashion photographer and graphic designer

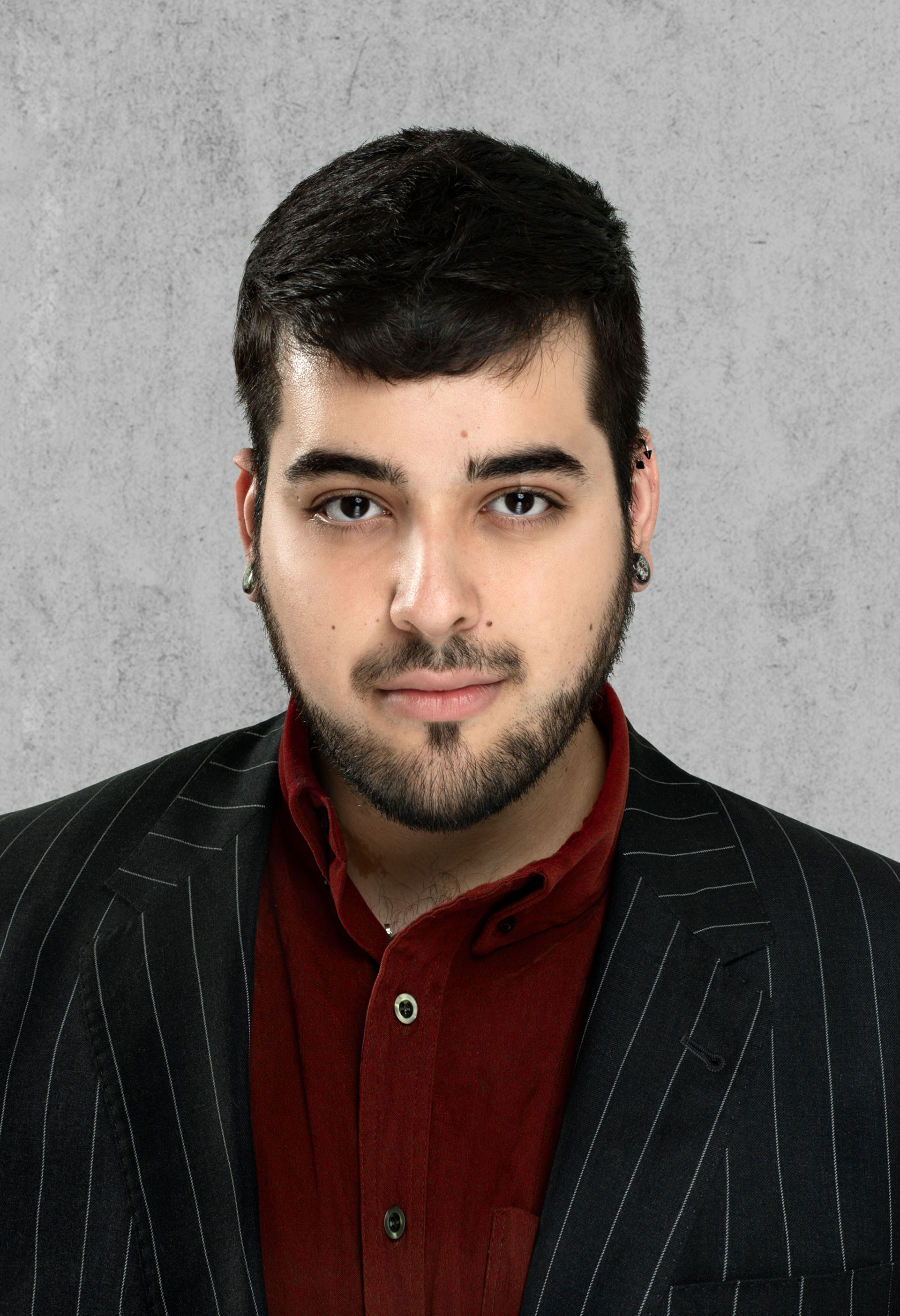
- Born: May 28, 1994 (age 32); Santo André, Brazil
- Education: Graphic Designer at Vancouver College of Art and Design
- Occupations: Fashion photographer, Designer and Visual artist
- Years active: 2009-Present
- Website: gustavochams.com

Gustavo Chams (Brazilian Portuguese: [ɡusˈtavu ˈʃɐ̃(m)s]; born May 28, 1994) is a Brazilian fashion photographer, designer and visual artist. He is known for photographing celebrities such as Gisele Bündchen, Thaila Ayala, Isabeli Fontana, Stella McCartney, Gaspard Ulliel, and Caroline Trentini; and for using one of his exhibitions to publicly criticize the 2019 Brazilian president-elect Jair Bolsonaro.

== Biography ==
Born and raised in Santo André, Brazil, Gustavo started to work at early age as a digital retoucher and graph operator in a local photography lab. A few years later, as a photographer, he signed his first fashion cover which later granted him access to work with Brazilian local celebrities.

His work received notoriety after working with celebrities such as Gisele Bündchen, Thaila Ayala, Isabeli Fontana, Stella McCartney, Gaspard Ulliel and Caroline Trentini; In 2017, Gustavo created the #BrazilianSpring project, an artistic manifesto that fought for politico-socio-cultural changes in Brazil—a spring, in reference to the 1848 revolution also known as people's spring.

In 2018, Gustavo held a solo art exhibition in Vancouver, Canada, publicly criticizing the 2019 Brazilian president elect Jair Bolsonaro. Gustavo received mixed reviews for this exhibition. The Jornal de Toronto said that Gustavo represents the voice of a social group that opposes the rise of far-right politics in Brazil, but it also questioned whether Gustavo's work had pushed it a little too far. The Jornal GGN said that Gustavo's exhibition is a clear portrait of Brasil's true reality after the 2016 parliamentary coup d'état that has led to the worst economical and social regret seen in 20 years that resulted to the rise of the far-right leader Jair Bolsonaro (PSL). Gustavo has also held other art exhibitions at different times across Brazil and beyond.

== Exhibitions ==
- Subjective Reality, Pandemonium, Liquid Amber Gallery, 2019 – Vancouver, Canada
- Meandering, inflections, and angry camels, The Fields Exhibition and Project Space, 2018 – Vancouver, Canada
- Thesis Exhibition: Brazilian Spring, Visual College of Art and Design, 2016 – Vancouver, Canada
- Total Work of Art, Markeshift Spaces, 2016 – Vancouver, Canada
- Projeto Goela, Virtual Gallery, 2015 – São Paulo, Brazil
