= Gerd-e Cham =

Gerd-e Cham گردچم
- Village
- Location within Iran
- Coordinates: 34°06′15″N 48°25′05″E
- Country: Iran
- Province: Hamadan
- County: Nahavand
- Bakhsh: Central
- Rural District: Gamasiyab

Population (2006)
  - Total: 129
- Time zone: UTC+3:30 (IRST)
  - Summer (DST): UTC+4:30 (IRDT)

Gerd-e Cham (Persian: گردچم; also known as Cham) is a village in Gamasiyab Rural District, in the Central District of Nahavand County, Hamadan Province, Iran. At the 2006 census, its population was 129, in 38 families.
