= Lado Kham =

Slovenian architect (1901–1979)

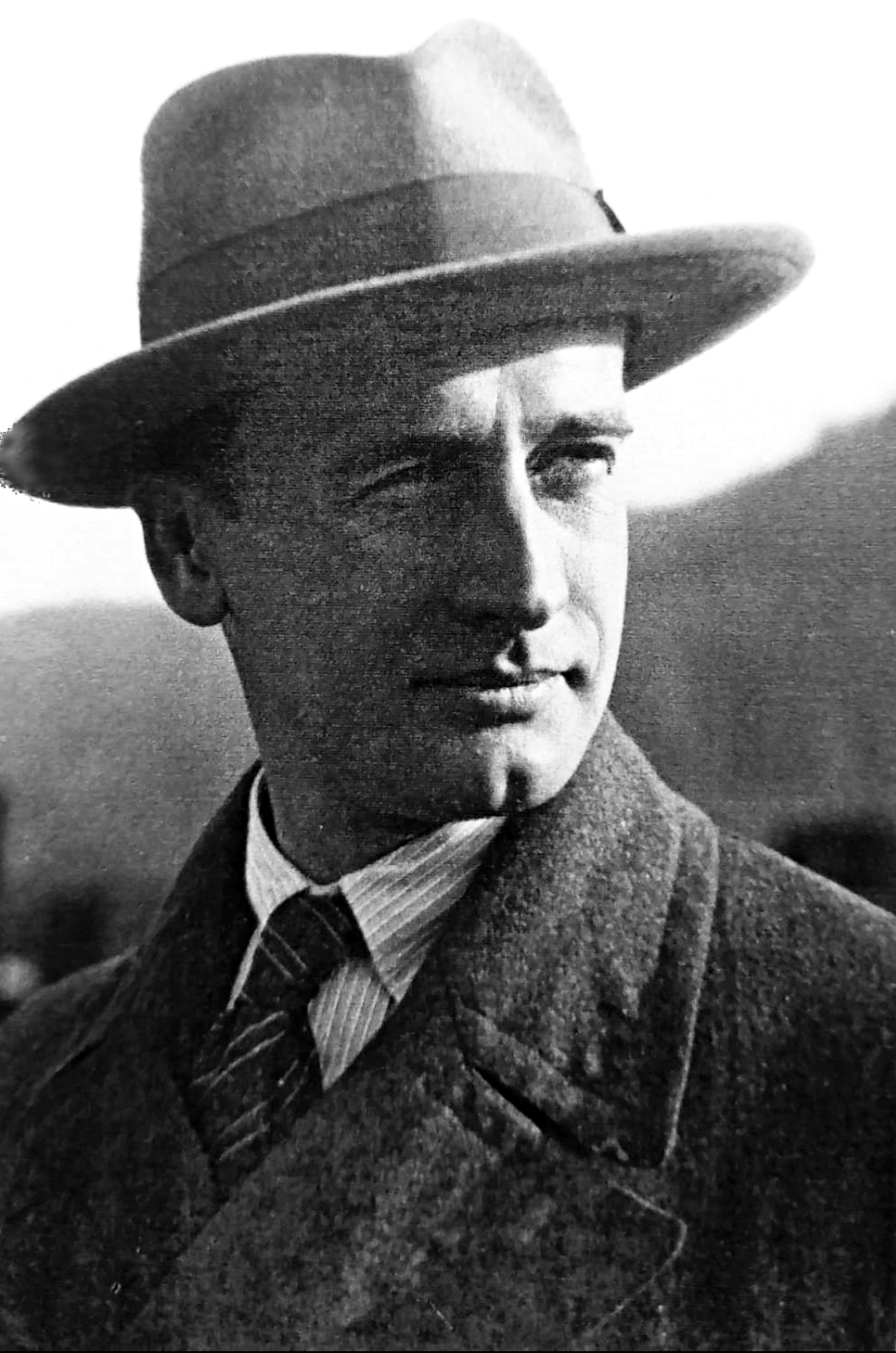
Black and White portrait of Slovene architect ing. Lado Kham, taken in a contrasted chiaroscuro manner. Lado is decisively observing over his left side, wearing a gentlemanly formal outfit with tie and hat, Family archive, Marija Kham Frangež

Lado Kham was a Slovenian architect and engineer, born on 26 May 1901, in Ljubljana.

He graduated from the Technical University of Vienna and worked as a practitioner in Austria with his mentor, Karl Holey, on the construction of municipal apartment blocks in Vienna, including the 420-apartment block in Simmeringerhof. He also led the construction of a Catholic church in the Croatian municipality of Pinkovec/Güttenbach in Germany, and designed the renovation and reconstruction of a monastic church and a new church in Deutsch Schützen, as well as two apartment buildings in the 20th district of Vienna. He participated successfully in various Austrian "concurences" and traveled extensively throughout Europe. As a technical officer at the Pension Fund in Ljubljana, he was involved in the construction of apartment blocks in Ljubljana and Celje.

In 1933, he began his own civil practice and completed numerous smaller private projects in Ljubljana, Celje, Kranj, Kamnik, Bohinj, and other regions of Slovenia, as well as in Koroska, Germany. These included holiday and cultural homes, chapels, tombstones, and the Catholic church in Hrastnik, the renovation of the evangelical church community's prayer room in Ptuj, various smaller church renovations, the renovation and reconstruction of the Kamnik spa, three three-storey houses in Ljubljana, the Hotel Bellevue in Bohinj, the Hotel Sestre Logar in the Logar Valley, the renovation of the Figovec guesthouse in Ljubljana, the renovation and expansion of the Union cinema in Ljubljana, a factory for processing animal fur in Strazisce, the Seraphic College in Ljubljana, a building with commercial premises, a dormitory, cells, a chapel, and a conference hall, as well as a commercial block in Franciskanska street.

Among the unfinished projects are several smaller and medium-sized buildings, as well as several larger multi-storey houses for Ljubljana and elsewhere, including a four-storey apartment building in Belgrade, a municipal hall in Menges, a teachers' holiday home in Omiselj, and projects for various community halls. He also designed a sanatorium for lung diseases on Golnik for the Railway hospital fund.

He held an architectural studio in the Ljubljana Skyscraper building and was involved in its construction.
