= Çamköy, Akyurt =

Çam
- Neighbourhood
- Location in Turkey Çam (Turkey Central Anatolia)
- Coordinates: 40.13°N 33.16°E
- Country: Turkey
- Province: Ankara
- District: Akyurt
- Population (2022): 74
- Time zone: UTC+3 (TRT)

Çam (also: Çamköy) is a neighbourhood in the municipality and district of Akyurt, Ankara Province, Turkey. Its population is 74 (2022).
