= Cham language =

Austronesian language of Vietnam and Cambodia

Cham
- ꨌꩌ چم
- 'Cham' in Cham script
- Pronunciation: [cam]
- Native to: Cambodia and Vietnam
- Region: Mainland Southeast Asia
- Ethnicity: Cham
- Native speakers: 490,000 (2019)
- Language family: Austronesian: Malayo-Polynesian; Malayo-Sumbawan (?); Chamic; Coastal; Cham
- Early forms: Proto-Austronesian: Proto-Malayo-Polynesian; Proto-Chamic; Old Cham
- Dialects: Western Cham; Eastern Cham
- Writing system: Cham, Jawi (Arabic), Latin

Official status
- Recognised minority language in: Vietnam; Cambodia

Language codes
- ISO 639-3: Either: cja – Western Cham cjm – Eastern Cham
- Glottolog: cham1328
- ELP: Eastern Cham
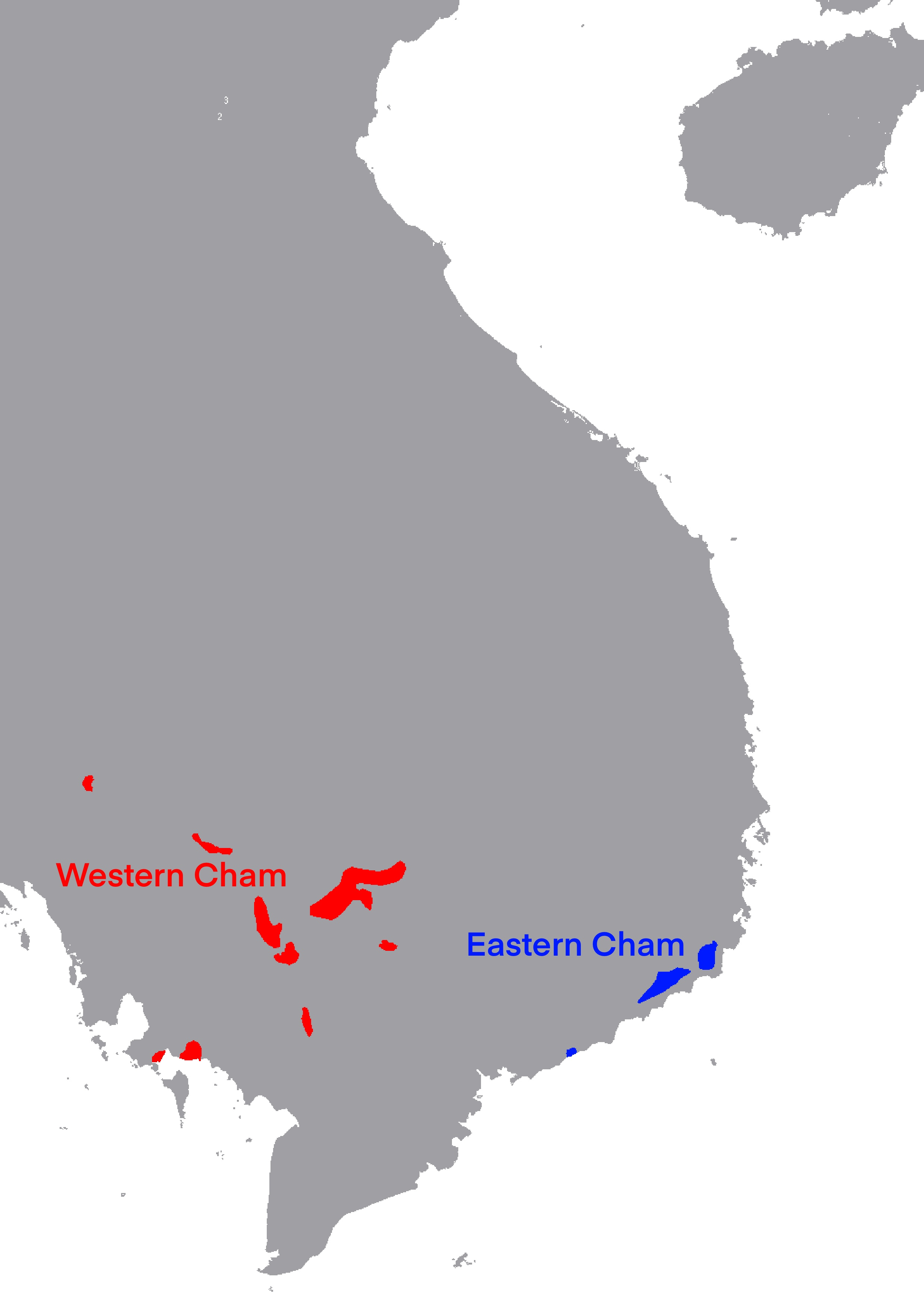

Cham (Cham: ꨌꩌ, Jawi: چم, Latin script: Cam) is a Malayo-Polynesian language of the Austronesian family, spoken by the Chams of Southeast Asia. It is spoken primarily in the territory of the former Kingdom of Champa, which spanned modern Southern Vietnam, as well as in Cambodia by a significant population which descends from refugees that fled during the decline and fall of Champa. The Western variety is spoken by 220,000 people in Cambodia and 25,000 people in Vietnam. As for the Eastern variety, there are about 73,000 speakers in Vietnam, for a total of approximately 491,448 speakers.

Cham belongs to the Chamic languages, which are spoken in parts of mainland Southeast Asia, Indonesia's Aceh Province, and on the island of Hainan. Cham is the oldest-attested Austronesian language, with the Đông Yên Châu inscription being verifiably dated to the late 4th century AD. It has several dialects, with Eastern Cham (Phan Rang Cham; ꨌꩌ ꨚꨰ, Cam pai) and Western Cham (ꨌꩌ ꨚꨭꩉ, Cam pur) being the main ones. The Cham script, derived from the ancient Indic script, is still used for ceremonial and religious purposes.

== History ==
=== Ancient roots ===
The Cham people are believed to be descendants of the Champa Kingdom, which was a powerful and influential kingdom that flourished in what is now central and southern Vietnam from around the 2nd to the 17th century. The Champa Kingdom had a distinctive culture and language that set the Cham people apart from their neighbors.

=== Champa Kingdom ===
The Champa Kingdom played a significant role in regional trade and cultural exchange, interacting with neighboring civilizations such as the Khmer Empire, the Dai Viet (Vietnamese), and others. The Cham people developed their own script, known as Cham script, which was used for inscriptions and religious texts.

=== Decline of Champa ===
The decline of the Champa Kingdom began in the 15th century, and by the 17th century, it had been absorbed by the expanding Vietnamese state. The Chams had varying levels of autonomy until 1832, when the last Champa state was finally absorbed. This period marked significant cultural and linguistic changes for the Cham people as they came under the influence of the dominant Vietnamese culture.

=== Cham diaspora ===
As a result of historical events, including wars and the annexation of Champa by Vietnam, the Cham people faced displacement. Some migrated to Cambodia, where they established communities, while others remained in Vietnam. The Cham language underwent changes and adaptations as the Cham people interacted with the cultures of their new environments.

=== Modern challenges ===
In the contemporary era, the Cham language faces challenges such as assimilation, linguistic shifts, and the influence of dominant languages in the regions where Cham communities reside. Efforts are being made to preserve and revitalize the Cham language, including cultural programs, educational initiatives, and documentation of the language.

== Phonology ==
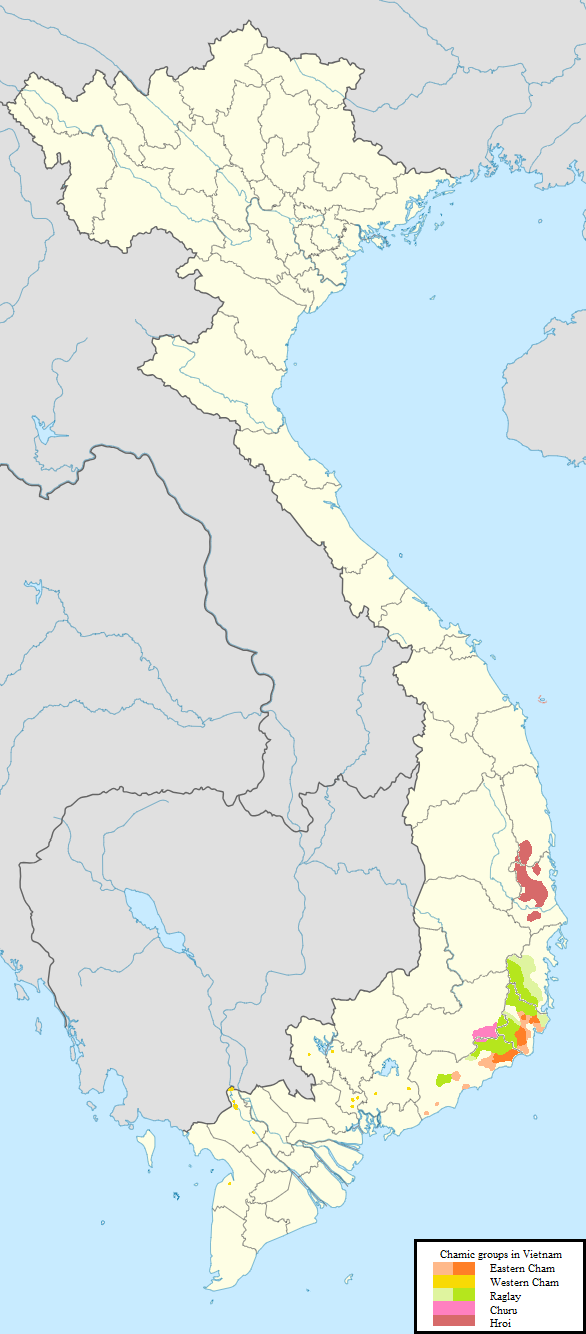
Current distribution of Cham, Hroi, Roglai and Chru speakers in Vietnam.

The Cham language dialects each have 21 consonants and 9 vowels.

=== Consonants ===
Cham consonants
		Labial	Alveolar	Palatal	Velar	Glottal
Plosive	unaspirated	p	t	c	k	ʔ
Plosive	aspirated	pʰ	tʰ	cʰ	kʰ	
Plosive	implosive	ɓ	ɗ			
Nasal		m	n	ɲ	ŋ	
Liquid			l			
Fricative			s		ɣ	h
Rhotic			r (Note: /r/ in Western Cham is heard as a velar fricative [ɣ]. In Eastern Cham, it is heard as an alveolar flap [ɾ], glide [ɹ], or trill [r].)			
Approximant			r	j	w	

=== Vowels ===
==== Monophthongs ====
Cham vowels
	Front	Central	Back
High	i	ɨ	u
Mid-high	e	ə	o
Mid-low	ɛ		ɔ
Low		a	

==== Diphthongs ====
/ia/, /iɯ/ (occurs only before /-ʔ/), /ea/, /ua/, /oa/, /au/ (occurs only before /-ʔ/), /iə/, /ɛə/, /ɔə/, /uə/.

== Grammar ==
=== Word formation ===
There are several prefixes and infixes which can be used for word derivation.

- prefix pa-: causative, sometimes giving more force to the word
  - thau (to know) → pathau (to inform)
  - blei (to buy) → pablei (to sell)
  - biér (low) → pabiér (to lower)
  - yao (like, as) → payao (to compare)
  - jâ (finished) → pajâ (well finished)
- prefix mâ-: sometimes causative, often indicates a state, possession, mutuality, reciprocity
  - jru (poison) → mâjru (to poison)
  - gru (teacher) → mâgru (to study)
  - tian (belly) → mâtian (pregnancy)
  - boh (egg, fruit) → mâboh (lay an egg, give fruit)
  - daké (horn) → mâdaké (having horns)
- prefix ta- or da-: frequentative
  - galung (to roll) → tagalung (to roll around)
  - dep (to hide oneself) → dadep (to be wont to hide oneself)
- infix -an-: noun formation
  - puec (to speak) → panuec (speech)
  - tiw (row) → taniw (oar)
  - dok (to live) → danok (house, living place)
- infix -mâ-: no specific meaning
  - payao (to compare) → pamâyao (to compare)

Reduplication is often used:

- palei, pala-palei (country)
- rambah, rambah-rambâp (misery)

=== Syntax and word order ===
Cham generally uses SVO word order, without any case marking to distinguish subject from object:

Dahlak atong nyu.
I beat he
"I beat him."

Nyu atong dahlak.
he beat I
"He beats me."

Dummy pronominal subjects are sometimes used, echoing the subject:

{Inâ hudiap dahlak} nyu atong {adei puthang nyu.}
{my wife's mother} she beat {her husband's younger sister}
"My wife's mother beats her husband's younger sister."

Composite verbs will behave as one inseparable verb, having the object come after it:

Bloh nyu {ndih di apvei} {anek lakei.}
then she {lie at fire (i.e.: give birth)} son
"Then she gave birth to a son."

Sometimes, however, the verb is placed in front of the subject:

Lék dahlak.
fall I
"I fall."

Auxiliary verbs are placed after any objects:

Nyu ba {hudiap nyu} nao.
he bring {his wife} go
"He brings his wife."

If a sentence contains more than one main verb, one of the two will have an adverbial meaning:

Nyu dep klaḥ mâtai.
he hide evade death
"He evaded death by hiding."

Adjectives come after the nouns they modify:

thang praong
house big
"a big house"

If the order is reversed, the whole will behave like a compound:

urang praong sap
person big noise
"a noisy person"

Composite sentences can be formed with the particle krung:

{tha drei athau tha drei mâyau} krung {ai nyu brei ka nyu}
{the dog and the cat} which {his brother gave him}
"the dog and the cat his brother gave him"

{nao tapak} danao krung {ai that ikan}
{to go straight} lake which {brother is fishing}
"to go straight to the lake where his brother was fishing"

It is also possible to leave out this particle, without change in meaning:

{Dahlak brei athéh nan} {ka wa dahlak} ∅ {dok dii palei Ram.}
{I give this horse} {to my uncle} who {live in the village of Ram}
"I have given this horse to my uncle, who lives in the village of Ram."

Questions are formed with the sentence-final particle rẽi:

Anek thau wakhar rei?
child know writing Q
"Can you write, child?"

Other question words are in situ:

Hau nao hatao?
you go where
"Where are you going?"

=== Nominals ===
Like many languages in Eastern Asia, Cham uses numeral classifiers to express amounts. The classifier will always come after the numeral, with the noun coming invariably before or after the classifier-numeral pair.

limâ boḥ châk
five CLF mountain
"five mountains"

palei naṃ boḥ
village six CLF
"six villages"

The above examples show the classifier boḥ, which literally means "egg" and is the most frequently used — particularly for round and voluminous objects. Other classifiers are ôrang (person) for people and deities, ḅêk for long objects, blaḥ (leaf) for flat objects, and many others.

The days of the month are counted with a similar system, with two classifiers: one (bangun) used to count days before the full moon, and the other one (ranaṃ) for days after the full moon.

harei tha bangun
day one CLF
"first day after new moon"

harei dua klaṃ
day two CLF
"second day after full moon"

Personal pronouns behave like ordinary nouns and do not show any case distinctions. There are different forms depending on the level of politeness. The first person singular, for example, is kău in formal or distant context, while it is dahlak (in Vietnam) or hulun (in Cambodia) in an ordinarily polite context. As is the case with many other languages of the region, kinship terms are often used as personal pronouns.

Comparative and superlative are expressed with the locative preposition di/dii:

tapa di {ai nyu}
big at {his brother}
"bigger than his brother"

=== Verbs ===
There are some particles that can be used to indicate tense/aspect. The future is indicated with si or thi in Vietnam, with hi or si in Cambodia. The perfect is expressed with jâ. The first one comes in front of the verb:

{Arak ni} kau si nao.
now I FUT go
"I will go now."

The second one is sentence-final:

{Sit tra} kau nao jâ.
{little more} I go PRF
"I'll be gone in a moment."

Certain verbs can function as auxiliaries to express other tenses or aspects. The verb dok ("to stay") is used for the continuous, wâk ("to return") for the repetitive aspect, and kieng ("to want") for the future tense.

The negation is formed with oh/o at either or both sides of the verb, or with di/dii in front.

The imperative is formed with the sentence-final particle bék, and the negative imperative with the preverbal juai/juei (in Vietnam and Cambodia respectively).

== Sociolinguistics ==
=== Diglossia ===
Brunelle observed two phenomena of language use among speakers of Eastern Cham: They are both diglossic and bilingual (in Cham and Vietnamese). Diglossia is the situation where two varieties of a language are used in a single language community, and oftentimes one is used on formal occasions (labelled H) and the other is more colloquial (labelled L).

=== Dialectal differences ===
Cham is divided into two primary dialects.

- Western Cham: It is spoken by the Chams in Cambodia as well as in the adjacent Vietnamese provinces of An Giang and Tây Ninh.
- Eastern Cham: It is spoken by the coastal Cham population in the Vietnamese provinces of Bình Thuận, Ninh Thuận, and Đồng Nai.

The two regions where Cham is spoken are separated both geographically and culturally. The more numerous Western Cham are predominantly Muslims (although some in Cambodia now practice Theravāda Buddhism), while the Eastern Cham practice both Hinduism and Islam. Ethnologue states that the Eastern and Western dialects are no longer mutually intelligible. The table below gives some examples of words where the two dialects differed as of the 19th century.

	Cambodia	Southern Vietnam
vowels
child	anœk	anẽk
take	tuk	tôk
not	jvẽi	jvai
sibilants
one	sa	tha
save from drowning	srong	throng
salt	sara	shara
equal	samu	hamu
final consonants
heavy	trap	trak
in front	anap	anak
lexical differences
market	pasa	darak
hate	amoḥ	limuk

Lê et al. (2014:175) lists a few Cham subgroups.

- Chăm Poông: in Thạnh Hiếu village, Phan Hiệp commune, Bắc Bình District, Bình Thuận Province. The Chăm Poông practice burial instead of cremation as the surrounding Cham do.
- Chăm Hroi (population 4,000): in Phước Vân District (Bình Định Province), Đồng Xuân District (Phú Yên Province), and Tây Sơn District (Bình Định Province)
- Chàvà Ku, a mixed Malay-Khmer people in Châu Đốc

== Writing systems ==
Cham script is a Brahmic script. The script has two varieties: Akhar Thrah (Eastern Cham) and Akhar Srak (Western Cham). The Western Cham language is written with the Arabic script (Cham Jawi) or the aforementioned Akhar Srak.

=== Example text ===
ꨕꨨꨵꩀ ꨧꨮ ꨍꨯꩆ ꨇꩈ ꨟꨮꨭ ꨕꨮꩃ ꨆꩇ ꨨꩆ ꨨꩈ ꨕꩃ ꨕꨭ ꨟꨁꨁ ꨍꨭꨢꨮꩆ ꨚꩈ ꨔꩃ ꨣꩇ ꨆꨨꨁꨃꨂ ꨝꩆ ꨔꩆ ꨇꨯꩂ ꨍꨮꨭ ꨓꨮ ꨨꩃ ꨍꨮꨭ ꨆꨯ ꨟꨶꩆ ꨕꩈ ꨌꩌ

== Dictionaries ==
The Ming dynasty Chinese Bureau of Translators produced a Chinese-Cham dictionary.

John Crawfurd's 1822 work "Journal of an Embassy to the Courts of Siam and Cochin-China" contains a wordlist of the Cham language.

== See also ==
- Old Cham
- Cham script
- Cham people
- Cham calendar
- Champa kingdom
