= Jonathan Trigell =

British author

Jonathan Trigell is a dual national British and French author. His first novel, Boy A, won the John Llewellyn Rhys Prize 2004, the Waverton Good Read Award and the inaugural World Book Day Prize in 2008.

Boy A was subsequently filmed by Cuba Pictures & Film4. Directed by John Crowley and starred Andrew Garfield, Katie Lyons and Peter Mullan. Among other prizes, Boy A won four BAFTA Awards and the Jury Prize at the Berlin Film Festival.

Jonathan completed an MA in creative writing at Manchester University, where he also studied English as an undergraduate. He spent many years in the French Alps working in the Tourism Industry and lived for a time in Chamonix, France.

Chamonix was the setting for Trigell's follow up novel Cham, familiar name of Chamonix, also acquired by Serpent's Tail publishing house. Cham was published in October 2007 and shortlisted for the Boardman Tasker Prize.

Jonathan's third work Genus - about a dystopian, genetically divided Britain - was published in July 2011. Genus was optioned for film by Matador Pictures, with Mike Carey attached to write the script. Though it is set in a near-future London, the central character of Genus is very clearly based upon Toulouse-Lautrec.

Trigell's fourth novel was published by Little, Brown in 2015 and titled The Tongues of Men or Angels. In an interview the author called it "a Biblical era Road Movie". The novel is a faction account of the process by which the Apostle Paul - heavily influenced by Mystery Religions - transformed what was a small sect of Judaism into a separate faith and the conflict this brought with Jesus's brother James the Just.

The Mail On Sunday described it as "a high-octane take on the post-Crucifixion schism that emerged between Judaism and Christianity amid the brutality of Roman rule. Written with an inventive wit and verve, this is an impressive distillation of the Christian myth in the earthy poetry of the everyday vernacular; his portrayal of the Crucifixion is particularly visceral… a bravura and original performance."

In 2022 Trigell's fifth novel Under Country was published. It is substantially set in Blackmoor, a fictional pit village in County Durham, chronicling the vicissitudes of a family and the town itself during the miner's strike and the subsequent coal mining decline and closures.

A.C. Grayling said of Under Country: "Trigell's compelling tale is written with granular precision and subtle insight; it is a moving, often excoriating story of struggle and redemption: a tale of the recent but still living past that speaks volumes about today."

James O'Brien called it, "Brilliant. A superb book."

In an interview, Trigell revealed that he has strong family connections with the former colliery town of Stanley, which shares many characteristics with the fictional Blackmoor.

Under Country contains a detailed description of the violent clash between the police and striking miners at the Battle of Orgreave.
