= 2008 British Academy Television Craft Awards =

Technical achievements in television awards ceremony

9th British Academy Television Craft Awards
- Date: 11 May 2008
- Site: The Dorchester, Mayfair, UK
- Hosted by: Claudia Winkleman

The British Academy Television Craft Awards of 2008 are presented by the British Academy of Film and Television Arts (BAFTA) and were held on 11 May 2008 at The Dorchester, Mayfair, the ceremony was hosted by Claudia Winkleman.

== Winners and nominees ==
Winners will be listed first and highlighted in boldface.

Best Director - Fiction	Best Director - Factual
**John Crowley – Boy A**; Otto Bathurst – Five Days; Marc Munden – The Mark of Cain; Adrian Shergold – Persuasion	**Jezza Neumann – Dispatches (Episode: "China’s Stolen Children (Special)")**; Joseph Bullman – The Seven Sins of England; Annabel Gillings – Earth: The Power of the Planet (Episode: "Atmosphere"); Livia Russell – Grand Designs
Best Writer	Best Breakthrough Talent
**Steven Moffat – Doctor Who (Episode: "Blink")**; Tony Marchant – The Mark of Cain; Jimmy McGovern – The Street; Heidi Thomas – Cranford	**Jezza Neumann – Dispatches (Episode: "China’s Stolen Children (Special)")**; Mark O'Rowe – Boy A; Patrick Reams – A Very British Sex Scandal; Writing Team – Skins
Best Original Television Music	Best Make-Up and Hair Design
**Capturing Mary – Adrian Johnston**; Boy A – Paddy Cunneen; Cranford – Carl Davis; Doctor Who – Murray Gold	**My Boy Jack – Morna Ferguson, Lorraine Glynn**; Cranford – Alison Elliott; Oliver Twist – Anne ‘Nosh’ Oldham; Rome – Maurizio Silvi
Best Costume Design	Best Production Design
**Oliver Twist – Amy Roberts**; Cranford – Jenny Beavan; Fanny Hill – Lucinda Wright; Miss Marie Lloyd: Queen of The Music Hall – Lucinda Wright	**Cranford – Donal Woods**; Life On Mars – Matthew Gant; Britz – Pat Campbell; My Boy Jack – Dave Arrowsmith
Best Photography and Lighting - Fiction/Entertainment	Best Photography - Factual
**Boy A – Rob Hardy**; Spooks – Damian Bromley; Joe's Palace – Danny Cohen; Skins – Nick Dance	**Tribe (Episode: "Nenets") – Wayne Derrick**; Natural World (Episode: "Wye – Voices From The Valley") – Charlie Hamilton-James, James McPherson; Dispatches (Episode: "China’s Stolen Children (Special)") – Jezza Neumann; The Seven Sins of England – Mark Wolf
Best Editing - Fiction/Entertainment	Best Editing - Factual
**Boy A – Lucia Zucchetti**; Five Days – Sarah Brewerton; The Mighty Boosh – Mark Everson; Cranford – Frances Parker	**Parallel Worlds, Parallel Lives – Folko Boermans**; The Apprentice – Tris Harris; The Seven Sins of England – Ollie Huddlestone, Michael Harrowes; Dispatches (Episode: "China’s Stolen Children (Special)") – Jezza Neumann, Brian Woods, Reg Clarke
Best Sound - Fiction/Entertainment	Best Sound - Factual
**Cranford – Paul Hamblin, Graham Headicar, Andre Schmidt, Peter Brill**; Spooks – Rudi Buckle, James Feltham, Darren Banks, Ben Norrington; Life On Mars – Dave Sansom, James Feltham, Darren Banks, Alex Sawyer; Doctor Who – Sound Team	**War Oratorio – Paul Paragon, Mike Hatch, Ben Baird**; Michael Palin's New Europe – George Foulgham, John Pritchard; Trawlermen: Pick of The Catch – George Foulgham, Lisa McMahon; Seven Ages of Rock – Sound Team
Best Visual Effects	Best Titles
**Fight for Life – Jellyfish Pictures**; Primeval – Matt Fox, Christian Manz, James Farrington; Doctor Who (Episode: "Voyage of the Damned") – The Mill; Rome – VFX Team	**Skins – Tal Rosner**; Primeval – Peter Anderson; Rugby Union – Adam Wells, Christopher Wilcock, Mark Hyde; Life On Mars – Why Not Associates
Best Interactive Innovation - Content	Best Interactive Innovation - Service/Platform
**Spooks Interactive – Nathan Mayfield, Thom Saunders, Anthony Mullins**; KateModern – Miles Beckett, Luke Hyams, Gavin Rowe; Emmerdale Online Channel – Anthony Mullins, Nathan Mayfield, Thom Saunders; Skins – Peter Spiers, Lindsay Nuttall	**BBC iPlayer – Tony Ageh, Anthony Rose, Ian Hunter**; Bebo Open Media Platform – Development Team; KateModern – Development Team
Best Interactive Creative Contribution
**Skins – Chloe Moss, Holly Hughes, Max Gogarty**; BBC Archives – Grant Bremner, Julie Rowbotham, Kate Wheeler; Doctor Who Comic Maker – Tom Collins; Big Art Mob – Alfie Dennen, Adam Gee, Clifford Singer

=== Special awards ===
- **David Croft**
- **Jimmy Perry**

== See also ==
- 2008 British Academy Television Awards
