= Boy A =

2004 novel by Jonathan Trigell

- First edition
- Author: Jonathan Trigell
- Language: English
- Publisher: Serpent's Tail
- Publication date: 2004
- Publication place: United Kingdom
- Pages: 248
- Awards: John Llewellyn Rhys Prize; Waverton Good Read Award
- ISBN: 978-1-84668-662-7
- OCLC: 236175543

Boy A is the debut novel by Jonathan Trigell, which was first published in 2004.

== Premise ==
The book is the story of a child criminal released into society as an adult, taking its title from the court practice of concealing the identity of child defendants and child killers.

== Success ==
Published by Serpent's Tail in English-speaking countries, the novel was translated into French as Jeux d'Enfants and published by Gallimard; it has also been translated into Chinese, Russian, Dutch and Spanish. It won the 2004 John Llewellyn Rhys Prize and the 2005 Waverton Good Read Award. On World Book Day (UK) 2008, Boy A was voted the most discussion-worthy novel by a living writer in the Spread The Word poll.

== Television adaptation ==
The book was adapted into a BAFTA Award-winning TV movie that was released theatrically in some areas. The film was made by Cuba Pictures and written by Mark O'Rowe, and premiered at the 2007 Toronto International Film Festival. It was directed by John Crowley and starred Andrew Garfield (who won the 2008 Best Actor BAFTA TV Award for his performance), Peter Mullan and Katie Lyons. The film was released cinematically in the US by the Weinstein Company on 23 July 2008.

== Similarities with the James Bulger case ==
The book and film share several similarities with the notorious murder of James Bulger at the hands of two ten-year-old boys in 1993. Jonathan Trigell has said that the character of Jack/Eric is based on a childhood friend of his who had struggled with life outside prison after serving a lengthy sentence, although not for murder. Trigell has also said the book was influenced by the media frenzy around the Bulger murderer's release.
