= List of awards and nominations received by Andrew Garfield =

Andrew Garfield awards and nominations
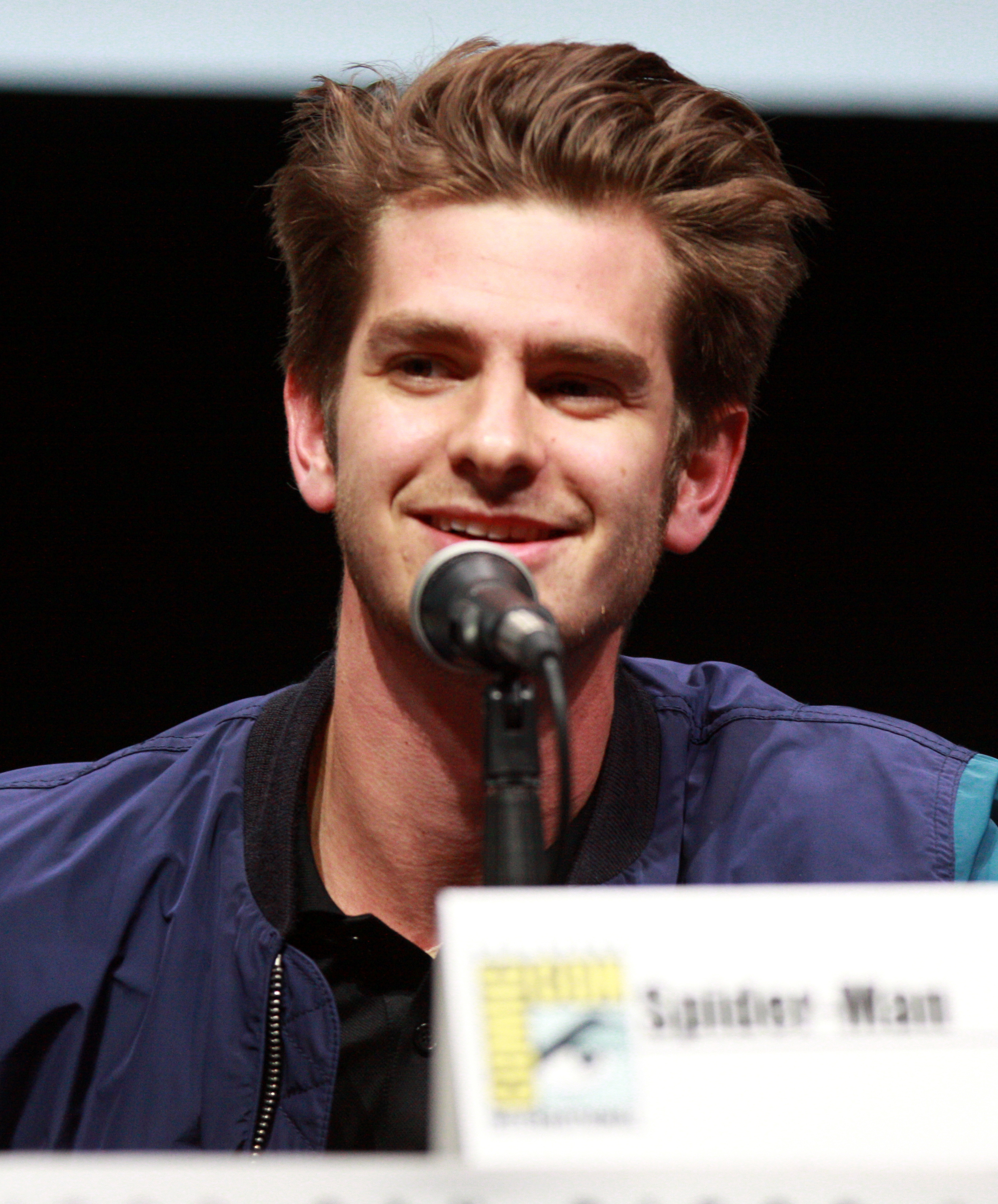
- Garfield at the 2013 San Diego Comic-Con
Awards and nominations
Award	Wins	Nominations
Academy Awards	0	2
Actor Awards	0	3
BAFTA Awards	1	4
Critics' Choice	2	7
Emmy Awards	0	1
Golden Globes	1	4
Olivier Awards	0	1
Tony Awards	1	2

Totals (Note: Certain award groups do not simply award one winner. They acknowledge several different recipients, have runners-up, and have third place. Since this is a specific recognition and is different from losing an award, runner-up mentions are considered wins in this award tally. For simplification and to avoid errors, each award in this list has been presumed to have had a prior nomination.)
- Wins: 64
- Nominations: 177

Andrew Garfield is an English and American actor known for his performances on stage and screen. Over his career he has received a British Academy Television Award, a Golden Globe Award and a Tony Award as well as nominations for two Academy Awards, three British Academy Film Awards, a Laurence Olivier Award, a Primetime Emmy Award, and three Actor Awards.

Garfield received acclaim for his role as Eduardo Saverin in the drama The Social Network (2010), earning nominations for the BAFTA Award for Best Actor in a Supporting Role and the Golden Globe Award for Best Supporting Actor – Motion Picture. He went on to receive nominations for two Academy Awards for Best Actor for his portrayals of Desmond Doss in the war film Hacksaw Ridge (2016) and Jonathan Larson in the musical Tick, Tick... Boom! (2021). He won the Golden Globe Award for Best Actor in a Motion Picture – Musical or Comedy for the latter.

For his roles on television he won the British Academy Television Award for Best Actor for his role as former prison inmate in the British Channel 4 drama Boy A (2008). He was nominated for the Primetime Emmy Award for Outstanding Lead Actor in a Limited or Anthology Series or Movie for his role as police Detective in the FX on Hulu true crime drama miniseries Under the Banner of Heaven (2022).

On stage, Garfield made his Broadway debut portraying Biff Loman in the 2012 revival of the Arthur Miller tragic American play Death of a Salesman for which he was nominated for the Tony Award for Best Featured Actor in a Play. He played Prior Walter in the revival of Tony Kushner's epic play Angels in America on the West End in 2017 receiving a nomination for the Laurence Olivier Award for Best Actor. He returned to Broadway in 2018, where he reprised the role and won the Tony Award for Best Actor in a Play.

== Major associations ==
=== Academy Awards ===
Year	Category	Nominated work	Result	Ref.
2017	Best Actor	Hacksaw Ridge	Nominated	
2022	Best Actor	Tick, Tick... Boom!	Nominated	

=== Actor Awards ===
Year	Category	Nominated work	Result	Ref.
2011	Outstanding Cast in a Motion Picture	The Social Network	Nominated	
2017	Outstanding Male Actor in a Leading Role	Hacksaw Ridge	Nominated	
2022	Outstanding Male Actor in a Leading Role	Tick, Tick... Boom!	Nominated	

=== BAFTA Awards ===
Year	Category	Nominated work	Result	Ref.
British Academy Film Awards
2011	Rising Star Award	—N/a	Nominated	
2011	Best Actor in a Supporting Role	The Social Network	Nominated	
2017	Best Actor in a Leading Role	Hacksaw Ridge	Nominated	
British Academy Television Awards
2008	Best Actor	Boy A	Won	

=== Critics' Choice Awards ===
Year	Category	Nominated work	Result	Ref.
Critics' Choice Movie Awards
2011	Best Supporting Actor	The Social Network	Nominated	
2011	Best Acting Ensemble	The Social Network	Nominated	
2017	Best Actor in an Action Movie	Hacksaw Ridge	Won	
2017	Best Actor	Hacksaw Ridge	Nominated	
2022	Best Actor	Tick, Tick...Boom!	Nominated	
Critics' Choice Television Awards
2023	Best Actor in a Movie/Miniseries	Under the Banner of Heaven	Nominated	
Critics' Choice Super Awards
2022	Best Actor in a Superhero Movie	Spider-Man: No Way Home	Won	

=== Emmy Awards ===
Year	Category	Nominated work	Result	Ref.
Primetime Emmy Awards
2022	Outstanding Lead Actor in a Limited Series or Movie	Under the Banner of Heaven	Nominated	

=== Golden Globe Awards ===
Year	Category	Nominated work	Result	Ref.
2011	Best Supporting Actor – Motion Picture	The Social Network	Nominated	
2017	Best Actor in a Motion Picture – Drama	Hacksaw Ridge	Nominated	
2022	Best Actor in a Motion Picture – Musical or Comedy	Tick, Tick... Boom!	Won	
2023	Best Actor in a Miniseries or Motion Picture – Television	Under the Banner of Heaven	Nominated	

=== Laurence Olivier Awards ===
Year	Category	Nominated work	Result	Ref.
2018	Best Actor in a Play	Angels in America	Nominated	

=== Tony Awards ===
Year	Category	Nominated work	Result	Ref.
2012	Best Featured Actor in a Play	Death of a Salesman	Nominated	
2018	Best Actor in a Play	Angels in America	Won	

== Miscellaneous awards ==
Organizations	Year (Note: Indicates the year of the ceremony.)	Category	Work	Result	Ref.
AACTA Awards	2016	Best Actor	Hacksaw Ridge	Won	
AACTA Awards	2016	Best International Actor	Hacksaw Ridge	Nominated	
AACTA Awards	2021	Best International Actor	Tick, Tick... Boom!	Nominated	
Awards Circuit Community Awards	2010	Best Performance by an Actor in a Supporting Role	The Social Network	Runner-up	
Awards Circuit Community Awards	2016	Best Actor in a Leading Role	Hacksaw Ridge	Nominated	
AFCA Film & Writing Awards	2017	Best Actor	Hacksaw Ridge	Nominated	
British Independent Film Awards	2010	Best Supporting Actor	Never Let Me Go	Nominated	
Capri Hollywood International Film Festival	2016	Best Actor	Hacksaw Ridge	Won	
Capri Hollywood International Film Festival	2021	Capri King of Comedy Award	Tick, Tick... Boom!	Won	
CinEuphoria Awards	2010	Best Actor - International Competition	Boy A	Won	
Evening Standard British Film Awards	2010	Best Actor	Never Let Me Go and The Social Network	Won	
The Film Art Awards	2010	Best Supporting Actor	The Social Network	Nominated	
The Film Art Awards	2016	Best Actor	Hacksaw Ridge	Won	
Golden Schmoes Awards	2010	Best Supporting Actor of the Year	The Social Network	Nominated	
Golden Schmoes Awards	2010	Breakthrough Performance of the Year	The Social Network	Nominated	
Golden Schmoes Awards	2016	Best Actor of the Year	Hacksaw Ridge	Nominated	
Golden Schmoes Awards	2021	Best Actor of the Year	Tick, Tick... Boom!	Runner-up	
Golden Schmoes Awards	2021	Best Supporting Actor of the Year	Spider-Man: No Way Home	Runner-up	
Gotham Awards	2026	Outstanding Supporting Performance	Artificial	Pending	
Hollywood Film Festival	2010	Ensemble of the Year	The Social Network	Won	
Hollywood Film Festival	2010	Best Breakthrough Performance	Never Let Me Go and The Social Network	Won	
IGN Summer Movie Awards	2016	Best Movie Actor - People's Choice Award	Hacksaw Ridge	Won	
IGN Summer Movie Awards	2016	Best Movie Actor	Hacksaw Ridge	Nominated	
International Cinephile Society Awards	2017	Best Actor	Silence	Nominated	
International Online Cinema Awards	2011	Best Supporting Actor	The Social Network	Nominated	
Irish Film and Television Award	2017	Best International Actor	Hacksaw Ridge	Nominated	
Italian Online Movie Awards	2011	Best Supporting Actor	The Social Network	Nominated	
MTV Movie & TV Awards	2011	Best Line from a Movie (with Justin Timberlake)	The Social Network	Nominated	
MTV Movie & TV Awards	2011	Best Breakout Star	The Social Network	Nominated	
MTV Movie & TV Awards	2015	Best Kiss (with Emma Stone)	The Amazing Spider-Man 2	Nominated	
MTV Movie & TV Awards	2022	Best Team (with Tom Holland and Tobey Maguire)	Spider-Man: No Way Home	Nominated	
MTV Movie & TV Awards	2022	Best Musical Moment (with Vanessa Hudgens)	"Therapy" for Tick, Tick... Boom!	Nominated	
National Movie Awards	2011	One to Watch: Brits Going Global	The Social Network	Nominated	
Nickelodeon Kids' Choice Awards	2013	Favorite Male Action Star	The Amazing Spider-Man	Nominated	
Nickelodeon Kids' Choice Awards	2013	Favorite Male Butt Kicker	The Amazing Spider-Man	Nominated	
Nickelodeon Kids' Choice Awards	2015	Favorite Male Action Star	The Amazing Spider-Man 2	Nominated	
Online Film & Television Association	2011	Best Breakthrough Performance - Male	The Social Network	Won	
Online Film & Television Association	2011	Best Supporting Actor	The Social Network	Nominated	
Online Film & Television Association	2017	Best Actor	Hacksaw Ridge	Nominated	
Online Film & Television Association	2022	Best Actor	Tick, Tick...Boom!	Runner-up	
Palm Springs International Film Festival	2011	Ensemble Cast Award	The Social Network	Won	
Palm Springs International Film Festival	2017	Spotlight Award	Hacksaw Ridge	Won	
Palm Springs International Film Festival	2021	Desert Palm Achievement Award	Tick, Tick... Boom!	Won	
People's Choice Awards	2012	Favorite Movie Superhero	The Amazing Spider-Man	Nominated	
People's Choice Awards	2012	Favorite On-Screen Chemistry (with Emma Stone)	The Amazing Spider-Man	Nominated	
People's Choice Awards	2014	Favorite Movie Duo (with Emma Stone)	The Amazing Spider-Man 2	Nominated	
Royal Television Society	2008	Best Actor - Male	Boy A	Nominated	
Santa Barbara International Film Festival	2011	Virtuoso Award	The Social Network	Won	
Santa Barbara International Film Festival	2026	Maltin Modern Master Award	For enriching culture through accomplishments in the motion picture industry	Honored	
Satellite Awards	2010	Best Supporting Actor - Motion Picture	The Social Network	Nominated	
Satellite Awards	2016	Best Actor – Motion Picture	Hacksaw Ridge	Won	
Satellite Awards	2021	Best Actor – Motion Picture Musical or Comedy	Tick, Tick... Boom!	Won	
Satellite Awards	2022	Best Actor – Miniseries or Television Film	Under the Banner of Heaven	Nominated	
Saturn Awards	2010	Best Supporting Actor	Never Let Me Go	Won	
Scream Awards	2010	Breakout Performance - Male	The Imaginarium of Doctor Parnassus	Nominated	
Teen Choice Awards	2010	Choice Movie: Male Scene Stealer	The Social Network	Nominated	
Teen Choice Awards	2012	Choice Summer Movie Star: Male	The Amazing Spider-Man	Nominated	
Teen Choice Awards	2014	Choice Liplock (with Emma Stone)	The Amazing Spider-Man 2	Nominated	
Teen Choice Awards	2014	Choice Movie Actor - Sci-Fi/Fantasy	The Amazing Spider-Man 2	Nominated	
Teen Choice Awards	2017	Choice Drama Movie Actor	Hacksaw Ridge	Nominated	
Young Hollywood Awards	2014	Super Superhero	The Amazing Spider-Man 2	Nominated	
Young Hollywood Awards	2014	Fan Favorite Actor - Male	The Amazing Spider-Man 2	Nominated	
Young Hollywood Awards	2014	Best On-Screen Couple (with Emma Stone)	The Amazing Spider-Man 2	Nominated	
Zurich Film Festival	2017	Golden Eye Award	Breathe	Won	

== Theatre awards ==
Organizations	Year (Note: Indicates the year of the ceremony.)	Category	Work	Result	Ref.
Broadway.com Audience Choice Awards	2012	Favorite Actor in a Play	Death of Salesman	Nominated	
Broadway.com Audience Choice Awards	2012	Favorite Breakthrough Performance	Death of Salesman	Won	
Broadway.com Audience Choice Awards	2012	Favorite Onstage Pair (with Philip Seymour Hoffman)	Death of Salesman	Nominated	
Broadway.com Audience Choice Awards	2018	Favorite Leading Actor in a Play	Angels in America	Won	
Critics' Circle Theatre Awards	2006	Most Promising Newcomer	Citizenship and The Overwhelming	Won	
Drama Desk Awards	2018	Outstanding Actor in a Play	Angels in America	Won	
Drama League Awards	2012	Distinguished Performance	Death of a Salesman	Nominated	
Drama League Awards	2018	Distinguished Performance	Angels in America	Nominated	
Evening Standard Theatre Awards	2006	Outstanding Newcomer	Beautiful Thing; Burn/Chatroom; Citizenship; The Overwhelming	Won	
Evening Standard Theatre Awards	2017	Best Actor	Angels in America	Won	
Outer Critics Circle Awards	2012	Best Featured Actor in a Play	Death of a Salesman	Nominated	
Outer Critics Circle Awards	2018	Best Actor in a Play	Angels in America	Won	
Theatregoers' Choice Awards	2017	Best Actor in a Play	Angels in America	Nominated	
Theatre Fans' Choice Awards	2018	Best Leading Actor in A Play	Angels in America	Won	
WhatsOnStage Awards	2018	Best Actor in a Play	Angels in America	Nominated	

== Critics associations ==
Year	Association	Category	Nominated work	Result	Ref.
2010	London Film Critics' Circle	British Actor of the Year	Never Let Me Go	Nominated	
2010	Boston Society of Film Critics	Best Supporting Actor	The Social Network	Runner-up	
2010	Chicago Film Critics Association	Best Supporting Actor	The Social Network	Nominated	
2010	Detroit Film Critics Society	Breakthrough Performance	The Social Network	Nominated	
2010	Detroit Film Critics Society	Best Supporting Actor	The Social Network	Nominated	
2010	Houston Film Critics Society	Best Supporting Actor	The Social Network	Nominated	
2010	Indiewire Critics' Poll	Best Supporting Performance	The Social Network	Nominated	
2010	Iowa Film Critics Awards	Best Supporting Actor	The Social Network	Nominated	
2010	Las Vegas Film Critics Society Awards	Best Supporting Actor	The Social Network	Nominated	
2010	Online Film Critics Society	Best Supporting Actor	The Social Network	Nominated	
2010	Phoenix Film Critics Society Awards	Best Supporting Actor	The Social Network	Nominated	
2010	Phoenix Film Critics Society Awards	Best Ensemble Acting	The Social Network	Won	
2010	San Diego Film Critics Society Awards	Best Ensemble Performance	The Social Network	Nominated	
2010	Utah Film Critics Association Awards	Best Supporting Actor	The Social Network	Nominated	
2010	Village Voice Film Poll	Best Supporting Actor	The Social Network	Nominated	
2010	Washington D.C. Area Film Critics Association	Best Acting Ensemble	The Social Network	Nominated	
2010	Washington D.C. Area Film Critics Association	Best Supporting Actor	The Social Network	Nominated	
2011	Central Ohio Film Critics Association	Best Ensemble	The Social Network	Nominated	
2011	Central Ohio Film Critics Association	Best Supporting Actor	The Social Network	Nominated	
2011	Gay and Lesbian Entertainment Critics Association	Rising Star of the Year	The Social Network	Nominated	
2011	London Film Critics' Circle	British Actor in Supporting Role	The Social Network	Won	
2015	Women Film Critics Circle Awards	Best Actor	99 Homes	Nominated	
2016	Village Voice Film Poll	Best Actor	Silence	Nominated	
2016	Denver Film Critics Society	Best Actor	Hacksaw Ridge	Nominated	
2016	Detroit Film Critics Society	Best Actor	Hacksaw Ridge	Nominated	
2016	Houston Film Critics Society	Best Actor	Hacksaw Ridge	Nominated	
2016	London Film Critics' Circle	Actor of the Year	Hacksaw Ridge	Nominated	
2016	London Film Critics' Circle	British/Irish Actor of the Year	Hacksaw Ridge	Won	
2016	Phoenix Film Critics Society Awards	Best Actor	Hacksaw Ridge	Nominated	
2016	Phoenix Critics Circle	Best Actor	Hacksaw Ridge	Nominated	
2016	Washington D.C. Area Film Critics Association	Best Actor	Hacksaw Ridge	Nominated	
2017	Film Critics Circle of Australia Awards	Best Actor	Hacksaw Ridge	Nominated	
2017	Georgia Film Critics Association	Best Actor	Hacksaw Ridge	Nominated	
2017	Hawaii Film Critics Society	Best Actor	Hacksaw Ridge	Nominated	
2017	North Texas Film Critics Association	Best Actor	Hacksaw Ridge	Nominated	
2021	Sunset Film Critics Circle	Best Actor	Tick, Tick... Boom!	Won	
2021	Hollywood Critics Association	Best Actor	Tick, Tick... Boom!	Won	
2021	Detroit Film Critics Society	Best Actor	Tick, Tick... Boom!	Nominated	
2021	Washington D.C. Area Film Critics Association	Best Actor	Tick, Tick... Boom!	Won	
2021	Atlanta Film Critics Circle Awards	Best Actor	Tick, Tick... Boom!	Nominated	
2021	Discussingfilm Critic Awards	Best Actor	Tick, Tick... Boom!	Won	
2021	Alliance of Women Film Journalists	Best Actor	Tick, Tick... Boom!	Nominated	
2021	Las Vegas Film Critics Society Awards	Best Actor	Tick, Tick... Boom!	Nominated	
2021	St. Louis Film Critics Association Awards	Best Actor	Tick, Tick... Boom!	Runner-up	
2021	Chicago Film Critics Association	Best Actor	Tick, Tick... Boom!	Nominated	
2021	Portland Critics Association	Best Actor	Tick, Tick... Boom!	Nominated	
2021	International Film Society Critics	Best Actor	Tick, Tick... Boom!	Won	
2021	Phoenix Critics Circle	Best Actor	Tick, Tick... Boom!	Nominated	
2021	Georgia Film Critics Association	Best Actor	Tick, Tick... Boom!	Nominated	
2021	Women Film Critics Circle Awards	Best Actor	Tick, Tick... Boom!	Nominated	
2021	Florida Film Critics Circle	Best Actor	Tick, Tick... Boom!	Nominated	
2021	London Film Critics' Circle	Actor of the Year	Tick, Tick... Boom!	Nominated	
2021	London Film Critics' Circle	British/Irish Actor of the Year	Tick, Tick... Boom!	Won	
2021	Online Association of Female Film Critics	Best Actor	Tick, Tick... Boom!	Won	
2021	Utah Film Critics Association	Best Lead Performance, Male	Tick, Tick... Boom!	Runner-up	
2021	Indiana Film Journalists Association	Best Actor	Tick, Tick... Boom!	Nominated	
2021	Dallas–Fort Worth Film Critics Association	Best Actor	Tick, Tick... Boom!	3rd place	
2021	Young Filmmakers Association of America Awards	Best Comedy Or Musical Actor	Tick, Tick... Boom!	Won	
2022	Greater Western New York Film Critics Association	Best Actor	Tick, Tick... Boom!	Nominated	
2022	Austin Film Critics Association	Best Actor	Tick, Tick... Boom!	Nominated	
2022	North Carolina Film Critics Association	Best Actor	Tick, Tick... Boom!	Nominated	
2022	Columbus Film Critics Association	Best Actor	Tick, Tick... Boom!	Nominated	
2022	Columbus Film Critics Association	Actor of the Year	Tick, Tick... Boom!	Runner-up	
2022	Oklahoma Film Critics Circle	Best Actor	Tick, Tick... Boom!	Runner-up	
2022	Oklahoma Film Critics Circle	Best Body of Work	Tick, Tick... Boom!	Runner-up	
2022	San Diego Film Critics Society	Best Actor	Tick, Tick... Boom!	Runner-up	
2022	Toronto Film Critics Association	Best Actor	Tick, Tick... Boom!	Runner-up	
2022	Kansas City Film Critics Circle	Best Actor	Tick, Tick... Boom!	Runner-up	
2022	Seattle Film Critics Society	Best Actor	Tick, Tick... Boom!	Nominated	
2022	San Francisco Bay Area Film Critics Circle Awards	Best Actor	Tick, Tick... Boom!	Nominated	
2022	Hawaii Film Critics Society	Best Actor	Tick, Tick... Boom!	Nominated	
2022	Chicago Independent Film Critics Circle	Best Actor	Tick, Tick... Boom!	Won	
2022	Critics Association of Central Florida	Best Actor	Tick, Tick... Boom!	Won	
2022	Iowa Film Critics Awards	Best Actor	Tick, Tick... Boom!	Won	
2022	North Dakota Film Society	Best Actor	Tick, Tick... Boom!	Nominated	
2022	Music City Film Critics Association	Best Actor	Tick, Tick... Boom!	Nominated	
2022	Online Film Critics Society	Best Actor	Tick, Tick... Boom!	Nominated	
2022	North American Film Critic Association	Best Actor	Tick, Tick... Boom!	Won	
2022	Vancouver Film Critics Circle	Best Actor	Tick, Tick... Boom!	Won	
2022	Latino Entertainment Journalists Association	Best Actor	Tick, Tick... Boom!	Won	
2022	Dorian Awards	Best Actor	Tick, Tick... Boom!	Nominated	
2022	Houston Film Critics Society Awards	Best Actor	Tick, Tick... Boom!	Nominated	
2022	Houston Film Critics Society Awards	Best Supporting Actor	The Eyes of Tammy Faye	Nominated	
2022	Hollywood Critics Association	Best Actor in a Streaming Limited or Anthology Series	Under the Banner of Heaven	Nominated	

== See also ==
- List of British actors
- List of Academy Award winners and nominees from Great Britain
- List of actors with Academy Award nominations
- List of actors with two or more Academy Award nominations in acting categories
- List of Golden Globe winners
