= Rob Hardy (cinematographer) =

British cinematographer

- Born: Robert Hardy; Barking, London, England
- Education: Newport Film School
- Years active: 1995–Present

Rob Hardy B.S.C. is an English cinematographer.

== Early life ==
Born in Barking, London, Hardy attended Newport Film School and Northern Media School in Sheffield Hallam University where he specialised in cinematography.

== Career ==
Soon after, he started shooting music videos in the 90s in Sheffield, he also took on jobs for theatre companies experimenting with video art before transitioning as a DP for commercials. His major breakthrough would come when he served as director of photography for John Crowley's Boy A starring Andrew Garfield which won him the BAFTA Award for Best Photography and Lighting - Fiction/Entertainment.

In 2015, Hardy served as director of photography for Ex Machina which marked his first collaboration with Alex Garland. In an interview with Mandy, Hardy stated that he immediately accepted the job after reading the script, and that Garland had liked his work in Red Riding. Speaking of the collaboration, Hardy called the director a "great collaborator who takes a no nonsense approach which gets to the heart of it quickly." Early discussions with Garland mainly talked about propelling the film's small nature into a much larger scale as well as several inspirations such as Kazimir Malevich's abstracted art style and Saul Leiter's photographic portfolio. Hardy later reunited with Garland for Annihilation in 2018. Talking about the aspects of the film, Hardy used plants and sculptures as reference points as well as experimenting with different cameras and lenses to create "trippy effects" which layered over several other methods.

Later that year, he photographed the sixth entry of the Mission: Impossible film series, Mission: Impossible – Fallout, directed by Christopher McQuarrie. According to an interview published by British Cinematographer, Hardy stated that the film was "a completely different kind of challenge" and that McQuarrie wanted the film to be practical, eyeing for a more gritty and realistic feel. This approach opted for Hardy to operate the camera on his own, allowing for him to be closer to the action.

== Filmography ==
=== Film ===
Year	Title	Director	Notes
2007	Boy A	John Crowley	
2007	Exhibit A	Dom Rotheroe	
2008	Is Anybody There?	John Crowley	
2009	Public Sex	Simon Ellis	
2010	The First Grader	Justin Chadwick	
2011	The Forgiveness of Blood	Joshua Marston	
2011	Blitz	Elliott Lester	
2012	Shadow Dancer	James Marsh	
2012	Broken	Rufus Norris	
2013	The Invisible Woman	Ralph Fiennes	
2014	Every Secret Thing	Amy J. Berg	
2014	Testament of Youth	James Kent	
2015	Ex Machina	Alex Garland	First collaboration with Garland
2017	Euphoria	Lisa Langseth	
2018	Annihilation	Alex Garland	
2018	Mission: Impossible – Fallout	Christopher McQuarrie	
2022	Men	Alex Garland	
2022	The Man from Toronto	Patrick Hughes	
2023	The Book of Clarence	Jeymes Samuel	
2024	Civil War	Alex Garland	
2026	Supergirl	Craig Gillespie	
2026	Clayface	James Watkins	

=== Television ===
Year	Title	Director	Notes
1998	Hair of the Dog	Susannah Gent	TV special
1999	Acts of Passion	Susannah Gent	Episode "Bed Head"
2020	Devs	Alex Garland	Miniseries
2026	Blade Runner 2099	Jonathan van Tulleken	3 episodes

TV movies

Year	Title	Director	Notes
2009	Red Riding 1974	Julian Jarrold	Segment of Red Riding
2010	Whistle and I'll Come to You	Andy De Emmony	
2011	Stolen	Justin Chadwick	

== Awards and nominations ==
Year	Award	Category	Title	Result	Ref.
2007	British Academy Television Awards	Best Photography & Lighting: Fiction	Boy A	Won	
2015	British Society of Cinematographers	Best Cinematography	Ex Machina	Nominated	
2018	Seattle Film Critics Society	Best Cinematography	Mission: Impossible – Fallout	Nominated	
2020	Primetime Emmy Awards	Outstanding Cinematography	Devs	Nominated	
