= Boy A (film) =

2007 film directed by John Crowley

- Film poster
- Based on: Boy A by Jonathan Trigell
- Screenplay by: Mark O'Rowe
- Directed by: John Crowley
- Starring: Andrew Garfield; Peter Mullan; Siobhan Finneran; Josef Altin; Jeremy Swift; Shaun Evans; Katie Lyons; Anthony Lewis; Tilly Vosburgh; Steven Pacey
- Music by: Paddy Cunneen
- Country of origin: United Kingdom
- Original language: English

Production
- Producers: Lynn Horsford; Nick Marston; Tally Garner
- Cinematography: Rob Hardy
- Editor: Lucia Zucchetti
- Running time: 106 minutes
- Production companies: Film4; Cuba Pictures

Original release
- Network: Channel 4
- Release: 26 November 2007

Boy A is a 2007 British drama film directed by John Crowley, from a screenplay by Mark O'Rowe, based on the 2004 novel of the same name by Jonathan Trigell. The film stars Andrew Garfield in his film debut as Jack Burridge (né Eric Wilson), who is re-entering society under a new name in Manchester after having served 14 years in a Young Offender Institution; and Peter Mullan as Terry, Jack's caseworker. The novel is noted for similarities to the James Bulger case, whose offenders were released around the time of its publication.

Boy A had its world premiere at the 32nd Toronto International Film Festival on 8 September 2007. It was released as a television film in the United Kingdom, airing on Channel 4 on 26 November 2007, and was theatrically released in the United States by The Weinstein Company on 23 July 2008. The film received generally positive reviews from critics, with Garfield winning a BAFTA TV Award for his performance.

== Plot ==
The film begins when Eric Wilson is released from a secure unit or prison under the name Jack Burridge. His past is told through flashbacks.

Eric befriends Philip Craig, who is a troublemaker and rescues him from a group of bullies. It is later disclosed that Philip had been raped by his older brother. Philip gets into an argument with a girl from their school who comes across the two boys loitering in a park. She criticizes them and refers to them as "scum" when she witnesses Philip vandalising a park sign with a Stanley knife. Philip approaches her and starts slashing at her forearms with the knife. He grabs the girl and drags her under a bridge. When Philip drops the knife, Eric picks it up, and follows them under the bridge. The girl is killed, although the film shows neither who kills her nor how. Eric (dubbed as Boy A during the trial) and Philip are convicted and remanded into custody at secure units. Philip dies at 17, assumed to be suicide, but Eric believes that he may have been killed by other youth offenders.

Eric is later released and is guided by social worker Terry. Eric, shy and eager to be a good citizen again, builds up a new life under the name Jack Burridge. He finds a job, befriends his colleague Chris, falls in love with the office girl, Michelle, and rescues a little girl who would otherwise have died after a car crash. An article in a local newspaper portrays him as a hero and includes a picture of both boys in the story. Eric wants to be honest with Michelle and reveal his past, but Terry urges him not to do so because it is too dangerous. Terry is afraid that people may attack Eric because there is a reward of £20,000 (equivalent to £34,000 in 2025) for finding him. Terry argues that it is not dishonest because "Eric is history and Jack is a new person".

The rehabilitation worker is less satisfied with his own son. The son discovers Eric's true identity from newspaper articles about him being released, his new role as the hero and information he looks up without permission on his father's computer. Out of jealousy, he reveals this to the public and as a result, Eric loses his job and his best friend Chris distances himself from him. Michelle goes missing, and people suspect that Eric is somehow involved, though it is later revealed she has sequestered herself at home, devastated about the revelation that Jack is actually Eric.

Eric repeatedly tries to phone Terry but gets his voicemail. He flees from his home to avoid reporters and travels to Blackpool. There he meets (or imagines meeting) Michelle, who tells him she was not the one who revealed his past and would have eventually understood if he told her the truth, and then leaves. After saying farewell messages in voicemails to Terry and Chris, the film concludes with Eric hanging precariously over the edge of a pier.

== Cast ==
- Peter Mullan as Terry
- Andrew Garfield as Jack Burridge
- Shaun Evans as Chris
- Siobhan Finneran as Kelly
- Katie Lyons as Michelle
- Jeremy Swift as Dave
- James Young as Zeb

In addition, Alfie Owen appears as Eric Wilson, while Taylor Doherty portrays Philip Craig, as schoolboys at the time of the murder and their subsequent trial.

== Reception ==
=== Box office ===
Boy A received a limited release in North America in 10 theatres and grossed $113,662. The film grossed $1,647,281 in other territories for a worldwide total of $1,760,943.

=== Critical response ===
On the review aggregator website Rotten Tomatoes, Boy A has an 88% rating based on 59 reviews. The website's consensus reads, "Small in scale but large in impact, Boy A's career making performances (particularly that by star Andrew Garfield) and carefully crafted characters defy judgment and aggressively provoke debate." On Metacritic, it has a weighted average score of 75 out of 100, based on 22 critics.

Stephen Holden of The New York Times called the film a "wrenching melodrama". Wesley Morris of The Boston Globe praised Garfield's performance, writing that "the movie is worth seeing for Garfield".

=== Awards and nominations ===
Year	Award	Category	Recipient(s)	Result	Ref.
2008	54th British Academy Television Awards	Best Single Drama	John Crowley; Lynn Horsford; Mark O'Rowe	Nominated	
2008	54th British Academy Television Awards	Best Actor	Andrew Garfield	Won	
2008	9th British Academy Television Craft Awards	Best Director: Fiction	John Crowley	Won	
2008	9th British Academy Television Craft Awards	Best Breakthrough Talent	Mark O'Rowe	Nominated	
2008	9th British Academy Television Craft Awards	Best Original Music	Paddy Cunneen	Nominated	
2008	9th British Academy Television Craft Awards	Best Photography & Lighting: Fiction	Rob Hardy	Won	
2008	9th British Academy Television Craft Awards	Best Editing: Fiction	Lucia Zucchetti	Won	
2008	Royal Television Society Programme Awards	Single Drama	Boy A	Nominated	
2008	Royal Television Society Programme Awards	Writing: Drama	Mark O'Rowe	Nominated	
2008	Royal Television Society Programme Awards	Actor: Male	Andrew Garfield	Nominated	
2008	Royal Television Society Craft & Design Awards	Visual Effects - Picture Enhancement	Aidan Farrell	Nominated	
