= Intermission (film) =

2003 film by John Crowley

- United States theatrical release poster
- Directed by: John Crowley
- Written by: Mark O'Rowe
- Produced by: Stephen Woolley; Neil Jordan; Alan Moloney
- Starring: Colin Farrell; Cillian Murphy; Kelly Macdonald; Colm Meaney; Shirley Henderson
- Cinematography: Ryszard Lenczewski
- Edited by: Lucia Zucchetti
- Music by: John Murphy
- Production companies: Bord Scannán na hÉireann/Irish Film Board; UK Film Council; IFC Films; Company of Wolves; Parallel Film Productions; Portman Film
- Distributed by: Buena Vista International
- Release date: 29 August 2003
- Running time: 102 minutes
- Country: Ireland
- Language: English
- Budget: $5 million
- Box office: $5.1 million

Intermission is a 2003 Irish black comedy crime film directed by John Crowley and written by Mark O'Rowe. The film, set in Dublin, Ireland, contains many interconnected storylines, and is shot in a documentary-like style, with some sections presented as excerpts from television programs that exist within the show (one of the storylines follows a television documentary director).

It features several of Ireland's best-known actors, including Cillian Murphy, Colm Meaney and Colin Farrell, all of whom have featured in internationally successful films such as Oppenheimer (Murphy), The Commitments (Meaney) and Minority Report (Farrell). It also featured the Scottish actresses Kelly Macdonald and Shirley Henderson, who had both appeared in Trainspotting.

== Plot ==
The film opens with Lehiff (Colin Farrell) charming a cashier. After flirting with the girl, he punches her in the face and steals from the till. It quickly moves to John (Cillian Murphy) and Deirdre (Kelly Macdonald), a recently separated young couple. The film will revolve around their circle of friends.

It is quickly revealed that Lehiff is a petty criminal and always involved in trouble. Lehiff's nemesis, Garda Detective Jerry Lynch (Colm Meaney), presents himself as a saviour whose main mission is to fight the "scumbags" on Dublin's streets. He enlists the help of Ben Campion (Tomás Ó Súilleabháin), an ambitious film-maker and the bane of his "go-softer" boss, who considers Lynch too nasty a subject to be shown on a mainstream "docusoap" series on Irish television.

Next up is Mick (Brían F. O'Byrne), a Dublin bus driver. While on his route, Sally (Shirley Henderson) boards. Deeply insecure about her looks, she asks Mick about some hair on her lip, and he mocks her playfully. As the bus journey continues, Philip, a young boy, throws a rock at his bus, resulting in a bad crash, the aftermath of which Ben winds up shooting. Ben is told to focus his attention on Sally, Deirdre's sister, who helped the passengers after the crash. She grows bitter when Deirdre flaunts her new boyfriend, Sam (Michael McElhatton), a middle-aged bank manager who has left his wife of fourteen years, Noeleen (Deirdre O'Kane), leaving her to question her own self-worth as a woman and wife.

John is utterly lost without Deirdre and is determined to win her back. His co-worker Oscar (David Wilmot) attempts to cheer him up by taking him to a singles bar. Most of the patrons are middle-aged or older, and Oscar goes home with Noeleen, whose friend had taken her to the singles bar to cheer her up; neither Oscar nor John knows she is John's ex-girlfriend's new boyfriend's wife. While Oscar continues dating Noeleen for a time, she scratches his back up during sex, and he breaks up with her after she slugs him in the head during sex.

Mick, having become suspended from his job and low on funds, comes up with a scheme involving Lehiff and John. Wearing disguises, they kidnap Sam and hold Deirdre captive. They force Sam to go to his bank to get money for a ransom. Just as the plan seems to be working out, everything goes wrong, as Sam is assaulted by his enraged wife Noeleen on the street and the Gardaí are forced to intervene. Mick and John flee without the money.

Lehiff, left to guard Deirdre while John and Mick took Sam to the bank, raises Deirdre's suspicions; they struggle, and Lehiff bloodies Deirdre's nose. On his return, John is outraged at Lehiff's treatment of Deirdre. She recognizes John's voice through his disguise.

Later, Mick loses his job after being wrongfully blamed for the crash; he becomes obsessed with taking revenge on the boy who caused it. After chasing Philip in his car, he loses control and is left balancing over the canal. Philip sits on the bonnet and jumps off, letting the car drop into the canal.

Detective Lynch chases and corners Lehiff in an open field. He decides to take him on, while Ben films everything. Unfortunately, Lynch miscalculates; Lehiff gets the upper hand and threatens to kill him. Ben snatches at the gun and shoots Lehiff. Lynch covers it all up.

Oscar starts dating Deirdre's sister Sally. John and Deirdre reunite. As the credits roll, Noeleen and Sam, now reunited, are in their house watching television; she is purposely sitting on the remote control and bullying him into changing the channels by hand, making the viewer wonder whether her sadism was why he left her in the first place.

== Cast ==
- Colin Farrell as Lehiff, a petty criminal with a penchant for getting into trouble with the law
- Kelly Macdonald as Deirdre
- Cillian Murphy as John, Deirdre's former boyfriend
- Colm Meaney as Detective Jerry Lynch
- Shirley Henderson as Sally
- David Wilmot as Oscar
- Deirdre O'Kane as Noeleen
- Michael McElhatton as Sam, a middle-aged bank manager
- Tomás Ó Súilleabháin as Ben Campion, an ambitious film-maker
- Brían F. O'Byrne as Mick, the bus driver
- Ger Ryan as Maura, the mother
- Jane Brennan as Mrs. Rooney

== Release ==
=== Box office ===
The film earned €2.5 million at the Irish box office, briefly becoming the most successful independent Irish film. It earned $896,993 at the domestic box office and $4,278,222 internationally, for a worldwide total of $5,175,215, against a production budget of $5 million.

=== Critical reception ===
The film was generally well-received by critics. On the review aggregator website Rotten Tomatoes, 74% of 99 critics' reviews are positive, with an average rating of 6.6/10. The website's consensus reads: "An edgy and energetic ensemble story." Metacritic, which uses a weighted average, assigned the film a score of 64 out of 100, based on 27 critics, indicating "generally favorable" reviews.

Noted critics Roger Ebert and Richard Roeper gave the film positive reviews. Roeper described it as "a likable film about nasty people".

== Accolades ==
Following his work on the film, Patrick Condren became the first Irishman to be nominated at the Taurus World Stunt Awards.
