= Is Anybody There? =

2008 British film by John Crowley

- United Kingdom theatrical poster
- Directed by: John Crowley
- Written by: Peter Harness
- Produced by: David Heyman
- Starring: Michael Caine; David Morrissey; Anne-Marie Duff; Bill Milner
- Cinematography: Rob Hardy
- Edited by: Trevor Waite
- Music by: Joby Talbot
- Production companies: Story Island Entertainment; Big Beach; Heyday Films; BBC Films; Odyssey Entertainment
- Distributed by: Optimum Releasing
- Release dates: 7 September 2008 (TIFF); 1 May 2009 (UK)
- Running time: 95 minutes
- Country: United Kingdom
- Box office: $3.2 million

Is Anybody There? is a 2008 British drama film starring Michael Caine and directed by John Crowley. It was written by Peter Harness and produced by David Heyman, Marc Turtletaub and Peter Saraf. The film premiered at the 2008 Toronto International Film Festival under its original title Is There Anybody There? It garnered a nomination from the London Film Critics' Circle for Bill Milner as the Young British Performer of the Year.

== Plot ==
In 1987 Edward (Bill Milner) is a ten-year-old boy who lives at an old people's home run by his parents (David Morrissey and Anne-Marie Duff). Surrounded by death and dying, he becomes obsessed with finding evidence for the afterlife, often using a tape recorder to capture his "encounters".

Edward is helped in his search by Clarence (Michael Caine), an elderly ex-magician in the early stages of dementia who has recently entered the home. They first meet on the road near the home, when he is nearly hit by his camper van. Clarence had been living in it and is resistant to moving into the home.

Frustrated with having all of the residents in his home (he has lost his room, TV control and general privacy and freedom), Edward sets off the fire alarm. While everyone is out in the rain, he wreaks havoc alone inside.

The next day, Edward passes Clarence's van on his way to school. Its engine is running, and Edward opens the door to a cloud of carbon monoxide. While Clarence is hospitalised, Edward looks through his possessions. Clarence has lots of show bills of his past magic acts.

Edward visits Clarence in the hospital, bringing a few things and apologising. From this point on, the film follows their quest and their friendship, which ultimately allows both Edward and Clarence to come to terms with their respective situations.

Edward shows Clarence a peculiar ritual he does, trying to contact the dead. Magic interests both of them, so Edward learns some tricks to show the other children at school. On his birthday Clarence takes them out in the van, but he gets confused at a roundabout, causing a pile up. They cannot get the van started again, so a frustrated Clarence empties it, pushes it into the water, then argues with Edward saying there is no afterlife. Angry, the boy stomps off.

Later on, the home throws a party for Edward's birthday. He is not enthused, until Clarence offers to do magic. The card tricks go well, but one where Clarence is meant to pretend to cut off a finger goes wrong.

Edward organises a bus trip to Clarence's wife's grave. His dementia begins to show, as does not believe it is her grave. Edwards' parents pick them up. He believes Edward's mum is his dead estranged wife, so she accepts his apology.

Clarence quietly dies, but Edward has grown emotionally and, as his parents earlier on had had some problems, they decide to give it another try.

== Cast ==
- Michael Caine as Clarence (magician)
- Bill Milner as Edward
- David Morrissey as Dad
- Anne-Marie Duff as Mum
- Leslie Phillips as Reg
- Sylvia Syms as Lilian
- Peter Vaughan as Bob
- Thelma Barlow as Ena
- Rosemary Harris as Elsie
- Elizabeth Spriggs as Prudence (her final performance)

== Production ==
Shot on location in Hastings and Chalfont St Giles. Folkestone Central railway station doubled as a Yorkshire station as Clarence and Edward take a trip on the train for a day out. The sea shelter on Princes Parade in Hythe was used as a bus shelter in Hull. St Peter's Church of England Primary school in Folkestone was used as Edward's school in the film.

The ethereal music throughout the film was performed by David Coulter on a musical saw.

The production designer was Kave Quinn, with costumes designed by Jane Petrie. Casting was handled by Fiona Weir, and the film was co-produced by Rosie Alison with executive producers David M. Thompson and Christine Langan. Director John Crowley had previously directed the acclaimed Channel 4 drama Boy A, while producer Marc Turtletaub had previously produced Little Miss Sunshine.

== Release ==
The film premiered at the 2008 Toronto International Film Festival under the title Is There Anybody There? It was released in the United States on 17 April 2009 and in the United Kingdom on 1 May 2009.

According to the Hollywood Reporter, "The warmly quirky results should ensure there's definitely somebody out there for the film, specifically older audiences, and its universal appeal should help it land theatrical distribution domestically and internationally."

As of June 2023, the film holds a 65% approval rating on review site Rotten Tomatoes, based on 117 reviews with an average rating of 6.30 out of 10. The website's critics consensus reads: "...Michael Caine gives an excellent performance."
