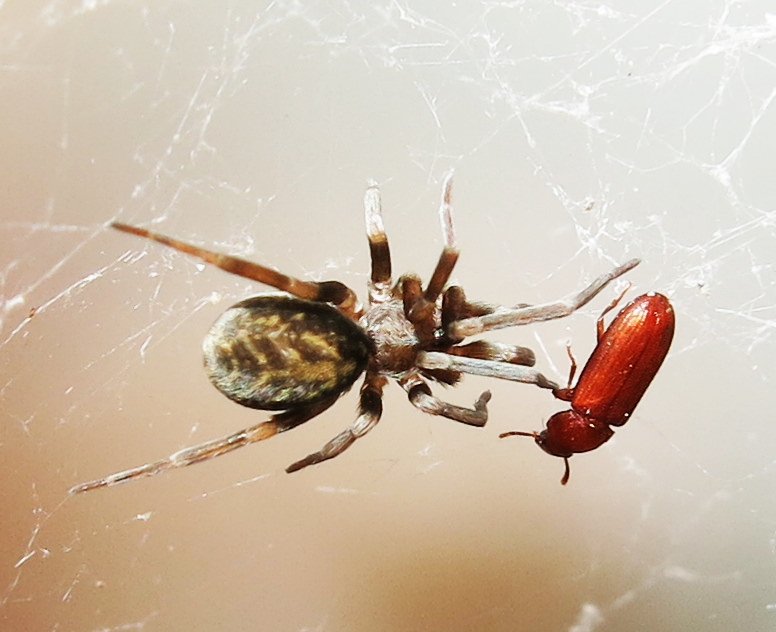

Scientific classification
- Kingdom: Animalia
- Phylum: Arthropoda
- Subphylum: Chelicerata
- Class: Arachnida
- Order: Araneae
- Infraorder: Araneomorphae
- Family: Filistatidae
- Genus: Pritha
- Species: P. garfieldi

Binomial name
- Pritha garfieldi Marusik & Zamani, 2015

= Pritha garfieldi =

Species of spider

Pritha garfieldi is a species of araneomorph spiders in the family Filistatidae. The species was named after the actor Andrew Garfield, who played the famous comic book hero Spider-Man.

== Distribution ==
This species is endemic to Tehran Province, Iran.

== Description ==
The male holotype measured 2.37 mm and the female paratype measured 4.48 mm.

== Etymology ==
This species was named after British-American actor Andrew Garfield, who has played the role of comic book superhero Spider-Man in three (should be four) movies.
