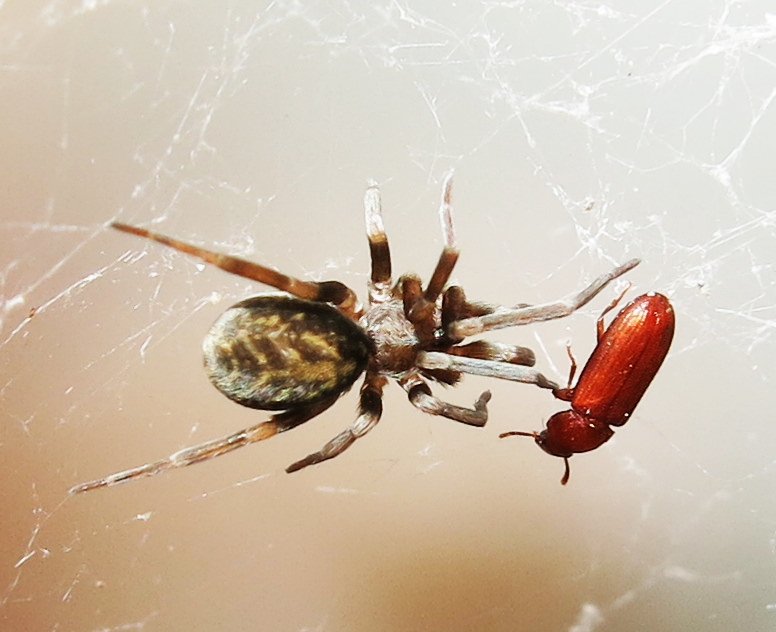
- Pritha garfieldi with prey

Scientific classification
- Kingdom: Animalia
- Phylum: Arthropoda
- Subphylum: Chelicerata
- Class: Arachnida
- Order: Araneae
- Infraorder: Araneomorphae
- Family: Filistatidae
- Genus: Pritha; Lehtinen, 1967

Type species
- P. nana (Simon, 1868)

Species
- 19, see text

= Pritha =

Genus of spiders

Pritha is a genus of crevice weavers that was first described by Pekka T. Lehtinen in 1967.

== Species ==
As of March 2022 it contains nineteen species found in Asia and Europe:

- Pritha albimaculata (O. Pickard-Cambridge, 1872) – Israel
- Pritha ampulla Wang, 1987 – China
- Pritha beijingensis Song, 1986 – China
- Pritha condita (O. Pickard-Cambridge, 1873) – Azores, St. Helena
- Pritha crosbyi (Spassky, 1938) – Azerbaijan, Kazakhstan, Central Asia
- Pritha debilis (Simon, 1911) – Algeria
- Pritha dharmakumarsinhjii Patel, 1978 – India
- Pritha garfieldi Marusik & Zamani, 2015 – Iran
- Pritha hirsuta (O. Pickard-Cambridge, 1872) – Israel
- Pritha nana (Simon, 1868) (type) – Mediterranean, India
- Pritha napadensis (Patel, 1975) – India
- Pritha pallida (Kulczyński, 1897) – Madeira, Portugal, Spain, Italy, Croatia, Greece, Georgia
- Pritha parva Legittimo, Simeon, Di Pompeo & Kulczycki, 2017 – France, Italy, Switzerland, Bulgaria
- Pritha poonaensis (Tikader, 1963) – India
- Pritha sagittata Legittimo, Simeon, Di Pompeo & Kulczycki, 2017 – Italy, Switzerland, Croatia
- Pritha spinula Wang, 1987 – China
- Pritha tenuispina (Strand, 1914) – Israel
- Pritha vestita (Simon, 1873) – France (Corsica), Bulgaria
- Pritha zebrata (Thorell, 1895) – Myanmar

== Description ==
They are small to medium sized spiders. Females have a fishbone-like pattern on the abdomen, while males have a whitish spot on the dorsal side of the abdomen. Their posterior median eyes are larger than the anterior medians. The cribellum is bipartite, and the calamistrum has three rows of setae of various lengths, however, the middle row is always the shortest.

== Behaviour and ecology ==
They are mostly synanthropic: they are found commonly inside buildings, in door or window frames. They make three-dimensional webs that have retreats into cracks and crevices. However, they are also found under pine or oak bark, close to human settlements. They feed on small arthropods.
