= Patrick Condren =

Irish actor

Patrick Condren (born 1967) is an Irish actor, stunt professional, and a former Irish heavyweight kickboxing champion. He is from Templeogue in Dublin.

Condren was nominated for his work on Intermission, alongside his brother, in the "best action in a foreign film" category at the 2004 Taurus World Stunt Awards. This nomination made them the first Irish people to be nominated for a World Stunt Award". As of 2006, Condron was working as a stunt coordinator.
