= Cham (novel) =

Novel by Jonathan Trigell

- First edition cover
- Author: Jonathan Trigell
- Publisher: Serpent's Tail
- Publication date: 2007
- ISBN: 978-1-85242-958-4
- OCLC: 132313924
- Dewey Decimal: 823/.92 22
- LC Class: PR6120.R54 C47 2007

Cham is the second novel by John Llewellyn Rhys Prize winning British writer Jonathan Trigell.

It is set in the French mountain town and extreme sports Mecca of Chamonix Mont Blanc, where the author also resides.

The novel contrasts the modern, hedonistic and adrenaline-fuelled, lifestyles of the town's younger inhabitants against those of the Romantic Period poets Lord Byron, Percy Bysshe Shelley and John Polidori who also spent much time in the Chamonix Valley and lived lives considered debauched at the time. It also juxtaposes the sublime splendour of the high mountains and the almost spiritual quality of skiing and snowboarding against the modern town's darker underbelly and a night time world of alcohol abuse, drugs and casual sex.

The publisher has given the book the strapline: 'The Beach on ice: deep powder, dead poets and moral free-fall in the death-sport capital of the world.'
