= John Crowley (director) =

Irish theatre and film director

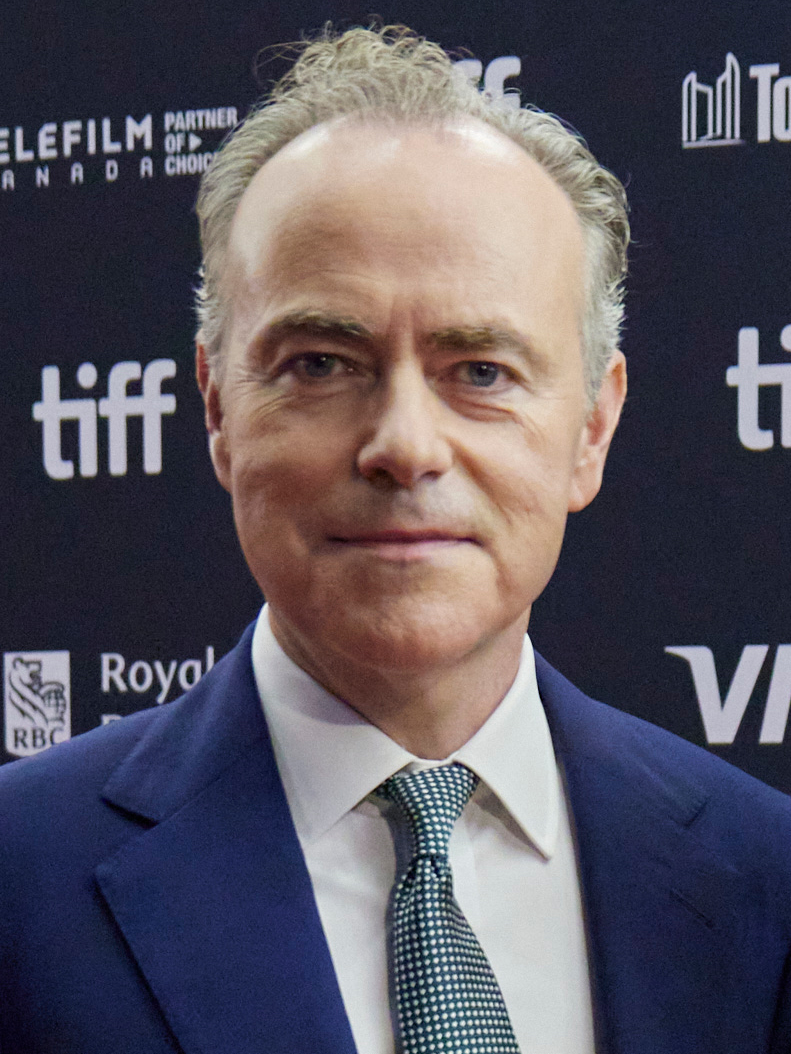
- John Crowley at the 2024 Toronto International Film Festival
- Born: 19 August 1969 (age 56); Cork, Ireland
- Occupation: Director
- Spouse: Fiona Weir

John Crowley (born 19 August 1969) is an Irish theatre and film director. He is best known for the films Brooklyn (2015) and his debut feature, Intermission (2003), for which he won an Irish Film and Television Award for Best Director. He is a brother of the designer Bob Crowley.

== Life and career ==
=== Early years and education ===
Crowley earned a BA in English and Philosophy (1990) and an MA in philosophy from University College Cork.

=== Career ===
Crowley became involved in theatre as a student, seeing it as a stepping stone to directing film. He began directing plays in Dublin in the early 1990s, reached London's West End by 1996 and eventually become an associate director at the Donmar Warehouse. In 2000, he directed Come and Go as part of the Beckett on Film series and made his feature debut Intermission (2003), a comedy drama set in Dublin, starring Colin Farrell, Cillian Murphy and Kelly Macdonald, based on a screenplay by playwright Mark O'Rowe.

In May 2005, Crowley, along with Danny Boyle, launched the UK Film Council Development Fund's "25 Words or Less: Director’s Cut" scheme to develop a feature film project, stating that he wanted particularly to "create a contemporary 'rebirth' or transformation story about a man or woman who begins as someone that spreads coldness."

In 2007, Crowley reteamed with O'Rowe for the thought-provoking BAFTA-winning drama Boy A, about a young man's return to civilian life after imprisonment for a brutal childhood killing, which was made for British television but was released theatrically in the US the following year. It won him the Best Director (Fiction) award at the 2008 British Academy Television Craft Awards.

Additionally, Crowley was Tony nominated for the hugely successful London and Broadway runs of Martin McDonagh's play The Pillowman in 2003 and 2005. He directed Neve Campbell and Cillian Murphy in the West End production of Love Song in 2006–7, and in 2007 filmed a television version of Harold Pinter's Celebration starring Michael Gambon, Stephen Rea and Colin Firth. In 2009 he directed the film Is Anybody There?, set in 1980s seaside Britain, written by Peter Harness and starring Michael Caine as a grumpy ex-magician. In 2010, Crowley teamed once again with McDonagh for A Behanding in Spokane on Broadway.

In July 2016, it was announced that Crowley will direct the screen adaptation of Donna Tartt's Pulitzer Prize-winning novel The Goldfinch for Warner Bros. and RatPac Entertainment, starring Ansel Elgort, Oakes Fegley, Aneurin Barnard and Finn Wolfhard.

In 2017 it was announced that he would be directing a film adaption of Bernard MacLaverty's Midwinter Break.

== Works ==
=== Theatre ===
- A Very Expensive Poison (2019) – The Old Vic – written by Lucy Prebble.
- The Present (2016) on Broadway – Anton Chekhov's Platonov adaptation by Andrew Upton. Starring Cate Blanchett, Richard Roxburgh, Toby Schmitz, Jacqueline McKenzie.
- The Playboy of the Western World (2011) – The Old Vic – Starring Ruth Negga, Niamh Cusack and Robert Sheehan.
- A Behanding in Spokane (2010) on Broadway.
- A Steady Rain (2009) on Broadway. Starring Hugh Jackman and Daniel Craig
- Love Song (2006–07) – Written by John Kolvenbach – New Ambassadors Theatre (West End), London. This production, which was the UK premiere, starred Neve Campbell & Cillian Murphy.
- The Pillowman (2005) – International tour.
- The Pillowman (2003–04) – Royal National Theatre.
- On An Average Day (2002) – the Comedy Theatre (West End), London. It starred Woody Harrelson & Kyle MacLachlan.
- Tales from Hollywood (2001) – Donmar Warehouse, London.
- Juno and the Paycock (2000) – Gramercy Theatre, New York.
- The Turn of the Screw (2000) – Welsh National Opera.
- Juno and the Paycock (1999) – Donmar Warehouse, London.
- Macbeth (1999) – UK tour.
- Into the Woods (1998–99) – Donmar Warehouse, London.
- How I Learned to Drive (1998) at the Donmar Warehouse, London (UK premiere).
- An Irish Trilogy, aka Shadows (1998–99) – Royal Shakespeare Company.
- The Maids (1997) – UK tour.
- Fair Ladies at a Game of Poem Cards (1996) – Royal National Theatre.
- Double Helix (1996) – Dublin Theatre Festival/ Peacock Theatre, Dublin.
- Six Characters in Search of an Author (1995) – Abbey Theatre, Dublin.
- The Crucible (1995) – Abbey Theatre, Dublin.
- True Lines (1994) – Dublin Theatre Festival/ Bush Theatre, London
- One for the Road (1994) – Gate Theatre, Dublin.
- The Master Builder (1993–94) – Royal Lyceum Theatre, Edinburgh/ Riverside Studios, London. Co-directed with Brian Cox.
- The Match Seller Girl – Theatre Project Tokyo, Japan.
- Asylum! Asylum! – Peacock Theatre, Dublin.
- John Hughdy-Tom John – Druid Theatre Company.
- Phaedra – Gate Theatre, Dublin.

=== Film ===
- Come and Go (2000) (Short film)
- Intermission (2003)
- Boy A (2007)
- Is Anybody There? (2009)
- Closed Circuit (2013)
- Brooklyn (2015)
- The Goldfinch (2019)
- We Live in Time (2024)
- Walk the Blue Fields (TBA)

=== Television ===
| Year | Title | Notes |
|---|---|---|
| 2007 | Celebration | Televised play |
| 2015 | True Detective | Episodes: "Other Lives" and "Omega Station" |
| 2021 | Modern Love | Episode: "In the waiting room of estranged spouses" |
| 2022 | Life After Life | Miniseries, Also executive producer |
| 2023 | Black Mirror | Episode: "Beyond the Sea" |

== Recurring collaborators ==
| Work Actor | 2003 | 2007 | 2008 | 2013 | 2015 | 2019 | 2024 | —N/a |
| Work Actor | Intermission | Boy A | Is Anybody There? | Closed Circuit | Brooklyn | The Goldfinch | We Live in Time | Total |
|---|---|---|---|---|---|---|---|---|
| Jane Brennan | Yes | No | No | No | Yes | No | No | 2 |
| Denis Conway | Yes | No | No | No | Yes | No | No | 2 |
| Andrew Garfield | No | Yes | No | No | No | No | Yes | 2 |
| Anne-Marie Duff | No | No | Yes | Yes | No | No | No | 2 |
| Jim Broadbent | No | No | No | Yes | Yes | No | No | 2 |

== Accolades ==
| Year | Award | Category | Title | Result |
|---|---|---|---|---|
| 2003 | IFTA Film & Drama Awards | Best Film Director | Intermission | Won |
| 2003 | Galway Film Fleadh | Best First Feature Film | Intermission | Won |
| 2003 | Galway Film Fleadh | First Feature Film | Intermission | Won |
| 2004 | British Independent Film Awards | The Douglas Hickox Award (Best Debut Director) | Intermission | Won |
| 2004 | Galway Film Fleadh | Best First Feature | Intermission | Won |
| 2006 | Golden Rooster Awards | Best International Director | Intermission | Won |
| 2008 | British Academy Television Awards | Best Single Drama | Boy A | Nominated |
| 2008 | British Academy Television Craft Awards | Best Director: Fiction | Boy A | Won |
| 2008 | Banff World Media Festival | Best Made for TV Movie | Boy A | Nominated |
| 2008 | Berlin International Film Festival | Prize of the Ecumenical Jury | Boy A | Won |
| 2008 | Dinard British Film Festival | Golden Hitchcock | Boy A | Won |
| 2008 | Dinard British Film Festival | Silver Hitchcock | Boy A | Won |
| 2008 | Film by the Sea | Youth Jury Award | Boy A | Won |
| 2008 | Irish Film & Television Awards | Best Film Director | Boy A | Nominated |
| 2010 | Bodil Awards | Best Non-American Film | Boy A | Nominated |
| 2010 | CinEuphoria Awards | Top Ten of the Year - International Competition | Boy A | Won |
| 2015 | Denver Film Festival | Narrative Feature | Brooklyn | Won |
| 2015 | Detroit Film Critics Society | Best Director | Brooklyn | Nominated |
| 2015 | Dublin Film Critics' Circle | Best Director | Brooklyn | Nominated |
| 2015 | IndieWire Critics Poll | Best Director | Brooklyn | Nominated |
| 2015 | Mill Valley Film Festival | World Cinema | Brooklyn | Nominated |
| 2015 | San Diego Film Critics Society Awards | Best Director | Brooklyn | Nominated |
| 2015 | San Francisco Film Critics Circle Awards | Best Director | Brooklyn | Nominated |
| 2015 | Twin Cities Film Fest | Feature Film | Brooklyn | Won |
| 2015 | Vancouver International Film Festival | People's Choice | Brooklyn | Won |
| 2015 | Virginia Film Festival | Narrative Feature | Brooklyn | Won |
| 2016 | British Academy Film Awards | Outstanding British Film | Brooklyn | Won |
| 2016 | Irish Film & Television Awards | Best Film Director | Brooklyn | Nominated |
| 2017 | Kinema Junpo | Best Foreign Language Film | Brooklyn | Nominated |
| 2017 | Kinema Junpo | Best Foreign Language Film (Readers' Choice) | Brooklyn | Nominated |
