= 2008 British Academy Television Awards =

British awards ceremony

- Date: 20 April 2008
- Site: London Palladium
- Hosted by: Graham Norton

Highlights
- Best Comedy Series: Fonejacker
- Best Drama: The Street
- Best Actor: Andrew Garfield; Boy A
- Best Actress: Eileen Atkins; Cranford
- Best Comedy Performance: James Corden Gavin & Stacey

Television coverage
- Channel: BBC One
- Ratings: 5.67 million

The 2008 British Academy Television Awards were held on 20 April at the London Palladium Theatre in London. The ceremony was broadcast live on BBC One in the United Kingdom. The nominations were announced on 18 March 2008. Drama Cranford received the most nominations with four, making Judi Dench the most nominated actress in BAFTA history for her work on TV and film combined. Long-running soap opera Coronation Street failed to earn a nomination. Bruce Forsyth received the Academy Fellowship Award.

Winners in bold.

== Nominations ==
- **Best Actor**
  - **Andrew Garfield — Boy A** (Channel 4)
  - Tom Hardy — Stuart: A Life Backwards (BBC Two)
  - Matthew Macfadyen — Secret Life (Channel 4)
  - Antony Sher — Primo (BBC Four)
- **Best Actress**
  - **Eileen Atkins — Cranford** (BBC One)
  - Judi Dench — Cranford (BBC One)
  - Gina McKee — The Street (BBC One)
  - Kierston Wareing — It's a Free World... (Channel 4)
- **Best Entertainment performance**
  - Simon Amstell — Never Mind the Buzzcocks (BBC Two)
  - Alan Carr and Justin Lee Collins — The Friday Night Project (Channel 4)
  - Stephen Fry — QI (BBC Two)
  - **Harry Hill** — **Harry Hill's TV Burp** (ITV)
- **Best comedy performance**
  - Peter Capaldi — The Thick of It (BBC Four)
  - **James Corden — Gavin & Stacey** (BBC Three)
  - Stephen Merchant — Extras Christmas special (BBC One)
  - David Mitchell — Peep Show (Channel 4)
- **Best single drama**
  - Boy A (Channel 4)
  - Coming Down the Mountain (BBC One)
  - **The Mark of Cain** (Channel 4)
  - The Trial of Tony Blair (More4)
- **Best drama serial**
  - **Britz** (Channel 4)
  - Cranford (BBC One)
  - Five Days (BBC One)
  - Murphy's Law (BBC One)
- **Best drama series**
  - Life on Mars (BBC One)
  - Rome (BBC Two)
  - Skins (E4)
  - **The Street** (BBC One)
- **Best continuing drama**
  - The Bill (ITV)
  - EastEnders (BBC One)
  - Emmerdale (ITV)
  - **Holby City** (BBC One)
- **Best factual series**
  - Meet the Natives (Channel 4)
  - Paul Merton in China (Five)
  - Tribe (BBC Two)
  - **The Tower: A Tale of Two Cities** (BBC One)
- **Best entertainment programme**
  - Britain's Got Talent (ITV)
  - **Harry Hill's TV Burp** (ITV)
  - Have I Got News for You (BBC One)
  - Strictly Come Dancing (BBC One)
- **Best situation comedy**
  - Benidorm (ITV)
  - The IT Crowd (Channel 4)
  - **Peep Show** (Channel 4)
  - The Thick of It (BBC Four)
- **Best comedy programme**
  - The Armstrong and Miller Show (BBC One)
  - **Fonejacker** (Channel 4)
  - Russell Brand's Ponderland (Channel 4)
  - Star Stories (Channel 4)
- **Audience award**
  - The Apprentice (BBC Two)
  - Andrew Marr's History of Modern Britain (BBC Two)
  - Britain's Got Talent (ITV)
  - Cranford (BBC One)
  - **Gavin & Stacey** (BBC Three)
  - Strictly Come Dancing (BBC One)
- **Best single documentary**
  - Beautiful Young Minds (BBC Two)
  - **Lie of the Land** (Channel 4)
  - Malcolm and Barbara: Love's Farewell (ITV)
  - Parallel Worlds, Parallel Lives (BBC Four)
- **Best feature**
  - Heston Blumenthal: In Search of Perfection (BBC Two)
  - **Ramsay's Kitchen Nightmares (Channel 4)**
  - The Secret Millionaire (Channel 4)
  - Top Gear (BBC Two)
- **Best international show**
  - Californication (Five)
  - Family Guy (BBC Three)
  - **Heroes** (BBC Two)
  - My Name Is Earl (Channel 4)
- **Best special factual**
  - **Andrew Marr's History of Modern Britain** (BBC Two)
  - Earth: The Power of the Planet (BBC Two)
  - The Genius of Photography (BBC Four)
  - The Relief of Belsen (Channel 4)
- **Best current affairs**
  - **China's Stolen Children — A Dispatches Special** (Channel 4)
  - Dispatches — Fighting The Taliban (Channel 4)
  - Honour Kills (BBC Three)
  - Panorama: Dog Fighting Undercover (BBC One)
- **Best news coverage**
  - BBC Ten O'Clock News: War in Afghanistan (BBC One)
  - Channel 4 News: Iraq — The Surge (Channel 4)
  - ITV Evening News: Zimbabwe — The Tyranny and the Tragedy (ITV)
  - **Sky News — Glasgow Airport Attack** (Sky News)
- **Best sport**
  - The Boat Race (ITV)
  - **ITV F1: 2007 Canadian Grand Prix Live** (ITV)
  - 2007 Rugby World Cup: England v France semi-final (ITV)
  - Wimbledon — The Men's Final (BBC One)
- **Best interactivity**
  - Big Art Mob (Channel 4)
  - Doctor Who Comic Maker (BBC One)
  - **Spooks Interactive** (BBC One)
  - The X Factor (ITV)
- **Special Award**
  - Paul Watson
- **BAFTA Fellowship**
  - Bruce Forsyth
