= Katie Lyons =

English actress

- Born: 18 August 1981 (age 43); Southampton, England
- Occupation: Actress
- Years active: 1997–present

Katie Lyons (born 18 August 1981) is an English actress, most noted for her performance as Naughty Rachel in the Channel 4 sitcom Green Wing.

She has also appeared in Doc Martin, The Bill, EastEnders, The Catherine Tate Show, The Complete Guide to Parenting, The Boat That Rocked (2009), Boy A (2007) and Him & Her, with small roles in The Crimson Petal and the White in 2011 Ashes to Ashes in 2010. From 2013 to 2015 Lyons featured as Corporal Lynda Bird in the BBC Three comedy Bluestone 42.

She is also voice actress for the character "Proxy" in the Splash Damage's 2015 online game "Dirty Bomb" and for the character "Sarah" in the 2016 video game Fragments of Him.

In 2019, Lyons played DS Jo Brunt in the British drama Manhunt. More recently (2022) she appeared in London Kills, season 3 episode 2.
