= Mark O'Rowe =

Irish playwright and screenwriter

Mark O'Rowe is an Irish playwright and screenwriter.

== Life and career ==
Mark O'Rowe was born in 1970 in Dublin, Ireland, to parents Hugh and Patricia O'Rowe (to whom he dedicated his 1999 play, Howie the Rookie). He grew up in Tallaght, a working-class outer suburb of Dublin City in South Dublin, and he claims that much of the violence in his work stems from watching and rewatching a tremendous amount of violent, bloody movies when he was in his teens.

== Works ==
=== Plays ===
- The Approach (2018)
- Our Few and Evil Days (2014)
- Terminus (2007)
- Howie the Rookie (1999)
- The Aspidistra Code (1995)
- Anna's Ankle
- From Both Hips
- Crestfall
- Made in China
- Reunion

=== Film and television ===
- Intermission
- Perrier's Bounty
- Boy A
- Broken
- The Delinquent Season
- Normal People (TV series)

== Accolades ==
=== As a playwright ===
- Irish Times/ESB Theatre Award for Best New Play for Howie the Rookie.
- George Devine Award for Best New Play for Howie The Rookie.
- Rooney Prize for Irish Literature for Howie the Rookie in 1999.

=== As a screenwriter ===
- He won the IFTA Award for the Best Screenplay in 2003 for Intermission

== See also ==
- List of Irish dramatists
