= Andrew Garfield =

British and American actor (born 1983)

- Garfield in 2026
- Born: Andrew Russell Garfield; 20 August 1983 (age 43); Los Angeles, California, U.S.
- Citizenship: United States • United Kingdom
- Education: Royal Central School of Speech and Drama
- Occupation: Actor
- Years active: 2004–present
- Awards: Full list

Andrew Russell Garfield (born 20 August 1983) is a British and American actor. He is known for his work across a variety of genres, from biographical dramas to action films, spanning both independent and blockbuster productions. His accolades include a Tony Award, two Critics' Choice Awards, a Golden Globe Award and a British Academy Television Award, in addition to nominations for two Academy Awards, three British Academy Film Awards and a Primetime Emmy Award. In 2022, Time magazine included him in its list of the 100 most influential people.

Garfield began his career on West End stage and British television. His breakout roles came as a juvenile convict in the television film Boy A (2007), followed by David Fincher's biographical drama The Social Network (2010) and as a dim young man caught in a love triangle in Mark Romanek's dystopian romance Never Let Me Go (2010). Garfield achieved wider recognition for starring as the title character in Marc Webb's Spider-Man films (2012–2014) and the Marvel Cinematic Universe film Spider-Man: No Way Home (2021).

Garfield received Academy Award nominations for Best Actor for his performances as Desmond Doss in the war film Hacksaw Ridge (2016) and Jonathan Larson in the musical drama Tick, Tick... Boom! (2021). His other film credits include Silence (2016), Under the Silver Lake (2018), The Eyes of Tammy Faye (2021) and We Live in Time (2024). On television, he starred in the crime drama miniseries Under the Banner of Heaven (2022), which earned him a nomination for the Primetime Emmy Award for Outstanding Lead Actor in a Limited Series.

On stage, Garfield made his Broadway debut as Biff Loman in the revival of Death of a Salesman (2012), which earned him a nomination for the Tony Award for Best Featured Actor in a Play. For his performance as Prior Walter in the National Theatre revival of Angels in America on Broadway, he received a nomination for the Laurence Olivier Award for Best Actor and later won the Tony Award for Best Actor in a Play.

== Early life and education ==
Andrew Russell Garfield was born on 20 August 1983 in Los Angeles, California. His mother, Lynn (née Hillman), was from Essex, England, and his father, Richard Garfield, is from California. Richard's parents were also English. Garfield's parents moved the family from the United States to England when he was three years old, and he was brought up in Epsom, Surrey.

He is Jewish on his father's side, and describes himself as a "Jewish artist". His paternal grandparents were from Jewish immigrant families who moved to London from Poland, Russia, and Romania, and the family surname was originally "Garfinkel". In April 2025, Garfield participated in the British TV show Who Do You Think You Are? He uncovered his Jewish roots in Kielce, Poland, and also found that a great-grandaunt, Ruchla Garfinkiel, married the first cousin of Władysław Szpilman, the subject of the 2002 film The Pianist.

Garfield's parents ran a small interior-design business. His mother was also a teaching assistant at a nursery school, and his father became head coach of the Guildford City Swimming Club. He has an older brother who is a National Health Service (NHS) doctor at Royal Brompton Hospital. Garfield was a gymnast and a swimmer during his early years. He originally intended to study business, but became interested in acting at age sixteen when a friend convinced him to take theatre studies at A-level, as they were one pupil short of being able to run the class. Garfield was educated at Priory Preparatory School in Banstead and later City of London Freemen's School in Ashtead, before training at the Central School of Speech and Drama, University of London. His first job was at Starbucks, being moved between three separate establishments in Golders Green and Hendon.

== Career ==
=== Early work and breakthrough (2004–2011) ===
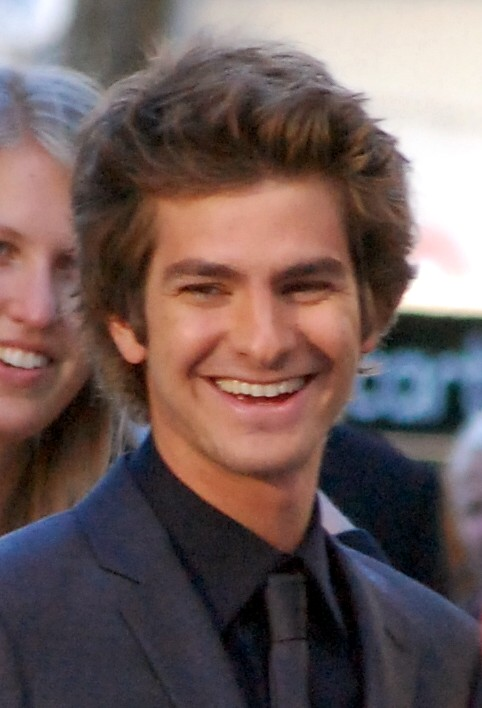
Garfield attending the premiere of The Imaginarium of Doctor Parnassus at the 2009 Toronto International Film Festival

Garfield began taking acting classes in Guildford, Surrey, when he was nine, and appeared in a youth theatre production of Bugsy Malone. He also joined a small youth theatre workshop group in Epsom and took theatre studies at A-level before studying for a further three years at a UK conservatoire, the Central School of Speech and Drama. Upon graduating in 2004, he began working primarily in stage acting. In 2004, he won a Manchester Evening News Theatre Award for Best Newcomer for his performance in Kes at Manchester's Royal Exchange Theatre (where he also played Romeo the year after), and won the Outstanding Newcomer Award at the 2006 Evening Standard Theatre Awards. Garfield made his British television debut in 2005 appearing in the Channel 4 teen drama Sugar Rush. In 2007, he garnered public attention when he appeared in the series three of the BBC's Doctor Who, in the episodes "Daleks in Manhattan" and "Evolution of the Daleks". Garfield commented that it was "an honour" to be a part of Doctor Who. In October 2007, he was named one of Variety's "10 Actors to Watch". He made his American film debut in November 2007, playing an American university student in the ensemble drama Lions for Lambs, with co-stars Tom Cruise, Meryl Streep, and Robert Redford. "I'm just lucky to be there working on the same project as them, although I don't really expect to be recognized later by audiences", Garfield told Variety in 2007. In his review for The Boston Globe, Wesley Morris considered Garfield's work "a willing punching bag for the movie's jabs and low blows".

In the Channel 4 drama Boy A, released in November 2007, he portrayed a notorious killer trying to find new life after prison. The role garnered him the 2008 BAFTA Award for Best Actor. Amy Biancolli of the Houston Chronicle wrote, "there is no doubt about the intelligence and sensitivity" of Garfield's portrayal. Minneapolis Star Tribune's Christy DeSmith echoed Biancolli's sentiment, citing his "detailed expressions" as an example. Writing in The Seattle Times, John Hartl noted that Garfield demonstrated range in the role, and concluded: "Garfield always manages to capture his passion". Joe Morgenstern, the critic for The Wall Street Journal, dubbed Garfield's performance "phenomenal", assessing that he "makes room for the many and various pieces of Jack's personality". In 2008, he had a minor role in the film The Other Boleyn Girl, and was named one of the Shooting Stars at the Berlin International Film Festival. In 2009, Garfield held supporting roles in the Terry Gilliam film The Imaginarium of Doctor Parnassus and the Red Riding television trilogy. Kenneth Turan of the Los Angeles Times thought that Garfield gave a stand out performance in the latter.

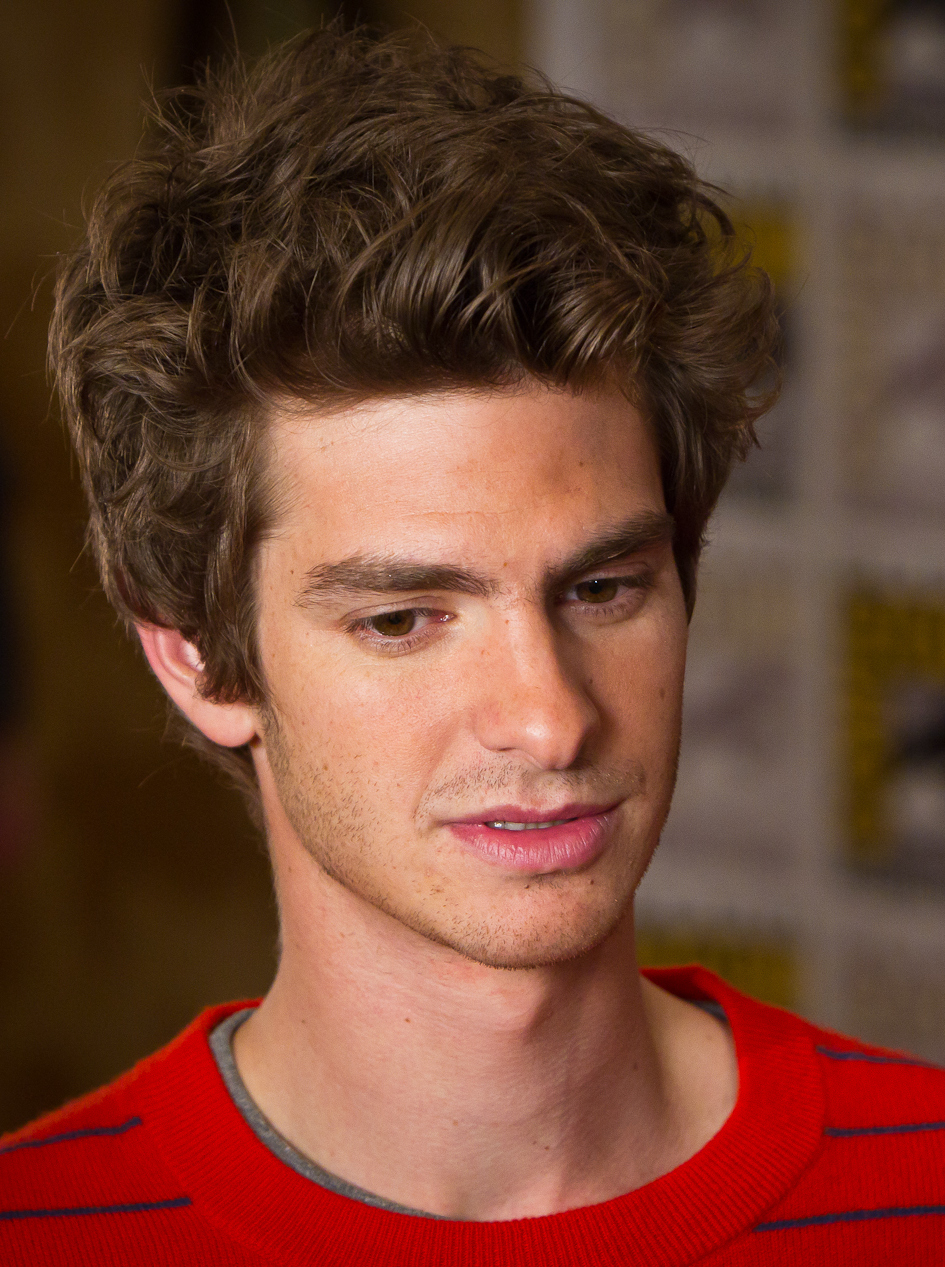
Garfield at the 2011 San Diego Comic-Con

In 2010, Garfield co-starred opposite Carey Mulligan and Keira Knightley in Mark Romanek's dystopian science-fiction drama Never Let Me Go, an adaptation of Kazuo Ishiguro's 2005 novel of the same name. He said of his character, Tommy D., "There's a sense of anxiety that runs through these kids, especially Tommy, because he's so sensory and feeling and animalistic, that's my perspective of him." Garfield was attracted to the film based on the existential questions the story expresses. He said the experience of being a part of Never Let Me Go was "just a dream to come true". He further remarked that the scenes in which his character—unable to contain his frustration—erupts with a wail, were "intense" for him. "I think those screams are inside all of us, I just got a chance to let mine out". For his portrayal of a well-meaning, but dim young man caught in a love triangle, he won the 2010 Saturn Award for Best Supporting Actor. Writing for Entertainment Weekly, Owen Gleiberman praised the performances of the lead cast, reflecting that "these three all act with a spooky, haunted innocence that gets under your skin." In comparison to Mulligan and Knightley, Scott Bowles, writing for USA Today, deemed Garfield "the real find" of Never Let Me Go.

The same year, Garfield co-starred opposite Jesse Eisenberg in The Social Network, a drama based on the founders of Facebook. On his character, Garfield remarked, "No one knows who Eduardo Saverin is, and I don't either. Of course, the fact he's a real-life human being, breathing on this Earth somewhere, creates a whole new dimension to my approach because you feel a greater sense of responsibility". Initially, the film's director, David Fincher, had met Garfield under the auspices of him playing Mark Zuckerberg, having been referred to him by Mark Romanek. However, Fincher did not like Garfield for the part as he found Garfield's "incredible emotional access to his kind of core humanity" better tailored for the role of Saverin. Garfield's performance was very well received; he earned wider recognition and numerous nominations, including BAFTA nominations for Best Actor in a Supporting Role and Rising Star, as well as a Golden Globe nomination for Best Performance in a Supporting Role. Mark Kermode of the BBC expressed his surprise that Garfield had been overlooked for an Academy Award nomination, opining that "everyone knows he's one of the very best things about The Social Network." Writing in The Wall Street Journal, Joe Morgenstern thought the role was portrayed with "great subtlety and rueful charm". Rolling Stone said Garfield delivered "a vulnerability that raises the emotional stakes in a movie", and proclaimed: "Keep your eyes on Garfield – he's shatteringly good, the soul of a film that might otherwise be without one."

=== The Amazing Spider-Man and worldwide recognition (2012–2016) ===
Garfield was cast as Spider-Man/Peter Parker, opposite Emma Stone as his love interest Gwen Stacy, in Marc Webb's The Amazing Spider-Man (2012), a reboot of the Spider-Man film series. Garfield saw his casting as a "massive challenge in many ways", having to make the character "authentic" and "live and breathe in a new way". He described Peter as someone he could relate to and stated that the character had been an important influence on him since he was a child. For the role, he studied movements of athletes and spiders, and tried to incorporate them, and practiced yoga and pilates. The Amazing Spider-Man earned a worldwide total of $752,216,557, and Garfield's performance was generally well received. The Guardian's Peter Bradshaw labelled his portrayal as the "definitive Spider-Man" and Tom Charity of CNN commended his "combination of fresh-faced innocence, nervous agitation and wry humor".

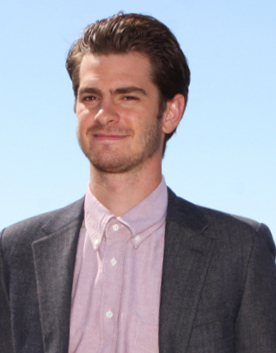
Garfield during a photo-call for The Amazing Spiderman 2 in Sydney, Australia, 2014

In March 2012, Garfield made his Broadway theatre debut as Biff Loman in the revival of Death of a Salesman. According to The New York Times's David Rooney, Garfield had successfully "exposed the raw ache of Biff's solitude". Garfield was nominated for a Tony Award for Best Featured Actor in a Play for his performance. Two years later, Garfield hosted an episode of Saturday Night Live and appeared in a music video for the song "We Exist" by Arcade Fire, playing a trans woman. Also in 2014, he co-produced and starred in the 2014 independent drama 99 Homes and reprised the titular role in The Amazing Spider-Man 2. Following a deal between Sony and Marvel Studios to integrate the Spider-Man character into the Marvel Cinematic Universe, sequels to the latter film were scrapped, and the role was taken on by Tom Holland in a reboot. Arachnologists Yuri M. Marusik and Alireza Zamani honored Garfield's portrayal of the role by naming a new species of crevice weaver spider, Pritha garfieldi, after him.

Following a year-long absence from the screen, Garfield had starring roles in two films of 2016, Martin Scorsese's drama Silence and Mel Gibson's war film Hacksaw Ridge. In the former, based on Shūsaku Endō's 1966 novel of the same name, Garfield played Sebastião Rodrigues, a Portuguese Jesuit priest in the seventeenth century who travels to Japan to spread his faith. Garfield spent a year with James Martin studying to be a Jesuit priest and went on a silent retreat in Wales. The film's arduous principal photography took place in Taiwan, and Garfield lost 40 pounds (18 kg) to achieve his character's physicality. Kate Taylor of The Globe and Mail disliked the film and wrote that Garfield "is sweetly resolute and gently anguished as the missionary Rodrigues but any hope that the actor might elucidate the psychology of philosophical certitude or the pain of religious doubt proves vain". At the box office, it earned less than half of its $50 million budget. Hacksaw Ridge, however, was a commercial success, earning over $175.3 million worldwide. In it, Garfield portrayed Desmond Doss, a combat medic during World War II, who was the first conscientious objector in American history to be awarded the Medal of Honor. Writing for USA Today, Brian Truitt labelled the film as "brutally intense and elegantly crafted"; he believed that the central role allowed Garfield to bring depth to his career and commended him for portraying Doss with both "simple sweetness" and "steadfast mettle". He received a nomination for the Academy Award for Best Actor for Hacksaw Ridge.

=== Established career (2017–present) ===
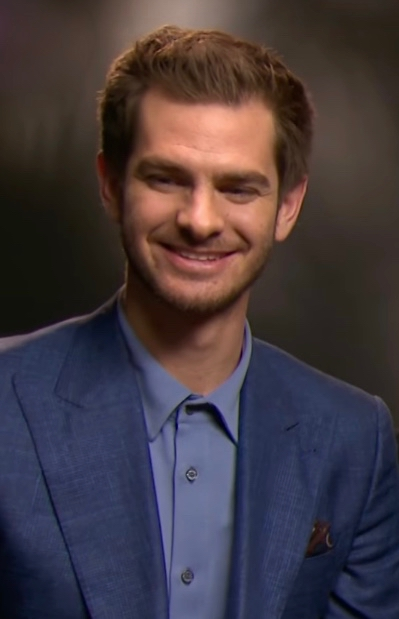
Garfield promoting Breathe in 2017

Garfield played the role of Prior Walter in Tony Kushner's two-part play Angels in America at the Lyttelton Theatre in the National Theatre, London from April to August 2017, and the performance was broadcast live to cinemas around the world in summer 2017 through the National Theatre Live series. It was directed by Marianne Elliott and co-starred Nathan Lane, James McArdle, Russell Tovey, and Denise Gough. Paul T Davis of The British Theatre Guide wrote that Garfield was "transformative and unrecognisable in places, completely inhabiting camp, laconic, frightened and totally loveable Prior Walter". He was nominated for the Laurence Olivier Award for Best Actor.

Garfield's sole film release of 2017 was the biopic Breathe, in which he portrayed Robin Cavendish, a young man paralysed by polio. In preparation, he interacted with individuals who had polio and collaborated closely with Cavendish's wife and son. Stephen Dalton of The Hollywood Reporter wrote that despite an exceptional story, the film had glossed over the complexities in Cavendish's life, and thought that Garfield was "hampered by a role that restricts him to little more than nodding and grinning". In March 2018, Garfield reprised the role of Prior when the Angels in America production transferred to Broadway for an eighteen-week limited engagement at the Neil Simon Theatre, alongside a majority of the London cast. Reviewing the production for The Washington Post, Peter Marks remarked that "nothing [Garfield's] done prepares you for the star-powered dexterity of his Prior" and considered his performance to be the "persuasive moral core of the piece". He won the Tony Award for Best Actor in a Play for his performance.

The 2018 Cannes Film Festival marked the premiere of Garfield's next film, the David Robert Mitchell-directed neo-noir Under the Silver Lake. In it, he played Sam, an unemployed and wayward young man who sets out on a journey to find his neighbour who has mysteriously disappeared. Writing for Vanity Fair, Richard Lawson found Garfield to be "great in the role, doing nimble, subtle bits of physical comedy and teasing out the creepy, menacing side of Sam". Garfield starred in Gia Coppola's drama Mainstream, alongside Maya Hawke and Jason Schwartzman, which had its world premiere at the 2020 Venice Film Festival.

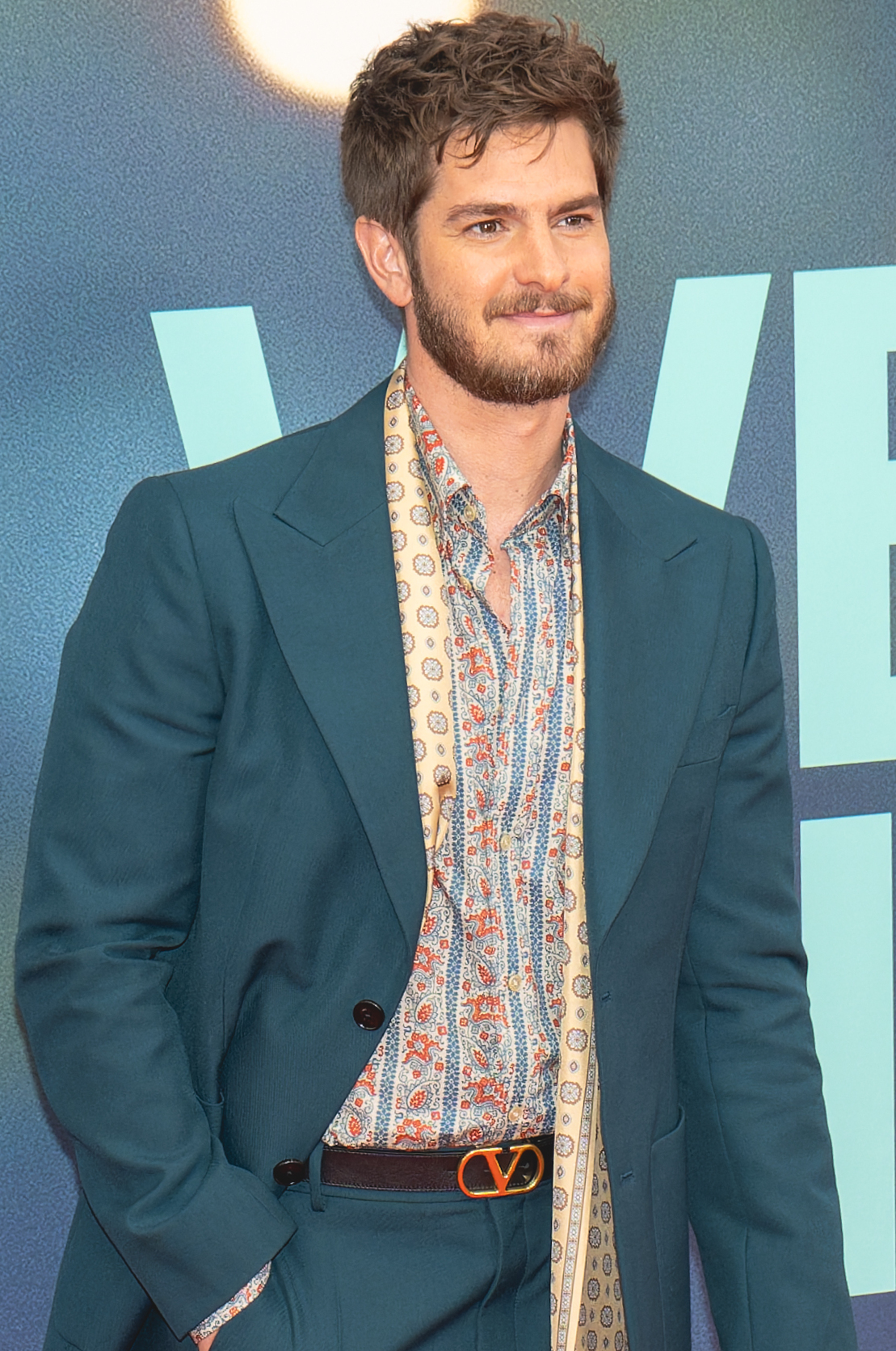
Garfield in 2024

In 2021, Garfield starred in The Eyes of Tammy Faye opposite Jessica Chastain, a drama about the televangelists Tammy Faye and Jim Bakker, which had its world premiere at the 2021 Toronto International Film Festival. That same year, Garfield portrayed composer Jonathan Larson in Lin-Manuel Miranda's film adaptation of Tick, Tick... Boom!. Miranda had first seen Garfield performing on stage in Angels in America. Garfield, who had not professionally sung before, underwent vocal training in preparation for the role. The film was released on Netflix. For his performance, Garfield received the Golden Globe Award for Best Actor in a Motion Picture – Musical or Comedy, and a nomination for the Academy Award for Best Actor. Despite issuing repeated public denials to the contrary, Garfield reprised his role as Spider-Man in the Marvel Cinematic Universe film Spider-Man: No Way Home, starring alongside his Spider-Man successor Tom Holland and predecessor Tobey Maguire. Garfield described his experience working on the film as "joyful", and said that it gave him "closure" with his version of the Spider-Man character. He also said that he would be open to reprising the role in future if it felt right.

In 2022, Garfield was included on Time magazine's annual list of 100 most influential people in the world. That same year, he starred in Dustin Lance Black's miniseries Under the Banner of Heaven, an adaptation of Jon Krakauer's book of the same name. Reviewing the miniseries, Vulture's Kathryn VanArendonk highlighted Garfield's "almost flagrantly tender portrayal" of Jeb Pyre, a Mormon detective. His performance earned him a Primetime Emmy Award nomination for Outstanding Lead Actor in a Limited or Anthology Series or Movie. In 2024, Garfield starred opposite Florence Pugh in John Crowley's romance We Live in Time. The next year he starred with Julia Roberts in Luca Guadagnino's thriller After the Hunt. In 2026, he starred in The Magic Faraway Tree, a family film based on Enid Blyton's book series of the same name. In May 2025, he was cast to play Roy Horn of Siegfried & Roy in the Apple TV+ miniseries Wild Things. He will reunite with Guadagnino for Artificial, portraying OpenAI CEO Sam Altman.

== Philanthropy ==
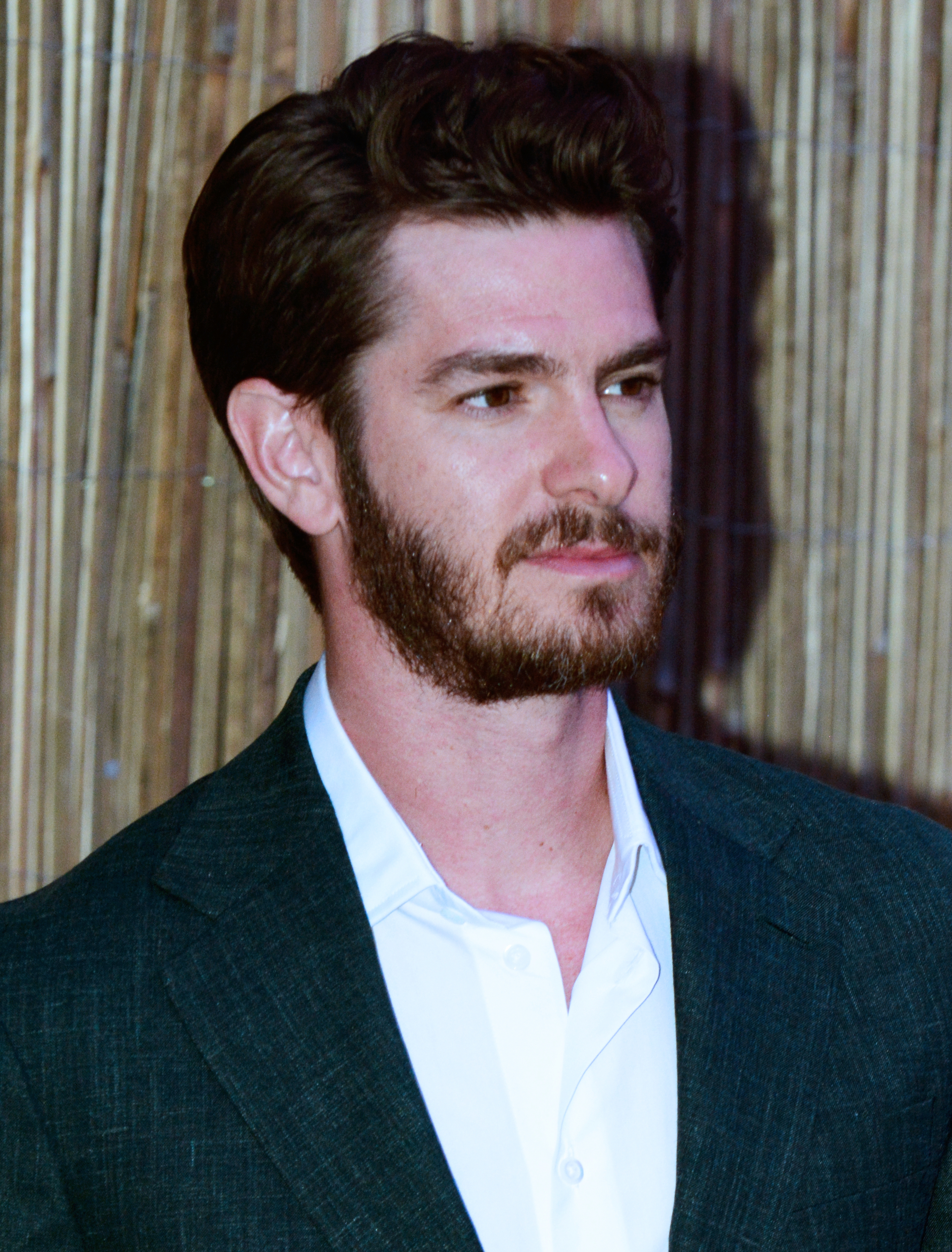
Garfield in 2023

In 2011, Garfield became the ambassador of sport for the Worldwide Orphans Foundation. He has traveled to countries like Haiti and Ethiopia to work directly with the charity's programs, which focus on medical, developmental, and sports-based integration. He has participated in mental health initiatives, such as the Child Mind Institute's campaign, which provides resources and support for families. During the peak of the COVID-19 pandemic. Garfield has publicly supported and raised awareness for SurvivorsUK, an organization dedicated to providing support for male victims and survivors of rape or sexual abuse.

Garfield has publicly expressed support for Palestine and the lives of Palestinians, urging people to focus on those suffering in the Gaza Strip. In a conversation on the crisis, he stated "Maybe the lives of Palestinians in Gaza right now is where our hearts and energy should be directed". In October 2023, Garfield was a signatory in an open letter by Artists4Ceasefire to President Joe Biden, calling for a ceasefire in the Gaza war. Garfield has often criticised the capitalist system and consumerism.

== Media image and reception ==
Having studied at the RCSSD, Garfield builds his performances on script analysis and a technical understanding of the character. Garfield is considered one of the most versatile and emotionally committed actors of his generation. He is celebrated for his intense dedication to method acting.

People included him in its "Men of the Year" list in both 2024 In 2023, GQ and Glamour named him the "Best Dressed Man" of 2010, with the former praising his sophisticated, retro-inspired tailoring and daring color choices. In 2013, Forbes featured Garfield in the "Top Grossing Actors" list, citing his $752 million. In 2022, Time named him one of the 100 most influential people in the world.

== Personal life ==
Garfield has referred to himself as an "agnostic pantheist", although he identifies as Jewish. Having completed the Spiritual Exercises of Ignatius of Loyola in preparation for playing a Jesuit in Silence, he said that "what was really easy was falling in love with this person, was falling in love with Jesus Christ. That was the most surprising thing."

Garfield holds dual citizenship in the United States and the United Kingdom. In 2009, he told the Sunday Herald that he felt "equally at home" in both countries and enjoyed "a varied cultural existence". When asked again in 2019, he stated, "I identify more as Jewish than anything... I have a love-hate relationship with both countries and used to be very proud to have both passports. Today, I'm slightly less proud." Garfield's primary place of residence is in North London near Hampstead Heath. He told Shaun Keaveny on a podcast in 2021 that he considers England home as that is where his family and friends are. He is a fan of basketball, having attended New York Knicks games at Madison Square Garden.

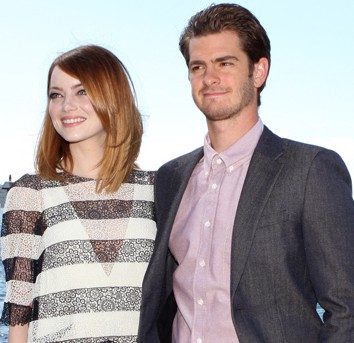
Garfield and Emma Stone in 2014

Garfield customarily gives interviews about his work but does not publicly discuss details of his private life. In 2011, Garfield began dating his The Amazing Spider-Man co-star Emma Stone sometime during production of the film. In 2015, they were rumoured to have broken up although no formal statement was released. When asked about his sexuality, Garfield identified himself as heterosexual, but has stated, "I have an openness to any impulses that may arise within me at any time." Since early 2025, Garfield has been in a relationship with actress Monica Barbaro.

Garfield's mother, Lynn, died of pancreatic cancer while he was filming The Eyes of Tammy Faye and shortly before Tick, Tick... Boom! began production. He was able to fly home to be with her. In 2021 he spoke about his grief on The Late Show with Stephen Colbert. He discussed it again in 2024 in an interview with Anderson Cooper on CNN, as well as with Elmo in an episode of Sesame Street.

== Acting credits ==
Key
†	Denotes films that have not yet been released

=== Films ===
Year	Title	Role	Notes	Ref.
2007	Lions for Lambs	Todd Hayes		
2008	The Other Boleyn Girl	Francis Weston	Scenes cut; credit only	
2009	The Imaginarium of Doctor Parnassus	Anton		
2010	I'm Here	Sheldon	Short film	
2010	Never Let Me Go	Tommy D		
2010	The Social Network	Eduardo Saverin		
2012	The Amazing Spider-Man	Peter Parker / Spider-Man		
2014	The Amazing Spider-Man 2	Peter Parker / Spider-Man		
2014	99 Homes	Dennis Nash		
2016	Hacksaw Ridge	Desmond Doss		
2016	Silence	Sebastião Rodrigues		
2017	Breathe	Robin Cavendish		
2018	Under the Silver Lake	Sam		
2020	Mainstream	Link	Also producer	
2021	The Eyes of Tammy Faye	Jim Bakker		
2021	Tick, Tick... Boom!	Jonathan Larson		
2021	Spider-Man: No Way Home	Peter Parker / Spider-Man		
2023	Spider-Man: Across the Spider-Verse	Peter Parker / Spider-Man	Cameo; Archive footage	
2024	We Live in Time	Tobias Durand		
2025	After the Hunt	Henrik "Hank" Gibson		
2026	The Magic Faraway Tree	Tim Thompson		
2026	The Uprising	Ploughman		
2026	Artificial	Sam Altman		

=== Television ===
Year	Title	Role	Notes	Ref.
2005	Sugar Rush	Tom	5 episodes	
2006	Simon Schama's Power of Art	Boy with fruit	Episode: "Caravaggio"	
2007	Trial & Retribution	Martin Douglas	1 episode	
2007	Doctor Who	Frank	Episodes: "Daleks in Manhattan", "Evolution of the Daleks"	
2007	Boy A	Jack Burridge	Television film	
2009	Freezing	Kit	1 episode	
2009	Red Riding	Eddie Dunford	3 episodes	
2011, 2014	Saturday Night Live	Himself (host)	2 episodes	
2019	RuPaul's Drag Race UK	Himself (guest judge)	Series 1; 1 episode	
2022	Under the Banner of Heaven	Detective Jeb Pyre	Miniseries, 7 episodes	
2025	Who Do You Think You Are?	Himself	Series 22, episode 1	
2027	Wild Things †	Roy Horn	Upcoming miniseries, also executive producer	

=== Theatre ===
Year	Title	Role	Venue	Ref.
2004	Mercy	Deccy	Soho Theatre, London	
2004	Kes	Billy	Royal Exchange, Manchester	
2005	The Laramie Project	Various characters	Sound Theatre, London	
2005	Romeo & Juliet	Romeo Montague	Royal Exchange, Manchester	
2006	Beautiful Thing	Jamie	Sound Theatre, London	
2006	Burn / Chatroom / Citizenship	Birdman / Jim / Stephen	Royal National Theatre, London	
2006	The Overwhelming	Geoffrey	Royal National Theatre, London	
2012	Death of a Salesman	Biff Loman	Ethel Barrymore Theatre, Broadway	
2017	The Children's Monologues	Teenager bullied by father	Carnegie Hall, New York	
2017	Angels in America	Prior Walter	Royal National Theatre, London	
2018	Angels in America	Prior Walter	Neil Simon Theatre, Broadway	

== Discography ==
List of guest appearances, with year released and album name shown
Title	Year	Album	Ref.
"30/90" (with Joshua Henry, Vanessa Hudgens, Robin de Jesús, Alexandra Shipp and Mj Rodriguez)	2021	Tick, Tick... Boom! (Soundtrack from the Netflix Film)	
"Boho Days" (with Joshua Henry, Vanessa Hudgens, Robin de Jesús, and Alexandra Shipp)	2021	Tick, Tick... Boom! (Soundtrack from the Netflix Film)	
"No More" (with Robin de Jesús)	2021	Tick, Tick... Boom! (Soundtrack from the Netflix Film)	
"Johnny Can't Decide" (with Joshua Henry and Vanessa Hudgens)	2021	Tick, Tick... Boom! (Soundtrack from the Netflix Film)	
"Sunday" (with the Moondance Diner Ensemble)	2021	Tick, Tick... Boom! (Soundtrack from the Netflix Film)	
"Therapy" (with Vanessa Hudgens)	2021	Tick, Tick... Boom! (Soundtrack from the Netflix Film)	
"Swimming" (with Joshua Henry and Vanessa Hudgens)	2021	Tick, Tick... Boom! (Soundtrack from the Netflix Film)	
"Why"	2021	Tick, Tick... Boom! (Soundtrack from the Netflix Film)	
"Louder Than Words" (with Joshua Henry and Vanessa Hudgens)	2021	Tick, Tick... Boom! (Soundtrack from the Netflix Film)	
"Green Green Dress" (with Alexandra Shipp)	2021	Tick, Tick... Boom! (Soundtrack from the Netflix Film)	

== See also ==
- Pritha garfieldi, a spider named after Garfield
