= Daxue (solar term) =

Twenty-first solar term of traditional East Asian calendars

Chinese name
- Chinese: 大雪
- Literal meaning: major snow
Transcriptions
Standard Mandarin
- Hanyu Pinyin: dàxuě
- Bopomofo: ㄉㄚˋ ㄒㄩㄝˇ
Hakka
- Pha̍k-fa-sṳ: Thai-siet
Yue: Cantonese
- Yale Romanization: daaih syut
- Jyutping: daai^{6} syut^{3}
Southern Min
- Hokkien POJ: Tāi-soat
Eastern Min
- Fuzhou BUC: Duâi-siók
Northern Min
- Jian'ou Romanized: Duōi-sṳĕ

Vietnamese name
- Vietnamese alphabet: đại tuyết
- Chữ Hán: 大雪

Korean name
- Hangul: 대설
- Hanja: 大雪
Transcriptions
- Revised Romanization: daeseol

Mongolian name
- Mongolian Cyrillic: их цас
- Mongolian script: ᠶᠡᠬᠡ ᠴᠠᠰᠤ

Japanese name
- Kanji: 大雪
- Hiragana: たいせつ
Transcriptions
- Romanization: taisetsu

Manchu name
- Manchu script: ᠠᠮᠪᠠ ᠨᡳᠮᠠᠩᡤᡳ
- Möllendorff: amba nimanggi

Solar term
Term	Longitude	Dates
Lichun	315°	4–5 February
Yushui	330°	18–19 February
Jingzhe	345°	5–6 March
Chunfen	0°	20–21 March
Qingming	15°	4–5 April
Guyu	30°	20–21 April
Lixia	45°	5–6 May
Xiaoman	60°	21–22 May
Mangzhong	75°	5–6 June
Xiazhi	90°	21–22 June
Xiaoshu	105°	7–8 July
Dashu	120°	22–23 July
Liqiu	135°	7–8 August
Chushu	150°	23–24 August
Bailu	165°	7–8 September
Qiufen	180°	23–24 September
Hanlu	195°	8–9 October
Shuangjiang	210°	23–24 October
Lidong	225°	7–8 November
Xiaoxue	240°	22–23 November
Daxue	255°	7–8 December
Dongzhi	270°	21–22 December
Xiaohan	285°	5–6 January
Dahan	300°	20–21 January

The traditional Chinese lunisolar calendar divides a year into 24 solar terms. Dàxuě (Chinese: 大雪; pinyin: dàxuě) is the 21st solar term. It begins when the Sun reaches the celestial longitude of 255° and ends when it reaches the longitude of 270°. It more often refers in particular to the day when the Sun is exactly at the celestial longitude of 255°. In the Gregorian calendar, it usually begins around 7 December and ends around 21 December (22 December East Asia time).

== Pentads ==
- 鶡旦不鳴, 'The jie-bird ceases to crow': the jie is a bird, similar to the pheasant, which is believed to be aggressive and combatant. As winter progresses, even this active bird slows and ceases to crow.
- 虎始交, 'Tigers begin to mate'
- 荔挺生, 'The litchi plant (tree) starts to germinate.'

== Date and time ==
Date and Time of Daxue (at UTC+08)
Year	Begin	End
丙申	2016-12-07 00:41	2016-12-21 18:44
丁酉	2017-12-07 06:32	2017-12-22 00:28
戊戌	2018-12-07 12:25	2018-12-22 06:22
己亥	2019-12-07 18:18	2019-12-22 12:19
庚子	2020-12-07 00:09	2020-12-21 18:02
辛丑	2021-12-07 05:57	2021-12-21 23:59
壬寅	2022-12-07 11:46	2022-12-22 05:48
癸卯	2023-12-07 17:33	2023-12-22 11:27
甲辰	2024-12-06 23:17	2024-12-21 17:20
乙巳	2025-12-07 05:04	2025-12-21 23:03
丙午	2026-12-07 10:52	2026-12-22 04:50
丁未	2027-12-07 16:37	2027-12-22 10:42
戊申	2028-12-06 22:24	2028-12-21 16:20
己酉	2029-12-07 04:14	2029-12-21 22:14
庚戌	2030-12-07 10:07	2030-12-22 04:09
辛亥	2031-12-07 16:03	2031-12-22 09:55
壬子	2032-12-06 21:53	2032-12-21 15:56
癸丑	2033-12-07 03:44	2033-12-21 21:45
甲寅	2034-12-07 09:36	2034-12-22 03:33
乙卯	2035-12-07 15:25	2035-12-22 09:30
丙辰	2036-12-06 21:15	2036-12-21 15:12

Preceded by Xiaoxue (小雪)	Solar term (節氣)	Succeeded by Dongzhi (冬至)
