= Chushu =

Solar term used in East Asian calendars to signify the end of summer

Chinese name
- Traditional Chinese: 處暑
- Simplified Chinese: 处暑
- Literal meaning: limit of heat
Transcriptions
Standard Mandarin
- Hanyu Pinyin: chǔshǔ
- Bopomofo: ㄔㄨˇ ㄕㄨˇ
Hakka
- Pha̍k-fa-sṳ: Chhú-chhú
Yue: Cantonese
- Yale Romanization: chyu syu
- Jyutping: cyu^{3} syu^{3}
Southern Min
- Hokkien POJ: Chhù-sú / Chhìr-sír / Chhì-sí
Eastern Min
- Fuzhou BUC: Chṳ̄-sṳ̄ / Ché̤ṳ-sṳ̄
Northern Min
- Jian'ou Romanized: Chṳ̿-sṳ̿

Vietnamese name
- Vietnamese alphabet: xử thử
- Chữ Hán: 處暑

Korean name
- Hangul: 처서
- Hanja: 處暑
Transcriptions
- Revised Romanization: cheoseo

Mongolian name
- Mongolian Cyrillic: халуун эгэх
- Mongolian script: ᠬᠠᠯᠠᠭᠤᠨ ᠡᠭᠡᠬᠦ

Japanese name
- Kanji: 処暑
- Hiragana: しょしょ
Transcriptions
- Romanization: shosho

Manchu name
- Manchu script: ᡥᠠᠯᡥᡡᠨ ᠪᡝᡩᡝᡵᡝᠮᠪᡳ
- Möllendorff: halhūn bederembi

Solar term
Term	Longitude	Dates
Lichun	315°	4–5 February
Yushui	330°	18–19 February
Jingzhe	345°	5–6 March
Chunfen	0°	20–21 March
Qingming	15°	4–5 April
Guyu	30°	20–21 April
Lixia	45°	5–6 May
Xiaoman	60°	21–22 May
Mangzhong	75°	5–6 June
Xiazhi	90°	21–22 June
Xiaoshu	105°	7–8 July
Dashu	120°	22–23 July
Liqiu	135°	7–8 August
Chushu	150°	23–24 August
Bailu	165°	7–8 September
Qiufen	180°	23–24 September
Hanlu	195°	8–9 October
Shuangjiang	210°	23–24 October
Lidong	225°	7–8 November
Xiaoxue	240°	22–23 November
Daxue	255°	7–8 December
Dongzhi	270°	21–22 December
Xiaohan	285°	5–6 January
Dahan	300°	20–21 January

The traditional Chinese calendar divides a year into 24 solar terms. Chǔshǔ, Shosho, Cheoseo, or Xử thử (traditional Chinese: 處暑; simplified Chinese: 处暑; pinyin: chǔshǔ; Japanese: 処暑; rōmaji: shosho; Korean: 처서; romaja: cheoseo; Vietnamese: xử thử; lit. 'limit of heat') is the 14th solar term that signifies the end of the hot summer season. It begins when the Sun reaches the celestial longitude of 150° and ends when it reaches the longitude of 165°. It more often refers in particular to the day when the Sun is exactly at the celestial longitude of 150°. In the Gregorian calendar, it usually begins around 23 August and ends around 7 September.

== Pentads ==
- 鷹乃祭鳥, 'Eagles worship the Birds'
- 天地始肅, 'Heaven and Earth begin to Withdraw', alluding to the end of summer
- 禾乃登, 'Grains become Ripe'

== Date and time ==
Date and Time of Chushu (at UTC+08)
Year	Begin	End
丙申	2016-08-23 00:38	2016-09-07 12:51
丁酉	2017-08-23 06:20	2017-09-07 18:38
戊戌	2018-08-23 12:08	2018-09-08 00:29
己亥	2019-08-23 18:02	2019-09-08 06:16
庚子	2020-08-22 23:45	2020-09-07 12:08
辛丑	2021-08-23 05:35	2021-09-07 17:53
壬寅	2022-08-23 11:16	2022-09-07 23:32
癸卯	2023-08-23 17:01	2023-09-08 05:27
甲辰	2024-08-22 22:55	2024-09-07 11:11
乙巳	2025-08-23 04:34	2025-09-07 16:52
丙午	2026-08-23 10:18	2026-09-07 22:41
丁未	2027-08-23 16:14	2027-09-08 04:28
戊申	2028-08-22 22:01	2028-09-07 10:22
己酉	2029-08-23 03:51	2029-09-07 16:11
庚戌	2030-08-23 09:36	2030-09-07 21:53
辛亥	2031-08-23 15:23	2031-09-08 03:50
壬子	2032-08-22 21:18	2032-09-07 09:38
癸丑	2033-08-23 03:02	2033-09-07 15:20
甲寅	2034-08-23 08:47	2034-09-07 21:14
乙卯	2035-08-23 14:44	2035-09-08 03:02
丙辰	2036-08-22 20:32	2036-09-07 08:55

Preceded by Liqiu (立秋)	Solar term (節氣)	Succeeded by Bailu (白露)
