= Qiufen =

Sixteenth solar term of traditional East Asian calendars

Chinese name
- Chinese: 秋分
- Literal meaning: autumn/fall equinox
Transcriptions
Standard Mandarin
- Hanyu Pinyin: qiūfēn
- Bopomofo: ㄑㄧㄡ ㄈㄣ
Hakka
- Pha̍k-fa-sṳ: Chhiû-fûn
Yue: Cantonese
- Yale Romanization: chāu fān
- Jyutping: cau^{1} fan^{1}
Southern Min
- Hokkien POJ: Chhiu-hun
Eastern Min
- Fuzhou BUC: Chiŭ-hŭng
Northern Min
- Jian'ou Romanized: Chiú-hóng

Vietnamese name
- Vietnamese alphabet: thu phân
- Chữ Hán: 秋分

Korean name
- Hangul: 추분
- Hanja: 秋分
Transcriptions
- Revised Romanization: chubun

Mongolian name
- Mongolian Cyrillic: намрын хугас
- Mongolian script: ᠨᠠᠮᠤᠷ ᠤᠨ ᠬᠤᠭᠤᠰ

Japanese name
- Kanji: 秋分
- Hiragana: しゅうぶん
Transcriptions
- Romanization: shūbun

Manchu name
- Manchu script: ᠪᠣᠯᠣᡵᡳ ᡩᡠᠯᡳᠨ
- Möllendorff: bolori dulin

Solar term
Term	Longitude	Dates
Lichun	315°	4–5 February
Yushui	330°	18–19 February
Jingzhe	345°	5–6 March
Chunfen	0°	20–21 March
Qingming	15°	4–5 April
Guyu	30°	20–21 April
Lixia	45°	5–6 May
Xiaoman	60°	21–22 May
Mangzhong	75°	5–6 June
Xiazhi	90°	21–22 June
Xiaoshu	105°	7–8 July
Dashu	120°	22–23 July
Liqiu	135°	7–8 August
Chushu	150°	23–24 August
Bailu	165°	7–8 September
Qiufen	180°	23–24 September
Hanlu	195°	8–9 October
Shuangjiang	210°	23–24 October
Lidong	225°	7–8 November
Xiaoxue	240°	22–23 November
Daxue	255°	7–8 December
Dongzhi	270°	21–22 December
Xiaohan	285°	5–6 January
Dahan	300°	20–21 January

The traditional Chinese lunisolar calendar divides a year into 24 solar terms. Qiūfēn, Shūbun, Chubun, or Thu phân is the 16th solar term. It begins when the Sun reaches the celestial longitude of 180° and ends when it reaches the longitude of 195°. It more often refers in particular to the day when the Sun is exactly at the celestial longitude of 180°. In the Gregorian calendar, it usually begins around September 23 and ends around October 8.

== Pentads ==
- 雷始收聲, 'Thunder begins to soften'
- 蟄蟲培戶, 'Insects make nests'
- 水始涸, 'Water begins to solidify'

== Date and time ==
Date and Time of Qiufen (at UTC+08)
Year	Begin	End
丙申	2016-09-22 22:21	2016-10-08 04:33
丁酉	2017-09-23 04:01	2017-10-08 10:21
戊戌	2018-09-23 09:54	2018-10-08 16:14
己亥	2019-09-23 15:50	2019-10-08 22:05
庚子	2020-09-22 21:30	2020-10-08 03:55
辛丑	2021-09-23 03:21	2021-10-08 09:39
壬寅	2022-09-23 09:04	2022-10-08 15:22
癸卯	2023-09-23 14:50	2023-10-08 21:16
甲辰	2024-09-22 20:43	2024-10-08 03:00
乙巳	2025-09-23 02:19	2025-10-08 08:41
丙午	2026-09-23 08:05	2026-10-08 14:29
丁未	2027-09-23 14:01	2027-10-08 20:17
戊申	2028-09-22 19:45	2028-10-08 02:08
己酉	2029-09-23 01:38	2029-10-08 07:57
庚戌	2030-09-23 07:27	2030-10-08 13:45
辛亥	2031-09-23 13:15	2031-10-08 19:43
壬子	2032-09-22 19:10	2032-10-08 01:30
癸丑	2033-09-23 00:52	2033-10-08 07:14
甲寅	2034-09-23 06:39	2034-10-08 13:07
乙卯	2035-09-23 12:39	2035-10-08 18:57
丙辰	2036-09-22 18:23	2036-10-08 00:49

== See also ==
- Equinox

Preceded by Bailu (白露)	Solar term (節氣)	Succeeded by Hanlu (寒露)
