= Boshu =

Boshu or Bōshū may refer to:

- Boshu
  - Mangzhong, Asian calendar term
  - A kind of Chinese book written on silk (bo)
- Bōshū (房州)
  - Bōshū, another name for Awa Province.
- Bōshū (防州)
  - Bōshū, another name for Suō Province.
