= Chunfen =

Fourth solar term of traditional East Asian calendars

Chinese name
- Chinese: 春分
- Literal meaning: spring equinox
Transcriptions
Standard Mandarin
- Hanyu Pinyin: chūnfēn
- Bopomofo: ㄔㄨㄣ ㄈㄣ
Hakka
- Pha̍k-fa-sṳ: Chhûn-fûn
Yue: Cantonese
- Yale Romanization: chēun fān
- Jyutping: ceon^{1} fan^{1}
Southern Min
- Hokkien POJ: Chhun-hun
- Tâi-lô: tshun-hun
Eastern Min
- Fuzhou BUC: Chŭng-*hŭng
Northern Min
- Jian'ou Romanized: Ché̤ng-hóng

Vietnamese name
- Vietnamese alphabet: xuân phân
- Chữ Hán: 春分

Korean name
- Hangul: 춘분
- Hanja: 春分
Transcriptions
- Revised Romanization: chunbun

Mongolian name
- Mongolian Cyrillic: хаврын хугас
- Mongolian script: ᠬᠠᠪᠤᠷ ᠤᠨ ᠬᠤᠭᠤᠰ

Japanese name
- Kanji: 春分
- Hiragana: しゅんぶん
Transcriptions
- Romanization: shunbun

Manchu name
- Manchu script: ᠨᡳᠶᡝᠩᠨᡳᠶᡝᡵᡳ ᡩᡠᠯᡳᠨ
- Möllendorff: niyengniyeri dulin

Solar term
Term	Longitude	Dates
Lichun	315°	4–5 February
Yushui	330°	18–19 February
Jingzhe	345°	5–6 March
Chunfen	0°	20–21 March
Qingming	15°	4–5 April
Guyu	30°	20–21 April
Lixia	45°	5–6 May
Xiaoman	60°	21–22 May
Mangzhong	75°	5–6 June
Xiazhi	90°	21–22 June
Xiaoshu	105°	7–8 July
Dashu	120°	22–23 July
Liqiu	135°	7–8 August
Chushu	150°	23–24 August
Bailu	165°	7–8 September
Qiufen	180°	23–24 September
Hanlu	195°	8–9 October
Shuangjiang	210°	23–24 October
Lidong	225°	7–8 November
Xiaoxue	240°	22–23 November
Daxue	255°	7–8 December
Dongzhi	270°	21–22 December
Xiaohan	285°	5–6 January
Dahan	300°	20–21 January

The traditional Chinese calendar divides a year into 24 solar terms. Chūnfēn, Shunbun, Chunbun, or Xuân phân is the 4th solar term. It begins when the Sun reaches the celestial longitude of 0° and ends when it reaches the longitude of 15°. In the Gregorian calendar, it usually begins around 20 March and ends around 4 April (5 April East Asia time). It more often refers in particular to the day when the Sun is exactly at the celestial longitude of 0°.

== Pentads ==
Each solar term can be divided into 3 pentads (候). They are: first pentad (初候), second pentad (次候) and last pentad (末候). Pentads in Chunfen include:

=== China ===
- First pentad: 玄鳥至, 'The dark birds arrive'. 'Dark bird' in this case refers to swallows, which are also making their northward migration, or the Xuanniao.
- Second pentad: 雷乃發聲, 'Thunder sounds', referring to the onset of spring thunderstorms.
- Last pentad: 始電, 'Lightning starts'. This refers to thunderstorms as well, but also to the gradual lengthening of daytime, and the prevalence of sunlight.

=== Japan ===
A pentad as follows was referred to Japanese traditional calendar presented in a smaller, easy to use, format.

- First pentad: Suzume hajimete sukuu (雀始巣), 'Sparrow begins holding a nest'.
- Second pentad: Sakura hajimete hiraku (桜始開), 'Cherry blossoms open for the first time'.
- Last pentad: Kaminari sunawachi koeo hassu (雷乃発声), 'Distant thunder start to sound'.

== Date and time ==
Date and Time of Chunfen (at UTC+08)
Year	Begin	End
丙申	2016-03-20 12:30	2016-04-04 16:27
丁酉	2017-03-20 18:28	2017-04-04 22:17
戊戌	2018-03-21 00:15	2018-04-05 04:12
己亥	2019-03-21 05:58	2019-04-05 09:51
庚子	2020-03-20 11:50	2020-04-04 15:38
辛丑	2021-03-20 17:37	2021-04-04 21:35
壬寅	2022-03-20 23:33	2022-04-05 03:20
癸卯	2023-03-21 05:24	2023-04-05 09:13
甲辰	2024-03-20 11:06	2024-04-04 15:02
乙巳	2025-03-20 17:01	2025-04-04 20:48
丙午	2026-03-20 22:45	2026-04-05 02:39
丁未	2027-03-21 04:25	2027-04-05 08:17
戊申	2028-03-20 10:17	2028-04-04 14:03
己酉	2029-03-20 16:01	2029-04-04 19:58
庚戌	2030-03-20 21:51	2030-04-05 01:40
辛亥	2031-03-21 03:41	2031-04-05 07:28
壬子	2032-03-20 09:22	2032-04-04 13:17
癸丑	2033-03-20 15:23	2033-04-04 19:08
甲寅	2034-03-20 21:17	2034-04-05 01:06
乙卯	2035-03-21 03:03	2035-04-05 06:54
丙辰	2036-03-20 09:02	2036-04-04 12:46

== See also ==
- Equinox

Preceded by Jingzhe (驚蟄)	Solar term (節氣)	Succeeded by Qingming (清明)
