= Dahan (solar term) =

24th term of the traditional Chinese calendar

Chinese name
- Chinese: 大寒
- Literal meaning: major cold
Transcriptions
Standard Mandarin
- Hanyu Pinyin: dàhán
- Bopomofo: ㄉㄚˋ ㄏㄢˊ
Hakka
- Pha̍k-fa-sṳ: Thai-hòn
Yue: Cantonese
- Yale Romanization: daaih hòhn
- Jyutping: daai^{6} hon^{4}
Southern Min
- Hokkien POJ: Tāi-hân
Eastern Min
- Fuzhou BUC: Duâi-hàng
Northern Min
- Jian'ou Romanized: Duōi-uǐng

Vietnamese name
- Vietnamese alphabet: đại hàn
- Chữ Hán: 大寒

Korean name
- Hangul: 대한
- Hanja: 大寒
Transcriptions
- Revised Romanization: daehan

Mongolian name
- Mongolian Cyrillic: их хүйтэн
- Mongolian script: ᠶᠡᠬᠡ ᠬᠦᠢᠲᠡᠨ

Japanese name
- Kanji: 大寒
- Hiragana: だいかん
Transcriptions
- Romanization: daikan

Manchu name
- Manchu script: ᠠᠮᠪᠠ ᡧᠠᡥᡡᡵᡠᠨ
- Möllendorff: amba šahūrun

Solar term
Term	Longitude	Dates
Lichun	315°	4–5 February
Yushui	330°	18–19 February
Jingzhe	345°	5–6 March
Chunfen	0°	20–21 March
Qingming	15°	4–5 April
Guyu	30°	20–21 April
Lixia	45°	5–6 May
Xiaoman	60°	21–22 May
Mangzhong	75°	5–6 June
Xiazhi	90°	21–22 June
Xiaoshu	105°	7–8 July
Dashu	120°	22–23 July
Liqiu	135°	7–8 August
Chushu	150°	23–24 August
Bailu	165°	7–8 September
Qiufen	180°	23–24 September
Hanlu	195°	8–9 October
Shuangjiang	210°	23–24 October
Lidong	225°	7–8 November
Xiaoxue	240°	22–23 November
Daxue	255°	7–8 December
Dongzhi	270°	21–22 December
Xiaohan	285°	5–6 January
Dahan	300°	20–21 January

The traditional Chinese calendar divides a year into 24 solar terms. Dàhán, Daikan, Daehan, or Đại hàn (Chinese and Japanese: 大寒; pinyin: dàhán; rōmaji: daikan; Korean: 대한; romaja: daehan; Vietnamese: đại hàn; lit. 'major cold') is the 24th solar term. It begins when the Sun reaches the celestial longitude of 300° and ends when it reaches the longitude of 315°. It more often refers in particular to the day when the Sun is exactly at the celestial longitude of 300°. In the Gregorian calendar, Dahan usually begins around 20 January and ends around 4 February.

== Date and time ==
Date and Time of Dahan (at UTC+08)
Year	Begin	End
乙未	2016-01-20 23:27	2016-02-04 17:46
丙申	2017-01-20 05:23	2017-02-03 23:34
丁酉	2018-01-20 11:09	2018-02-04 05:28
戊戌	2019-01-20 16:59	2019-02-04 11:14
己亥	2020-01-20 22:54	2020-02-04 17:03
庚子	2021-01-20 04:40	2021-02-03 22:59
辛丑	2022-01-20 10:39	2022-02-04 04:50
壬寅	2023-01-20 16:29	2023-02-04 10:42
癸卯	2024-01-20 22:07	2024-02-04 16:26
甲辰	2025-01-20 04:00	2025-02-03 22:10
乙巳	2026-01-20 09:44	2026-02-04 04:02
丙午	2027-01-20 15:30	2027-02-04 09:46
丁未	2028-01-20 21:21	2028-02-04 15:31
戊申	2029-01-20 03:01	2029-02-03 21:20
己酉	2030-01-20 08:54	2030-02-04 03:08
庚戌	2031-01-20 14:48	2031-02-04 08:58
辛亥	2032-01-20 20:31	2032-02-04 14:49
壬子	2033-01-20 02:33	2033-02-03 20:42
癸丑	2034-01-20 08:27	2034-02-04 02:41
甲寅	2035-01-20 14:14	2035-02-04 08:31
乙卯	2036-01-20 20:10	2036-02-04 14:19

== Customs ==
There are many important folk customs during the period from Dahan to Lichun, such as getting rid of the old and bringing in the new, preserving meat, and the year-end festival.

Weiya (zh:做牙) is the year-end festival. Glutinous rice, steamed buns, and much alcohol are traditional foods. Getting a haircut and buying new year gifts are common activities at the end of the year. End of year work parties (年会) are a modern remnant of the year-end festival.

Some other traditional activities at this time of year:

- zh:扫尘 "dust removal", or cleaning the house to sweep away bad luck. Dust removal is usually done on the 23rd or 24th day of the twelfth lunar month.
- zh:糊窗 "Pasting windows". This was the traditional time to refresh paper windows. Some families would cut some auspicious patterns and paste them on the windows. It is usually done on the 25th day of the twelfth lunar month.
- zh:腊味 "preserve meat", this time of year is the driest in China, which is a good time of year to preserve meat.
- zh:赶婚 "Rush to get married". Being a break in the agricultural year, it was traditionally a good time for marriages.

Preceded by Xiaohan (小寒)	Solar term (節氣)	Succeeded by Lichun (立春)
