= Lichun =

First solar term of East Asian calendars

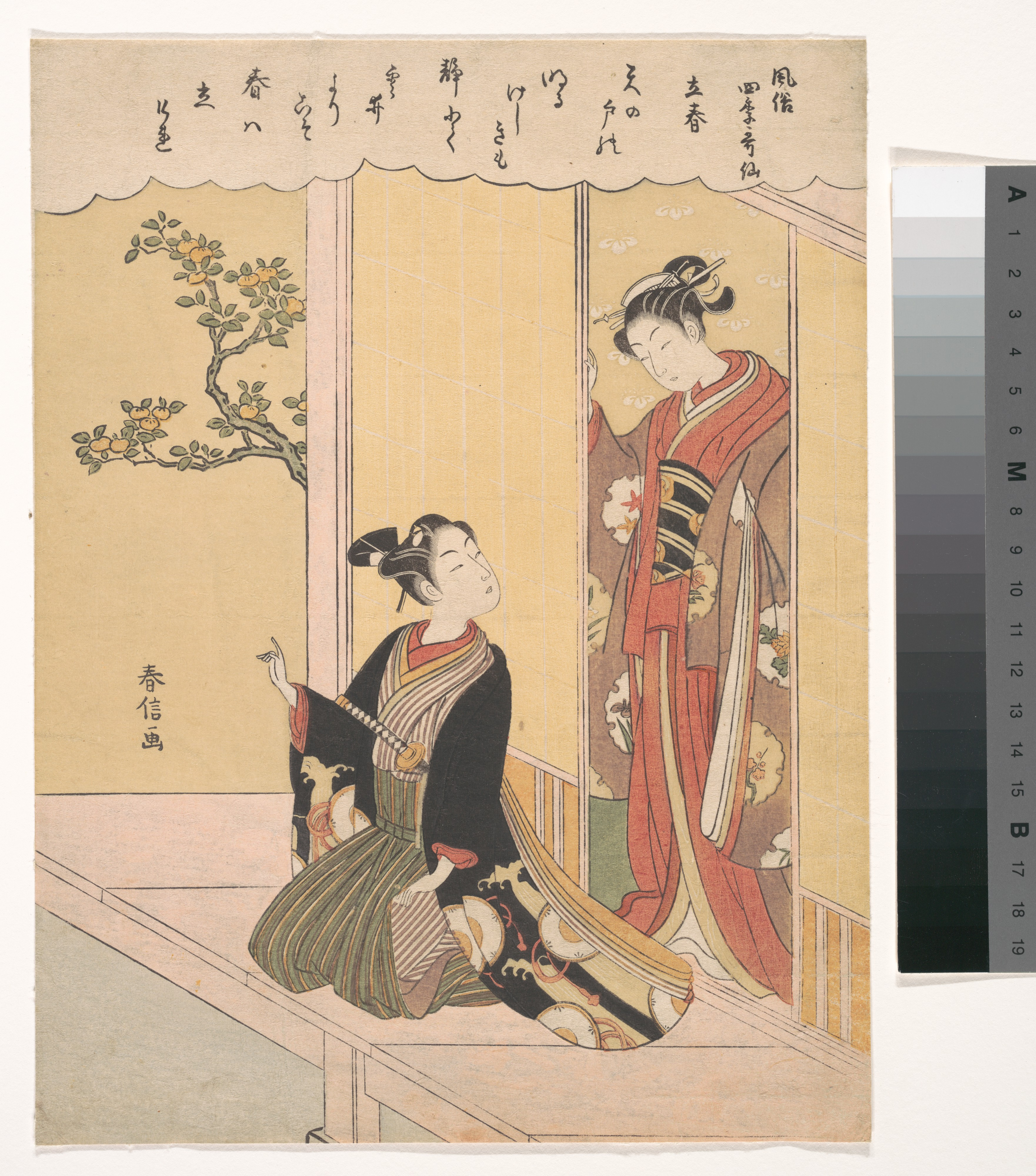
- Woodcut depicting Risshun (Suzuki Harunobu, c. 1768)

Chinese name
- Chinese: 立春
- Literal meaning: "establishment of spring"
Transcriptions
Standard Mandarin
- Hanyu Pinyin: lìchūn
- Bopomofo: ㄌㄧˋ ㄔㄨㄣ
- IPA: [lî.ʈʂʰwə́n]
Hakka
- Pha̍k-fa-sṳ: li̍p-chhûn
Yue: Cantonese
- Yale Romanization: laahpchēun
- Jyutping: laap^{6}-ceon^{1}
- IPA: [lap̚˨.tsʰɵn˥]
Southern Min
- Hokkien POJ: Li̍p-chhun
Eastern Min
- Fuzhou BUC: Lĭk-chŭng
Northern Min
- Jian'ou Romanized: Lì-ché̤ng

Vietnamese name
- Vietnamese alphabet: lập xuân
- Chữ Hán: 立春

North Korean name
- Chosŏn'gŭl: 립춘
- Hancha: 立春
Transcriptions
- Revised Romanization: Ripchun

South Korean name
- Hangul: 입춘
- Hanja: 立春
Transcriptions
- Revised Romanization: Ipchun

Mongolian name
- Mongolian Cyrillic: хаврын уур
- Mongolian script: ᠬᠠᠪᠤᠷ ᠤᠨ ᠠᠭᠤᠷ

Japanese name
- Kanji: 立春
- Hiragana: りっしゅん
- Katakana: リッシュン
Transcriptions
- Romanization: risshun

Manchu name
- Manchu script: ᠨᡳᠶᡝᠩᠨᡳᠶᡝᡵᡳ ᡩᠣᠰᡳᠮᠪᡳ
- Möllendorff: niyengniyeri dosimbi

Solar term
Term	Longitude	Dates
Lichun	315°	4–5 February
Yushui	330°	18–19 February
Jingzhe	345°	5–6 March
Chunfen	0°	20–21 March
Qingming	15°	4–5 April
Guyu	30°	20–21 April
Lixia	45°	5–6 May
Xiaoman	60°	21–22 May
Mangzhong	75°	5–6 June
Xiazhi	90°	21–22 June
Xiaoshu	105°	7–8 July
Dashu	120°	22–23 July
Liqiu	135°	7–8 August
Chushu	150°	23–24 August
Bailu	165°	7–8 September
Qiufen	180°	23–24 September
Hanlu	195°	8–9 October
Shuangjiang	210°	23–24 October
Lidong	225°	7–8 November
Xiaoxue	240°	22–23 November
Daxue	255°	7–8 December
Dongzhi	270°	21–22 December
Xiaohan	285°	5–6 January
Dahan	300°	20–21 January

The traditional Chinese calendar divides a year into 24 solar terms. The first one is known as lichun (立春) in Chinese, risshun in Japanese, ipchun in Korean, and lập xuân in Vietnamese. It begins when the Sun reaches the celestial longitude of 315° and ends when it reaches the longitude of 330°. It more often refers in particular to the day when the Sun is exactly at the celestial longitude of 315°. In the Gregorian calendar, it usually begins around February 4 and ends around February 18 (February 19 East Asia time). It is also the beginning of a sexagenary cycle.

Lichun signifies the beginning of spring in Chinese cultures.

== Pentads ==
Each solar term can be divided into 3 pentads (候). They are: first pentad (初候), second pentad (次候) and last pentad (末候). Pentads in Lichun include:

China

- First pentad: Dōng Fēng Jiě Dòng (traditional Chinese: 東風解凍; simplified Chinese: 东风解冻; lit. 'east wind thaw')
  Yuè Lìng Qī Shí Èr Hòu Jí Jiě (月令七十二候集解) explains the name of this pentad:
  It is not called the 'winter ice meets the spring wind and melts in the spring wind' thaw, but the 'east wind' thaw, because Lü Shi Chun Qiu said that the east is associated with wood, and wood generates fire, so the air is warm and causes ice to thaw. (凍結于冬遇春風而解散不曰春而曰東者呂氏春秋曰東方屬木木火母也然氣溫故解凍)
- Second pentad (traditional Chinese: 蟄蟲始振; simplified Chinese: 蛰虫始振; pinyin: zhé chóng shǐ zhèn; lit. 'hibernating insects awaken')
- Last pentad (traditional Chinese: 魚上冰; simplified Chinese: 鱼上冰; pinyin: yú shàng bīng; lit. 'fish swim upward near ice')

Japan

- First pentad: 東風解凍
- Second pentad: 黄鶯睍睆
- Last pentad: 魚上氷

== Date and time ==
Date and Time of Lichun (at UTC+08)
Year	Begin	End
丙申	2016-02-04 17:46	2016-02-19 13:33
丁酉	2017-02-03 23:34	2017-02-18 19:31
戊戌	2018-02-04 05:28	2018-02-19 01:18
己亥	2019-02-04 11:14	2019-02-19 07:04
庚子	2020-02-04 17:03	2020-02-19 12:57
辛丑	2021-02-03 22:59	2021-02-18 18:44
壬寅	2022-02-04 04:50	2022-02-19 00:43
癸卯	2023-02-04 10:42	2023-02-19 06:34
甲辰	2024-02-04 16:26	2024-02-19 12:13
乙巳	2025-02-03 22:10	2025-02-18 18:06
丙午	2026-02-04 04:02	2026-02-18 23:51
丁未	2027-02-04 09:46	2027-02-19 05:33
戊申	2028-02-04 15:31	2028-02-19 11:25
己酉	2029-02-03 21:20	2029-02-18 17:07
庚戌	2030-02-04 03:08	2030-02-18 23:00
辛亥	2031-02-04 08:58	2031-02-19 04:51
壬子	2032-02-04 14:49	2032-02-19 10:32
癸丑	2033-02-03 20:42	2033-02-18 16:34
甲寅	2034-02-04 02:41	2034-02-18 22:30
乙卯	2035-02-04 08:31	2035-02-19 04:16
丙辰	2036-02-04 14:19	2036-02-19 10:14

== Customs ==
=== Chinese culture ===
Lichun traditionally signifies the beginning of spring. Chinese New Year is celebrated around this time. Farmers often celebrate the beginning of Lichun with special village events, worship and offerings to the Taoist and Buddhist gods and ceremonies for a blissful and prosperous new year. People eat chūnbǐng (春餅) on this day, especially in northern China.

According to some schools of Feng Shui, if you are born after Chinese New Years but before or even on the first day of Lichun you are considered the zodiac animal of the previous Chinese lunar year.

In the lunisolar calendar, New Year's Day might be before or after Lichun. A year without Lichun is called 無春年 (no spring year). 無春年 is also known as 寡婦年 (widow year) in northern China or 盲年 (blind year) in southern China. Marriage is believed to be unlucky in a year without Lichun.

In the Republic of China (Taiwan), Lichun has been Farmer's Day since 1941.

In Singapore, there is a practice of depositing money into bank accounts on Lichun which many believe will bring them good fortune.

=== Korea ===
Ipchun is the first season of the new year, so there are many farming-related events.

In Ipchun, families, regardless of the city or countryside, put their writings on walls or thresholds as a blessing event.

These writings are also called Ipchunchuk, Chunchuk, Ipchunseo, Ipchunbang, and Chunbang.

Those who know the letters write themselves, and those who do not know how to write, ask others to write them.

It is said that it is good to attach it at the time of Ipchun, but it is not written in the house where the funeral is held.

== About ==
Lichun is mentioned in literature, including in Du Fu's (杜甫) shi (詩), simply titled Lìchūn (立春):

春日春盤細生菜
忽憶兩京梅發時
盤出高門行白玉
菜傳纖手送青絲
巫峽寒江那對眼
杜陵遠客不勝悲
此身未知歸定處
呼兒覓紙一題詩

Translation:

This poem tells us about the traditional custom of eating chūnbǐng (春餅) on this day.

== See also ==
- Setsubun (節分), the day before the beginning of each season, celebrated as winter changes to spring in Japan
- Egg of Li Chun
- Imbolc

Preceded by Dahan (大寒)	Solar term (節氣)	Succeeded by Yushui (雨水)
