= Hanlu =

Seventeenth solar term of traditional East Asian calendars

Chinese name
- Chinese: 寒露
- Literal meaning: cold dew
Transcriptions
Standard Mandarin
- Hanyu Pinyin: hánlù
- Bopomofo: ㄏㄢˊ ㄌㄨˋ
Hakka
- Pha̍k-fa-sṳ: Hòn-lu
Yue: Cantonese
- Yale Romanization: hòhn louh
- Jyutping: hon^{4} lou^{6}
Southern Min
- Hokkien POJ: Hân-lō͘
Eastern Min
- Fuzhou BUC: Hàng-ló
Northern Min
- Jian'ou Romanized: Uǐng-lū

Vietnamese name
- Vietnamese alphabet: hàn lộ
- Chữ Hán: 寒露

Korean name
- Hangul: 한로
- Hanja: 寒露
Transcriptions
- Revised Romanization: hallo

Mongolian name
- Mongolian Cyrillic: хүйтэн шүүдэр
- Mongolian script: ᠬᠦᠢᠲᠡᠨ ᠰᠢᠭᠦᠳᠡᠷᠢ

Japanese name
- Kanji: 寒露
- Hiragana: かんろ
Transcriptions
- Romanization: kanro

Manchu name
- Manchu script: ᡧᠠᡥᡡᡵᡠᠨ ᠰᡳᠯᡝᠩᡤᡳ
- Möllendorff: šahūrun silenggi

Solar term
| Term | Longitude | Dates |
|---|---|---|
| Lichun | 315° | 4–5 February |
| Yushui | 330° | 18–19 February |
| Jingzhe | 345° | 5–6 March |
| Chunfen | 0° | 20–21 March |
| Qingming | 15° | 4–5 April |
| Guyu | 30° | 20–21 April |
| Lixia | 45° | 5–6 May |
| Xiaoman | 60° | 21–22 May |
| Mangzhong | 75° | 5–6 June |
| Xiazhi | 90° | 21–22 June |
| Xiaoshu | 105° | 7–8 July |
| Dashu | 120° | 22–23 July |
| Liqiu | 135° | 7–8 August |
| Chushu | 150° | 23–24 August |
| Bailu | 165° | 7–8 September |
| Qiufen | 180° | 23–24 September |
| Hanlu | 195° | 8–9 October |
| Shuangjiang | 210° | 23–24 October |
| Lidong | 225° | 7–8 November |
| Xiaoxue | 240° | 22–23 November |
| Daxue | 255° | 7–8 December |
| Dongzhi | 270° | 21–22 December |
| Xiaohan | 285° | 5–6 January |
| Dahan | 300° | 20–21 January |

The traditional Chinese calendar divides a year into 24 solar terms (節氣). Hánlù, Kanro, Hallo, or Hàn lộ (Chinese and Japanese: 寒露; pinyin: hánlù; rōmaji: kanro; Korean: 한로; romaja: hallo; Vietnamese: hàn lộ; lit. 'cold dew') is the 17th solar term. It begins when the Sun reaches the celestial longitude of 195° and ends when it reaches the longitude of 210°. It more often refers in particular to the day when the Sun is exactly at the celestial longitude of 195°. In the Gregorian calendar, it usually begins around October 8 and ends around October 23.

== Pentads ==
- 鴻雁來賓, 'The guest geese arrive' – Geese which completed their migration in summer were considered 'hosts', and the later-flying ones as 'guests'. This pentad can also be interpreted as 'The geese arrive at the water's edge'.
- 雀入大水為蛤, 'The sparrows enter the ocean and become clams'
- 菊有黃華, 'Chrysanthemums bloom yellow' – the chrysanthemum is known as one of the few flowers to bloom in autumn.

== Date and time ==
Date and Time of Hanlu (at UTC+08)
| Year | Begin | End |
|---|---|---|
| 丙申 | 2016-10-08 04:33 | 2016-10-23 07:45 |
| 丁酉 | 2017-10-08 10:21 | 2017-10-23 13:26 |
| 戊戌 | 2018-10-08 16:14 | 2018-10-23 19:22 |
| 己亥 | 2019-10-08 22:05 | 2019-10-24 01:19 |
| 庚子 | 2020-10-08 03:55 | 2020-10-23 06:59 |
| 辛丑 | 2021-10-08 09:39 | 2021-10-23 12:51 |
| 壬寅 | 2022-10-08 15:22 | 2022-10-23 18:36 |
| 癸卯 | 2023-10-08 21:16 | 2023-10-24 00:21 |
| 甲辰 | 2024-10-08 03:00 | 2024-10-23 06:14 |
| 乙巳 | 2025-10-08 08:41 | 2025-10-23 11:51 |
| 丙午 | 2026-10-08 14:29 | 2026-10-23 17:38 |
| 丁未 | 2027-10-08 20:17 | 2027-10-23 23:32 |
| 戊申 | 2028-10-08 02:08 | 2028-10-23 05:13 |
| 己酉 | 2029-10-08 07:57 | 2029-10-23 11:07 |
| 庚戌 | 2030-10-08 13:45 | 2030-10-23 17:00 |
| 辛亥 | 2031-10-08 19:43 | 2031-10-23 22:49 |
| 壬子 | 2032-10-08 01:30 | 2032-10-23 04:46 |
| 癸丑 | 2033-10-08 07:14 | 2033-10-23 10:27 |
| 甲寅 | 2034-10-08 13:07 | 2034-10-23 16:16 |
| 乙卯 | 2035-10-08 18:57 | 2035-10-23 22:16 |
| 丙辰 | 2036-10-08 00:49 | 2036-10-23 03:59 |

| Preceded by Qiufen (秋分) | Solar term (節氣) | Succeeded by Shuangjiang (霜降) |
