= Xiaoxue =

Twentieth solar term of traditional East Asian calendars

Chinese name
- Chinese: 小雪
- Literal meaning: minor snow
Transcriptions
Standard Mandarin
- Hanyu Pinyin: xiǎoxuě
- Bopomofo: ㄒㄧㄠˇ ㄒㄩㄝˇ
Hakka
- Pha̍k-fa-sṳ: Séu-siet
Yue: Cantonese
- Yale Romanization: síu syut
- Jyutping: siu^{2} syut^{3}
Southern Min
- Hokkien POJ: Siáu-soat
Eastern Min
- Fuzhou BUC: Siēu-siók
Northern Min
- Jian'ou Romanized: Siǎu-sṳè

Vietnamese name
- Vietnamese alphabet: tiểu tuyết
- Chữ Hán: 小雪

Korean name
- Hangul: 소설
- Hanja: 小雪
Transcriptions
- Revised Romanization: soseol

Mongolian name
- Mongolian Cyrillic: бага цас
- Mongolian script: ᠪᠠᠭ᠎ᠠ ᠴᠠᠰᠤ

Japanese name
- Kanji: 小雪
- Hiragana: しょうせつ
Transcriptions
- Romanization: shousetsu

Manchu name
- Manchu script: ᠠᠵᡳᡤᡝ ᠨᡳᠮᠠᠩᡤᡳ
- Möllendorff: ajige nimanggi

Solar term
Term	Longitude	Dates
Lichun	315°	4–5 February
Yushui	330°	18–19 February
Jingzhe	345°	5–6 March
Chunfen	0°	20–21 March
Qingming	15°	4–5 April
Guyu	30°	20–21 April
Lixia	45°	5–6 May
Xiaoman	60°	21–22 May
Mangzhong	75°	5–6 June
Xiazhi	90°	21–22 June
Xiaoshu	105°	7–8 July
Dashu	120°	22–23 July
Liqiu	135°	7–8 August
Chushu	150°	23–24 August
Bailu	165°	7–8 September
Qiufen	180°	23–24 September
Hanlu	195°	8–9 October
Shuangjiang	210°	23–24 October
Lidong	225°	7–8 November
Xiaoxue	240°	22–23 November
Daxue	255°	7–8 December
Dongzhi	270°	21–22 December
Xiaohan	285°	5–6 January
Dahan	300°	20–21 January

The traditional Chinese lunisolar calendar divides a year into 24 solar terms (節氣). Xiǎoxuě (Chinese: 小雪; pinyin: xiǎoxuě) is the 20th solar term. It begins when the Sun reaches the celestial longitude of 240° and ends when it reaches the longitude of 255°. It more often refers in particular to the day when the Sun is exactly at the celestial longitude of 240°. In the Gregorian calendar, it usually begins around 22 November and ends around 7 December.

== Pentads ==
- 虹藏不見, 'Rainbows are concealed from view'. It was believed that rainbows were the results of yin and yang energy mixing; winter, being dominated by yin, would not present rainbows.
- 天氣上騰地氣下降, 'The Qi of the sky ascends, the qi of the earth descends'
- 閉塞而成冬, 'Closure and stasis create winter'. The end of mixing between sky and earth, yin and yang, leads to the dormancy of winter.

== Date and time ==
Date and Time of Xiaoxue (at UTC+08)
Year	Begin	End
丙申	2016-11-22 05:22	2016-12-07 00:41
丁酉	2017-11-22 11:04	2017-12-07 06:32
戊戌	2018-11-22 17:00	2018-12-07 12:25
己亥	2019-11-22 22:58	2019-12-07 18:18
庚子	2020-11-22 04:40	2020-12-07 00:09
辛丑	2021-11-22 10:33	2021-12-07 05:57
壬寅	2022-11-22 16:20	2022-12-07 11:46
癸卯	2023-11-22 22:03	2023-12-07 17:33
甲辰	2024-11-22 03:56	2024-12-06 23:17
乙巳	2025-11-22 09:35	2025-12-07 05:04
丙午	2026-11-22 15:23	2026-12-07 10:52
丁未	2027-11-22 21:16	2027-12-07 16:37
戊申	2028-11-22 02:54	2028-12-06 22:24
己酉	2029-11-22 08:49	2029-12-07 04:14
庚戌	2030-11-22 14:44	2030-12-07 10:07
辛亥	2031-11-22 20:32	2031-12-07 16:03
壬子	2032-11-22 02:31	2032-12-06 21:53
癸丑	2033-11-22 08:15	2033-12-07 03:44
甲寅	2034-11-22 14:04	2034-12-07 09:36
乙卯	2035-11-22 20:03	2035-12-07 15:25
丙辰	2036-11-22 01:45	2036-12-06 21:15

Preceded by Lidong (立冬)	Solar term (節氣)	Succeeded by Daxue (大雪)
