= Guyu =

Sixth solar term of traditional East Asian calendars

Chinese name
- Traditional Chinese: 穀雨
- Simplified Chinese: 谷雨
- Literal meaning: grain rain
Transcriptions
Standard Mandarin
- Hanyu Pinyin: gǔ yǔ
- Bopomofo: ㄍㄨˇ ㄩˇ
Hakka
- Pha̍k-fa-sṳ: Kuk-yí
Yue: Cantonese
- Yale Romanization: gūk yúh
- Jyutping: guk^{1} jyu^{5}
Southern Min
- Hokkien POJ: Kok-ú / Kok-í
Eastern Min
- Fuzhou BUC: Gók→Gúk-ṳ̄
Northern Min
- Jian'ou Romanized: Gŭ-ṳ̀

Vietnamese name
- Vietnamese alphabet: cốc vũ
- Chữ Hán: 穀雨

Korean name
- Hangul: 곡우
- Hanja: 穀雨
Transcriptions
- Revised Romanization: gogu

Mongolian name
- Mongolian Cyrillic: тариалангийн хур
- Mongolian script: ᠲᠠᠷᠢᠶᠠᠯᠠᠩ ᠤᠨ ᠬᠤᠷ᠎ᠠ

Japanese name
- Kanji: 穀雨
- Hiragana: こくう
Transcriptions
- Romanization: kokuu

Manchu name
- Manchu script: ᠵᡝᡴᡠ ᠠᡤᠠ
- Möllendorff: jeku aga

Solar term
Term	Longitude	Dates
Lichun	315°	4–5 February
Yushui	330°	18–19 February
Jingzhe	345°	5–6 March
Chunfen	0°	20–21 March
Qingming	15°	4–5 April
Guyu	30°	20–21 April
Lixia	45°	5–6 May
Xiaoman	60°	21–22 May
Mangzhong	75°	5–6 June
Xiazhi	90°	21–22 June
Xiaoshu	105°	7–8 July
Dashu	120°	22–23 July
Liqiu	135°	7–8 August
Chushu	150°	23–24 August
Bailu	165°	7–8 September
Qiufen	180°	23–24 September
Hanlu	195°	8–9 October
Shuangjiang	210°	23–24 October
Lidong	225°	7–8 November
Xiaoxue	240°	22–23 November
Daxue	255°	7–8 December
Dongzhi	270°	21–22 December
Xiaohan	285°	5–6 January
Dahan	300°	20–21 January

The traditional Chinese lunisolar calendar divide a year into 24 solar terms. Gǔyǔ, Kokuu, Gogu, or Cốc vũ is the 6th solar term. It begins when the Sun reaches the celestial longitude of 30° and ends when it reaches the longitude of 45°. It more often refers in particular to the day when the Sun is exactly at the celestial longitude of 30°. In the Gregorian calendar, it usually begins around April 20 and ends around May 5.

Traditionally, Guyu marks the beginning of warmer temperatures and the onset of the rainy season, making it an important period for farmers to ensure a satisfactory harvest for the rest of the year.

== Pentads ==
Each solar term can be divided into 3 pentads (候). They are: first pentad (初候), second pentad (次候) and last pentad (末候). Pentads in Guyu include:

=== China ===
- First pentad: 萍始生, 'Duckweed begins to sprout'.
- Second pentad: 鳴鳩拂其羽, 'Cuckoo shakes off wings'.
- Last pentad: 戴勝降于桑, 'Hoopoe perches in mulberry trees'.

=== Japan ===
- First pentad: Ashi hajimete shōzu (葭始生), 'Reed begins to bud'.
- Second pentad: Shimo yamite nae izuru (霜止出苗), 'Frost ends and rice seedlings to grow'.
- Last pentad: Botan hanasaku (牡丹華), 'Peony blooms'.

== Date and time ==
Date and Time of Guyu (at UTC+08)
Year	Begin	End
丙申	2016-04-19 23:29	2016-05-05 09:41
丁酉	2017-04-20 05:27	2017-05-05 15:31
戊戌	2018-04-20 11:12	2018-05-05 21:25
己亥	2019-04-20 16:55	2019-05-06 03:02
庚子	2020-04-19 22:45	2020-05-05 08:51
辛丑	2021-04-20 04:33	2021-05-05 14:47
壬寅	2022-04-20 10:24	2022-05-05 20:25
癸卯	2023-04-20 16:13	2023-05-06 02:18
甲辰	2024-04-19 22:00	2024-05-05 08:10
乙巳	2025-04-20 03:56	2025-05-05 13:57
丙午	2026-04-20 09:39	2026-05-05 19:49
丁未	2027-04-20 15:17	2027-05-06 01:25
戊申	2028-04-19 21:09	2028-05-05 07:12
己酉	2029-04-20 02:55	2029-05-05 13:08
庚戌	2030-04-20 08:43	2030-05-05 18:46
辛亥	2031-04-20 14:31	2031-05-06 00:35
壬子	2032-04-19 20:14	2032-05-05 06:25
癸丑	2033-04-20 02:13	2033-05-05 12:13
甲寅	2034-04-20 08:03	2034-05-05 18:09
乙卯	2035-04-20 13:49	2035-05-05 23:54
丙辰	2036-04-19 19:50	2036-05-05 05:49

Preceded by Qingming (清明)	Solar term (節氣)	Succeeded by Lixia (立夏)
