= Lidong =

Nineteenth solar term of traditional East Asian calendars

Chinese name
- Chinese: 立冬
- Literal meaning: start of winter
Transcriptions
Standard Mandarin
- Hanyu Pinyin: lìdōng
- Bopomofo: ㄌㄧˋ ㄉㄨㄥ
Hakka
- Pha̍k-fa-sṳ: Li̍p-tûng
Yue: Cantonese
- Yale Romanization: laahp dūng
- Jyutping: laap^{6} dung^{1}
Southern Min
- Hokkien POJ: Li̍p-tong
Eastern Min
- Fuzhou BUC: Lĭk-dĕ̤ng
Northern Min
- Jian'ou Romanized: Lì-dóng

Vietnamese name
- Vietnamese alphabet: lập đông
- Chữ Hán: 立冬

North Korean name
- Chosŏn'gŭl: 립동
- Hancha: 立冬
Transcriptions
- Revised Romanization: ripdong

South Korean name
- Hangul: 입동
- Hanja: 立冬
Transcriptions
- Revised Romanization: ipdong

Mongolian name
- Mongolian Cyrillic: өвлийн уур
- Mongolian script: ᠡᠪᠦᠯ ᠦᠨ ᠠᠭᠤᠷ

Japanese name
- Kanji: 立冬
- Hiragana: りっとう
Transcriptions
- Romanization: rittō

Manchu name
- Manchu script: ᡨᡠᠸᡝᡵᡳ ᡩᠣᠰᡳᠮᠪᡳ
- Möllendorff: tuweri dosimbi

Solar term
Term	Longitude	Dates
Lichun	315°	4–5 February
Yushui	330°	18–19 February
Jingzhe	345°	5–6 March
Chunfen	0°	20–21 March
Qingming	15°	4–5 April
Guyu	30°	20–21 April
Lixia	45°	5–6 May
Xiaoman	60°	21–22 May
Mangzhong	75°	5–6 June
Xiazhi	90°	21–22 June
Xiaoshu	105°	7–8 July
Dashu	120°	22–23 July
Liqiu	135°	7–8 August
Chushu	150°	23–24 August
Bailu	165°	7–8 September
Qiufen	180°	23–24 September
Hanlu	195°	8–9 October
Shuangjiang	210°	23–24 October
Lidong	225°	7–8 November
Xiaoxue	240°	22–23 November
Daxue	255°	7–8 December
Dongzhi	270°	21–22 December
Xiaohan	285°	5–6 January
Dahan	300°	20–21 January

The traditional Chinese calendar divides a year into 24 solar terms. Lìdōng, Rittō, Ipdong, or Lập đông (Chinese and Japanese: 立冬; pinyin: lìdōng; rōmaji: rittō; Korean: 입동; romaja: ipdong; Vietnamese: lập đông; lit. 'start of winter') is the 19th solar term. It begins when the Sun reaches the celestial longitude of 225° and ends when it reaches the longitude of 240°. It more often refers in particular to the day when the Sun is exactly at the celestial longitude of 225°. In the Gregorian calendar, it usually begins around November 7 and ends around November 22.

Lidong signifies the beginning of winter in East Asian cultures.

== Pentads ==
- 水始冰, 'Water begins to freeze' – the initial stages of water bodies freezing over.
- 地始凍, 'The earth begins to harden'
- 雉入大水為蜃, 'Pheasants enter the water for clams'

== Date and time ==
Date and Time of Lidong (at UTC+08)
Year	Begin	End
丙申	2016-11-07 07:47	2016-11-22 05:22
丁酉	2017-11-07 13:37	2017-11-22 11:04
戊戌	2018-11-07 19:31	2018-11-22 17:00
己亥	2019-11-08 01:24	2019-11-22 22:58
庚子	2020-11-07 07:14	2020-11-22 04:40
辛丑	2021-11-07 12:59	2021-11-22 10:33
壬寅	2022-11-07 18:45	2022-11-22 16:20
癸卯	2023-11-08 00:36	2023-11-22 22:03
甲辰	2024-11-07 06:20	2024-11-22 03:56
乙巳	2025-11-07 12:04	2025-11-22 09:35
丙午	2026-11-07 17:52	2026-11-22 15:23
丁未	2027-11-07 23:38	2027-11-22 21:16
戊申	2028-11-07 05:27	2028-11-22 02:54
己酉	2029-11-07 11:16	2029-11-22 08:49
庚戌	2030-11-07 17:08	2030-11-22 14:44
辛亥	2031-11-07 23:05	2031-11-22 20:32
壬子	2032-11-07 04:54	2032-11-22 02:31
癸丑	2033-11-07 10:40	2033-11-22 08:15
甲寅	2034-11-07 16:33	2034-11-22 14:04
乙卯	2035-11-07 22:23	2035-11-22 20:03
丙辰	2036-11-07 04:14	2036-11-22 01:45

== See also ==
- Samhain

Preceded by Shuangjiang (霜降)	Solar term (節氣)	Succeeded by Xiaoxue (小雪)
