= Qingming (solar term) =

Fifth solar term of Chinese calendars

Chinese name
- Chinese: 清明
- Literal meaning: Clear and bright
Transcriptions
Standard Mandarin
- Hanyu Pinyin: qīng míng
- Bopomofo: ㄑㄧㄥ ㄇㄧㄥˊ
Hakka
- Pha̍k-fa-sṳ: Chhîn-mìn
Yue: Cantonese
- Yale Romanization: chīng mìhng
- Jyutping: cing^{1} ming^{4}
Southern Min
- Hokkien POJ: Chheng-bêng / Chhiⁿ-miâ
- Tâi-lô: Tshing-bîng / Tshinn-miâ
Eastern Min
- Fuzhou BUC: Chĭng-mìng
Northern Min
- Jian'ou Romanized: Chéng-mêng

Vietnamese name
- Vietnamese alphabet: thanh minh
- Chữ Hán: 清明

Korean name
- Hangul: 청명
- Hanja: 清明
Transcriptions
- Revised Romanization: cheongmyeong

Mongolian name
- Mongolian Cyrillic: ханш нээх
- Mongolian script: ᠬᠠᠩᠰᠢ ᠨᠡᠭᠡᠭᠡᠬᠦ

Japanese name
- Kanji: 清明
- Hiragana: せいめい
Transcriptions
- Romanization: seimei

Manchu name
- Manchu script: ᡥᠠᠩᠰᡳ ᡳᠨᡝᠩᡤᡳ
- Möllendorff: hangsi inenggi

Solar term
Term	Longitude	Dates
Lichun	315°	4–5 February
Yushui	330°	18–19 February
Jingzhe	345°	5–6 March
Chunfen	0°	20–21 March
Qingming	15°	4–5 April
Guyu	30°	20–21 April
Lixia	45°	5–6 May
Xiaoman	60°	21–22 May
Mangzhong	75°	5–6 June
Xiazhi	90°	21–22 June
Xiaoshu	105°	7–8 July
Dashu	120°	22–23 July
Liqiu	135°	7–8 August
Chushu	150°	23–24 August
Bailu	165°	7–8 September
Qiufen	180°	23–24 September
Hanlu	195°	8–9 October
Shuangjiang	210°	23–24 October
Lidong	225°	7–8 November
Xiaoxue	240°	22–23 November
Daxue	255°	7–8 December
Dongzhi	270°	21–22 December
Xiaohan	285°	5–6 January
Dahan	300°	20–21 January

Qīngmíng, Seimei, Cheongmyeong or Thanh minh, is the name of the 5th solar term of the traditional Chinese lunisolar calendar, which divides a year into 24 solar terms (t. 節氣/s. 节气). In space partitioning, Qingming begins when the sun reaches the celestial longitude of 15° and ends when it reaches the longitude of 30°. It more often refers in particular to the day when the sun is exactly at the celestial longitude of 15°, usually on April 5.

Compared to the space partitioning theory, in the time division theory Qingming falls around April 7 or approximately 106.5 days after winter equinox. In the Gregorian calendar, it usually begins around 4 or 5 April and ends around 20 April.

== Pentads ==
Each solar term can be divided into 3 pentads (候). They are: first pentad (初候), second pentad (次候) and last pentad (末候). Pentads in Qingming include:

China

- First pentad: 桐始華/桐始华, 'The paulownia begins to bloom'.
- Second pentad: 田鼠化為鴽/田鼠化为鴽, 'Voles(you) transform into quails'.
- Last pentad: 虹始見/虹始见, 'Rainbows begin to appear'.

Japan

- First pentad: 玄鳥至 (tsubame itaru), 'The swallow (Xuanniao) flies back from the south'.
- Second pentad: 鴻雁北 (kōgan kitae kaeru), 'The goose migrates to the north'.
- Last pentad: 虹始見 (niji hajimete arawaru), 'Rainbows begin to appear in the sky after shower'.

== Date and time ==
Date and Time of Qingming (at UTC+08)
Year	Begin	End
丙申	2016-04-04 16:27	2016-04-19 23:29
丁酉	2017-04-04 22:17	2017-04-20 05:27
戊戌	2018-04-05 04:12	2018-04-20 11:12
己亥	2019-04-05 09:51	2019-04-20 16:55
庚子	2020-04-04 15:38	2020-04-19 22:45
辛丑	2021-04-04 21:35	2021-04-20 04:33
壬寅	2022-04-05 03:20	2022-04-20 10:24
癸卯	2023-04-05 09:13	2023-04-20 16:13
甲辰	2024-04-04 15:02	2024-04-19 22:00
乙巳	2025-04-04 20:48	2025-04-20 03:56
丙午	2026-04-05 02:39	2026-04-20 09:39
丁未	2027-04-05 08:17	2027-04-20 15:17
戊申	2028-04-04 14:03	2028-04-19 21:09
己酉	2029-04-04 19:58	2029-04-20 02:55
庚戌	2030-04-05 01:40	2030-04-20 08:43
辛亥	2031-04-05 07:28	2031-04-20 14:31
壬子	2032-04-04 13:17	2032-04-19 20:14
癸丑	2033-04-04 19:08	2033-04-20 02:13
甲寅	2034-04-05 01:06	2034-04-20 08:03
乙卯	2035-04-05 06:54	2035-04-20 13:49
丙辰	2036-04-04 12:46	2036-04-19 19:50

== See also ==
- East Asian cultural sphere
- Qingming Festival (清明節/清明节), festival celebrated on the day of Qīngmíng
- Cold Food Festival (寒食節/寒食节), three-day festival starting one day before and ending one day after Qīngmíng
- Along the River During the Qingming Festival

Preceded by Chunfen (春分)	Solar term (節氣/节气)	Succeeded by Guyu (穀雨/谷雨)
