= Lixia =

Seventh solar term of traditional East Asian calendars

Chinese name
- Chinese: 立夏
- Literal meaning: start of summer
Transcriptions
Standard Mandarin
- Hanyu Pinyin: lìxià
- Bopomofo: ㄌㄧˋ ㄒㄧㄚˋ
Hakka
- Pha̍k-fa-sṳ: Li̍p-ha
Yue: Cantonese
- Yale Romanization: laahp hah
- Jyutping: laap^{6} haa^{6}
Southern Min
- Hokkien POJ: Li̍p-hā / Li̍p-hēe
Eastern Min
- Fuzhou BUC: Lĭk-hâ
Northern Min
- Jian'ou Romanized: Lì-hā

Vietnamese name
- Vietnamese alphabet: lập hạ
- Chữ Hán: 立夏

North Korean name
- Chosŏn'gŭl: 립하
- Hancha: 立夏
Transcriptions
- Revised Romanization: ripha

South Korean name
- Hangul: 입하
- Hanja: 立夏
Transcriptions
- Revised Romanization: ipha

Mongolian name
- Mongolian Cyrillic: зуны уур
- Mongolian script: ᠵᠤᠨ ᠤ ᠠᠭᠤᠷ

Japanese name
- Kanji: 立夏
- Hiragana: りっか
Transcriptions
- Romanization: rikka

Manchu name
- Manchu script: ᠵᡠᠸᠠᡵᡳ ᡩᠣᠰᡳᠮᠪᡳ
- Möllendorff: juweri dosimbi

Solar term
Term	Longitude	Dates
Lichun	315°	4–5 February
Yushui	330°	18–19 February
Jingzhe	345°	5–6 March
Chunfen	0°	20–21 March
Qingming	15°	4–5 April
Guyu	30°	20–21 April
Lixia	45°	5–6 May
Xiaoman	60°	21–22 May
Mangzhong	75°	5–6 June
Xiazhi	90°	21–22 June
Xiaoshu	105°	7–8 July
Dashu	120°	22–23 July
Liqiu	135°	7–8 August
Chushu	150°	23–24 August
Bailu	165°	7–8 September
Qiufen	180°	23–24 September
Hanlu	195°	8–9 October
Shuangjiang	210°	23–24 October
Lidong	225°	7–8 November
Xiaoxue	240°	22–23 November
Daxue	255°	7–8 December
Dongzhi	270°	21–22 December
Xiaohan	285°	5–6 January
Dahan	300°	20–21 January

Lìxià (lit. 'start of summer' or 'inauguration of summer') is the 7th solar term according to the traditional Chinese lunisolar calendar, which divides a year into 24 solar terms (節氣).

It begins when the Sun reaches the celestial longitude of 45° and ends when it reaches the longitude of 60°. The word Lixia most often refers specifically to the first day of this period, the day when the Sun is exactly at the celestial longitude of 45°. In the Gregorian calendar, this is around May 5, and the Lixia period ends with the beginning of the next solar term, Xiaoman, around May 21.

Lixia signifies the beginning of summer in Chinese culture, and due to the importance of summer in the agrarian society of ancient China, the day is associated with many cultural traditions, which vary by region.

== Pentads ==
Each solar term can be divided into three pentads (候). They are the first pentad (初候), second pentad (次候), and last pentad (末候). Lixia's pentads are:

- First pentad: simplified Chinese: 蝼蝈鸣; traditional Chinese: 螻蟈鳴; pinyin: lóu guō míng – crickets start to chirp
- Second pentad: Chinese: 蚯蚓出; pinyin: qiūyǐn chū – earthworms come out
- Last pentad: Chinese: 王瓜生; pinyin: wángguā shēng – melon plants begin to bear fruit

== Traditional customs ==
According to the ancient Book of Rites, on Lixia the emperor would lead the Three Ducal Ministers, the Nine Ministers, and senior officials in greeting the summer, and the day was celebrated with gifts and music. From James Legge's translation:

In this month there takes place the inauguration of summer. Three days before this ceremony, the Grand recorder informs the son of Heaven, saying, 'On such-and-such a day is the inauguration of summer. The energies of the season are most fully seen in fire.' On this the son of Heaven devotes himself to self-purification; and on the day, at the head of the three ducal ministers, the nine high ministers, and his Great officers, he proceeds to meet the summer in the southern suburbs. On their return, rewards are distributed. He grants to the feudal princes (an increase of) territory. Congratulations and gifts proceed, and all are joyful and pleased. Orders are also given to the chief master of music to teach the practice of ceremonies and music together. Orders are given to the Grand Peace-maintainer to recommend men of eminence, allow the worthy and good to have free course and bring forward the tall and large. His conferring of rank and regulation of emolument must be in accordance with the position (of the individual).

Many Lixia traditions involve food. Some traditions symbolize neighborliness, including a traditional Lixia food, "seven-family porridge" (Chinese: 七家粥; pinyin: qī jiā zhōu). Traditionally, people would ask for rice from their neighbors, cook it into rice porridge with multicolored beans and brown sugar, and share it with family, friends, and neighbors. A similar tradition, with the same significance, is "seven-family tea" (Chinese: 七家茶; pinyin: qī jiā chá): people would ask each of their neighbors for a few tea leaves and mix them together to brew tea.

For farmers in parts of China, Lixia is traditionally the time of the "three new" crops: cherries, green plums, and millet. These three early-ripening crops are typically ready to be eaten around Lixia, and traditionally some people would use them as religious offerings. In other parts of China, other crops become available around Lixia. Near Zhejiang's Guxi River, people eat Lixia cakes (made from rice or wheat), Chinese scholartree seeds, tofu, and bamboo shoots. A poem from Hangzhou mentions plums, flatcakes, cherries, cured meat, fish, black rice cakes, three-colored amaranth, sea snails, salted duck eggs, roast goose, broad beans, and rice wine fermentation, all of which were associated with Lixia. In contrast, in Taiwan, the arrival of crops is a less relevant part of Lixia, as the warm climate means that a variety of crops are available year-round.

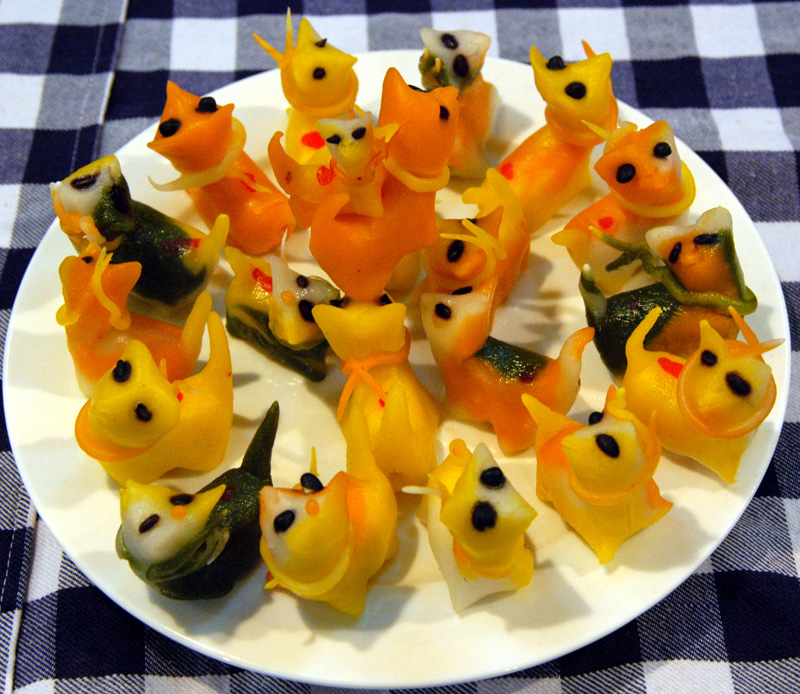
Lixia dogs

In Tangxi, Hangzhou, in addition to pastries and salted duck eggs, Lixia foods include colorful "Lixia dogs" made from glutinous rice.

Another tradition is weighing people, a complicated process that dates back to ancient China, before the existence of modern scales. Each person is weighed by sitting on a plank suspended from roof beams with hemp rope, or alternatively, an iron weight is hung from one side of the plank while the person sits in a bamboo basket hanging from the other side. This tradition is especially popular with children. With modern technology it has largely disappeared, but it is preserved in some communities as a symbol of good health for the coming summer.

== Other significance ==
According to folk sayings, Lixia is a busy time for farmers. South of the Yangtze River, it marks the beginning of the rainy season. In some areas, it signifies the end of the spring tea-picking season.

Historically, people used the sounds of animals on Lixia to predict the year's weather. According to a belief mentioned in the Book of Zhou, if crickets (and according to some interpretations, frogs) do not make noise on Lixia, the year will be very rainy with a risk of flooding.

== Date and time ==
Date and Time of Lixia (at UTC+08)
Year	Begin	End
丙申	2016-05-05 09:41	2016-05-20 22:36
丁酉	2017-05-05 15:31	2017-05-21 04:31
戊戌	2018-05-05 21:25	2018-05-21 10:14
己亥	2019-05-06 03:02	2019-05-21 15:59
庚子	2020-05-05 08:51	2020-05-20 21:49
辛丑	2021-05-05 14:47	2021-05-21 03:37
壬寅	2022-05-05 20:25	2022-05-21 09:22
癸卯	2023-05-06 02:18	2023-05-21 15:09
甲辰	2024-05-05 08:10	2024-05-20 20:59
乙巳	2025-05-05 13:57	2025-05-21 02:55
丙午	2026-05-05 19:49	2026-05-21 08:37
丁未	2027-05-06 01:25	2027-05-21 14:18
戊申	2028-05-05 07:12	2028-05-20 20:09
己酉	2029-05-05 13:08	2029-05-21 01:56
庚戌	2030-05-05 18:46	2030-05-21 07:41
辛亥	2031-05-06 00:35	2031-05-21 13:28
壬子	2032-05-05 06:25	2032-05-20 19:15
癸丑	2033-05-05 12:13	2033-05-21 01:11
甲寅	2034-05-05 18:09	2034-05-21 06:57
乙卯	2035-05-05 23:54	2035-05-21 12:43
丙辰	2036-05-05 05:49	2036-05-20 18:44

== See also ==
- Beltane

Preceded by Guyu (穀雨)	Solar term (節氣)	Succeeded by Xiaoman (小滿)
