= Xiaohan =

Twenty-third solar term of traditional East Asian calendars

Chinese name
- Chinese: 小寒
- Literal meaning: minor cold
Transcriptions
Standard Mandarin
- Hanyu Pinyin: xiǎohán
- Bopomofo: ㄒㄧㄠˇ ㄏㄢˊ
Hakka
- Pha̍k-fa-sṳ: Séu-hòn
Yue: Cantonese
- Yale Romanization: síu hòhn
- Jyutping: siu^{2} hon^{4}
Southern Min
- Hokkien POJ: Siáu-hân
Eastern Min
- Fuzhou BUC: Siēu-hàng
Northern Min
- Jian'ou Romanized: Siǎu-uǐng

Vietnamese name
- Vietnamese alphabet: tiểu hàn
- Chữ Hán: 小寒

Korean name
- Hangul: 소한
- Hanja: 小寒
Transcriptions
- Revised Romanization: sohan

Mongolian name
- Mongolian Cyrillic: бага хүйтэн
- Mongolian script: ᠪᠠᠭ᠎ᠠ ᠬᠦᠢᠲᠡᠨ

Japanese name
- Kanji: 小寒
- Hiragana: しょうかん
Transcriptions
- Romanization: shōkan

Manchu name
- Manchu script: ᠠᠵᡳᡤᡝ ᡧᠠᡥᡡᡵᡠᠨ
- Möllendorff: ajige šahūrun

Solar term
Term	Longitude	Dates
Lichun	315°	4–5 February
Yushui	330°	18–19 February
Jingzhe	345°	5–6 March
Chunfen	0°	20–21 March
Qingming	15°	4–5 April
Guyu	30°	20–21 April
Lixia	45°	5–6 May
Xiaoman	60°	21–22 May
Mangzhong	75°	5–6 June
Xiazhi	90°	21–22 June
Xiaoshu	105°	7–8 July
Dashu	120°	22–23 July
Liqiu	135°	7–8 August
Chushu	150°	23–24 August
Bailu	165°	7–8 September
Qiufen	180°	23–24 September
Hanlu	195°	8–9 October
Shuangjiang	210°	23–24 October
Lidong	225°	7–8 November
Xiaoxue	240°	22–23 November
Daxue	255°	7–8 December
Dongzhi	270°	21–22 December
Xiaohan	285°	5–6 January
Dahan	300°	20–21 January

The traditional Chinese calendar divides a year into 24 solar terms. Xiǎohán, Shōkan, Sohan, or Tiểu hàn (Chinese and Japanese: 小寒; pinyin: xiǎohán; rōmaji: shōkan; Korean: 소한; romaja: sohan; Vietnamese: tiểu hàn; lit. 'minor cold') is the 23rd solar term. It begins when the Sun reaches the celestial longitude of 285° and ends when it reaches the longitude of 300°. It more often refers in particular to the day when the Sun is exactly at the celestial longitude of 285°. In the Gregorian calendar, it usually begins around 5 January and ends around 20 January.

== Date and time ==
Date and Time of Xiaohan (at UTC+08)
Year	Begin	End
乙未	2016-01-06 06:08	2016-01-20 23:27
丙申	2017-01-05 11:56	2017-01-20 05:23
丁酉	2018-01-05 17:49	2018-01-20 11:09
戊戌	2019-01-05 23:38	2019-01-20 16:59
己亥	2020-01-06 05:30	2020-01-20 22:54
庚子	2021-01-05 11:23	2021-01-20 04:40
辛丑	2022-01-05 17:14	2022-01-20 10:39
壬寅	2023-01-05 23:04	2023-01-20 16:29
癸卯	2024-01-06 04:49	2024-01-20 22:07
甲辰	2025-01-05 10:32	2025-01-20 04:00
乙巳	2026-01-05 16:23	2026-01-20 09:44
丙午	2027-01-05 22:10	2027-01-20 15:30
丁未	2028-01-06 03:54	2028-01-20 21:21
戊申	2029-01-05 09:42	2029-01-20 03:01
己酉	2030-01-05 15:30	2030-01-20 08:54
庚戌	2031-01-05 21:23	2031-01-20 14:48
辛亥	2032-01-06 03:16	2032-01-20 20:31
壬子	2033-01-05 09:08	2033-01-20 02:33
癸丑	2034-01-05 15:04	2034-01-20 08:27
甲寅	2035-01-05 20:55	2035-01-20 14:14
乙卯	2036-01-06 02:43	2036-01-20 20:10

Preceded by Dongzhi (冬至)	Solar term (節氣)	Succeeded by Dahan (大寒)
