= Shuangjiang (solar term) =

Eighteenth solar term of traditional East Asian calendars

Chinese name
- Chinese: 霜降
- Literal meaning: frost descent
Transcriptions
Standard Mandarin
- Hanyu Pinyin: shuāngjiàng
- Bopomofo: ㄕㄨㄤ ㄐㄧㄤˋ
Hakka
- Pha̍k-fa-sṳ: Sông-kong
Yue: Cantonese
- Yale Romanization: sēung gong
- Jyutping: soeng^{1} gong^{3}
Southern Min
- Hokkien POJ: Song-kàng
Eastern Min
- Fuzhou BUC: Sŏng-góng
Northern Min
- Jian'ou Romanized: Sóng-go̿ng

Vietnamese name
- Vietnamese alphabet: sương giáng
- Chữ Hán: 霜降

Korean name
- Hangul: 상강
- Hanja: 霜降
Transcriptions
- Revised Romanization: sanggang

Mongolian name
- Mongolian Cyrillic: хяруу унах
- Mongolian script: ᠬᠢᠷᠠᠭᠤ ᠤᠨᠠᠬᠤ

Japanese name
- Kanji: 霜降
- Hiragana: そうこう
Transcriptions
- Romanization: sōkō

Manchu name
- Manchu script: ᡤᡝᠴᡝᠨ ᡤᡝᠴᡝᠮᠪᡳ
- Möllendorff: gecen gecembi

Solar term
| Term | Longitude | Dates |
|---|---|---|
| Lichun | 315° | 4–5 February |
| Yushui | 330° | 18–19 February |
| Jingzhe | 345° | 5–6 March |
| Chunfen | 0° | 20–21 March |
| Qingming | 15° | 4–5 April |
| Guyu | 30° | 20–21 April |
| Lixia | 45° | 5–6 May |
| Xiaoman | 60° | 21–22 May |
| Mangzhong | 75° | 5–6 June |
| Xiazhi | 90° | 21–22 June |
| Xiaoshu | 105° | 7–8 July |
| Dashu | 120° | 22–23 July |
| Liqiu | 135° | 7–8 August |
| Chushu | 150° | 23–24 August |
| Bailu | 165° | 7–8 September |
| Qiufen | 180° | 23–24 September |
| Hanlu | 195° | 8–9 October |
| Shuangjiang | 210° | 23–24 October |
| Lidong | 225° | 7–8 November |
| Xiaoxue | 240° | 22–23 November |
| Daxue | 255° | 7–8 December |
| Dongzhi | 270° | 21–22 December |
| Xiaohan | 285° | 5–6 January |
| Dahan | 300° | 20–21 January |

The traditional Chinese calendar divides a year into 24 solar terms (节气/節氣). Shuāngjiàng, Sōkō, Sanggang, or Sương giáng (Chinese and Japanese: 霜降; pinyin: shuāngjiàng; rōmaji: sōkō; Korean: 상강; romaja: sanggang; Vietnamese: sương giáng; lit. 'frost descent') is the 18th solar term. It begins when the Sun reaches the celestial longitude of 210° and ends when it reaches the longitude of 225°. It more often refers in particular to the day when the Sun is exactly at the celestial longitude of 210°. In the Gregorian calendar, it usually begins around October 23 and ends around November 7.

The western holiday of Halloween occurs in this solar term.

== Pentads ==
- 豺乃祭獸, 'Dholes make offerings of the beasts'
- 草木黃落, 'The plants yellow and shed leaves'
- 蟄蟲咸俯, 'All insects go dormant'

== Date and time ==
Date and Time of Shuangjiang (at UTC+08)
| Year | Begin | End |
|---|---|---|
| 丙申 | 2016-10-23 07:45 | 2016-11-07 07:47 |
| 丁酉 | 2017-10-23 13:26 | 2017-11-07 13:37 |
| 戊戌 | 2018-10-23 19:22 | 2018-11-07 19:31 |
| 己亥 | 2019-10-24 01:19 | 2019-11-08 01:24 |
| 庚子 | 2020-10-23 06:59 | 2020-11-07 07:14 |
| 辛丑 | 2021-10-23 12:51 | 2021-11-07 12:59 |
| 壬寅 | 2022-10-23 18:36 | 2022-11-07 18:45 |
| 癸卯 | 2023-10-24 00:21 | 2023-11-08 00:36 |
| 甲辰 | 2024-10-23 06:14 | 2024-11-07 06:20 |
| 乙巳 | 2025-10-23 11:51 | 2025-11-07 12:04 |
| 丙午 | 2026-10-23 17:38 | 2026-11-07 17:52 |
| 丁未 | 2027-10-23 23:32 | 2027-11-07 23:38 |
| 戊申 | 2028-10-23 05:13 | 2028-11-07 05:27 |
| 己酉 | 2029-10-23 11:07 | 2029-11-07 11:16 |
| 庚戌 | 2030-10-23 17:00 | 2030-11-07 17:08 |
| 辛亥 | 2031-10-23 22:49 | 2031-11-07 23:05 |
| 壬子 | 2032-10-23 04:46 | 2032-11-07 04:54 |
| 癸丑 | 2033-10-23 10:27 | 2033-11-07 10:40 |
| 甲寅 | 2034-10-23 16:16 | 2034-11-07 16:33 |
| 乙卯 | 2035-10-23 22:16 | 2035-11-07 22:23 |
| 丙辰 | 2036-10-23 03:59 | 2036-11-07 04:14 |

| Preceded by Hanlu (寒露) | Solar term (節氣) | Succeeded by Lidong (立冬) |
