= Xiaoman =

Eighth solar term of traditional East Asian calendars

Chinese name
- Traditional Chinese: 小滿
- Simplified Chinese: 小满
- Literal meaning: small full
Transcriptions
Standard Mandarin
- Hanyu Pinyin: xiǎomǎn
- Bopomofo: ㄒㄧㄠˇ ㄇㄢˇ
Hakka
- Pha̍k-fa-sṳ: Séu-mân
Yue: Cantonese
- Yale Romanization: síu múhn
- Jyutping: siu^{2} mun^{5}
Southern Min
- Hokkien POJ: Sió-boán / Sió-móa
Eastern Min
- Fuzhou BUC: Siēu-māng
Northern Min
- Jian'ou Romanized: Siǎu-muǐng

Vietnamese name
- Vietnamese alphabet: tiểu mãn
- Chữ Hán: 小滿

Korean name
- Hangul: 소만
- Hanja: 小滿
Transcriptions
- Revised Romanization: soman

Mongolian name
- Mongolian Cyrillic: өчүүхэн дүүрэн
- Mongolian script: ᠥᠴᠦᠭᠡᠨ ᠳᠦᠭᠦᠷᠡᠩ

Japanese name
- Kanji: 小満
- Hiragana: しょうまん
Transcriptions
- Romanization: shōman

Manchu name
- Manchu script: ᠠᠵᡳᡤᡝ ᠵᠠᠯᡠ
- Möllendorff: ajige jalu

Solar term
Term	Longitude	Dates
Lichun	315°	4–5 February
Yushui	330°	18–19 February
Jingzhe	345°	5–6 March
Chunfen	0°	20–21 March
Qingming	15°	4–5 April
Guyu	30°	20–21 April
Lixia	45°	5–6 May
Xiaoman	60°	21–22 May
Mangzhong	75°	5–6 June
Xiazhi	90°	21–22 June
Xiaoshu	105°	7–8 July
Dashu	120°	22–23 July
Liqiu	135°	7–8 August
Chushu	150°	23–24 August
Bailu	165°	7–8 September
Qiufen	180°	23–24 September
Hanlu	195°	8–9 October
Shuangjiang	210°	23–24 October
Lidong	225°	7–8 November
Xiaoxue	240°	22–23 November
Daxue	255°	7–8 December
Dongzhi	270°	21–22 December
Xiaohan	285°	5–6 January
Dahan	300°	20–21 January

The traditional Chinese calendar divides a year into 24 solar terms. Xiǎomǎn, Shōman, Soman, or Tiểu mãn is the 8th solar term. It begins when the Sun reaches the celestial longitude of 60° and ends when it reaches the longitude of 75°. It more often refers in particular to the day when the Sun is exactly at the celestial longitude of 60°. In the Gregorian calendar, it usually begins around 21 May and ends around 5 June (6 June East Asia time).

== Date and time ==
Date and Time of Xiaoman (at UTC+08)
Year	Begin	End
丙申	2016-05-20 22:36	2016-06-05 13:48
丁酉	2017-05-21 04:31	2017-06-05 19:36
戊戌	2018-05-21 10:14	2018-06-06 01:29
己亥	2019-05-21 15:59	2019-06-06 07:06
庚子	2020-05-20 21:49	2020-06-05 12:58
辛丑	2021-05-21 03:37	2021-06-05 18:52
壬寅	2022-05-21 09:22	2022-06-06 00:25
癸卯	2023-05-21 15:09	2023-06-06 06:18
甲辰	2024-05-20 20:59	2024-06-05 12:10
乙巳	2025-05-21 02:55	2025-06-05 17:56
丙午	2026-05-21 08:37	2026-06-05 23:49
丁未	2027-05-21 14:18	2027-06-06 05:25
戊申	2028-05-20 20:09	2028-06-05 11:16
己酉	2029-05-21 01:56	2029-06-05 17:10
庚戌	2030-05-21 07:41	2030-06-05 22:44
辛亥	2031-05-21 13:28	2031-06-06 04:35
壬子	2032-05-20 19:15	2032-06-05 10:28
癸丑	2033-05-21 01:11	2033-06-05 16:13
甲寅	2034-05-21 06:57	2034-06-05 22:07
乙卯	2035-05-21 12:43	2035-06-06 03:50
丙辰	2036-05-20 18:44	2036-06-05 09:46

Preceded by Lixia (立夏)	Solar term (節氣)	Succeeded by Mangzhong (芒種)
