= Bailu (solar term) =

Fifteenth solar term of traditional East Asian calendars

Chinese name
- Chinese: 白露
- Literal meaning: white dew
Transcriptions
Standard Mandarin
- Hanyu Pinyin: báilù
- Bopomofo: ㄅㄞ ㄌㄨˋ
Hakka
- Pha̍k-fa-sṳ: pha̍k-lu / phe̍t-lu
Yue: Cantonese
- Yale Romanization: baahk louh
- Jyutping: baak^{6} lou^{6}
Southern Min
- Hokkien POJ: pe̍k-lō͘
Eastern Min
- Fuzhou BUC: băh-ló
Northern Min
- Jian'ou Romanized: bā-sū

Vietnamese name
- Vietnamese alphabet: bạch lộ
- Chữ Hán: 白露

Korean name
- Hangul: 백로
- Hanja: 白露
Transcriptions
- Revised Romanization: baengno

Mongolian name
- Mongolian Cyrillic: цагаан шүүдэр
- Mongolian script: ᠴᠠᠭᠠᠨ ᠰᠢᠭᠦᠳᠡᠷᠢ

Japanese name
- Kanji: 白露
- Hiragana: はくろ
Transcriptions
- Romanization: hakuro

Manchu name
- Manchu script: ᡧᠠᠨᠶᠠᠨ ᠰᡳᠯᡝᠩᡤᡳ
- Möllendorff: šanyan silenggi

Solar term
Term	Longitude	Dates
Lichun	315°	4–5 February
Yushui	330°	18–19 February
Jingzhe	345°	5–6 March
Chunfen	0°	20–21 March
Qingming	15°	4–5 April
Guyu	30°	20–21 April
Lixia	45°	5–6 May
Xiaoman	60°	21–22 May
Mangzhong	75°	5–6 June
Xiazhi	90°	21–22 June
Xiaoshu	105°	7–8 July
Dashu	120°	22–23 July
Liqiu	135°	7–8 August
Chushu	150°	23–24 August
Bailu	165°	7–8 September
Qiufen	180°	23–24 September
Hanlu	195°	8–9 October
Shuangjiang	210°	23–24 October
Lidong	225°	7–8 November
Xiaoxue	240°	22–23 November
Daxue	255°	7–8 December
Dongzhi	270°	21–22 December
Xiaohan	285°	5–6 January
Dahan	300°	20–21 January

The traditional Chinese calendar divides a year into 24 solar terms. Báilù, Hakuro, Baengno, or Bạch lộ (Chinese and Japanese: 白露; pinyin: báilù; rōmaji: hakuro; Korean: 백로; romaja: baengno; Vietnamese: bạch lộ; lit. 'white dew') is the 15th solar term. It begins when the Sun reaches the celestial longitude of 165° and ends when it reaches the longitude of 180°. It more often refers in particular to the day when the Sun is exactly at the celestial longitude of 165°. In the Gregorian calendar, it usually begins around September 7 and ends around September 23.

== Pentads ==
- 鴻雁來, 'The wild geese come' – referring to the southward migration of geese.
- 玄鳥歸, 'The dark birds return' – 'dark birds' refer to swallows or Xuanniao.
- 群鳥養羞, 'Birds stock their hoards' – i.e. in preparation for winter.

== Date and time ==
Date and Time of Bailu (at UTC+08)
Year	Begin	End
丙申	2016-09-07 12:51	2016-09-22 22:21
丁酉	2017-09-07 18:38	2017-09-23 04:01
戊戌	2018-09-08 00:29	2018-09-23 09:54
己亥	2019-09-08 06:16	2019-09-23 15:50
庚子	2020-09-07 12:08	2020-09-22 21:30
辛丑	2021-09-07 17:53	2021-09-23 03:21
壬寅	2022-09-07 23:32	2022-09-23 09:04
癸卯	2023-09-08 05:27	2023-09-23 14:50
甲辰	2024-09-07 11:11	2024-09-22 20:43
乙巳	2025-09-07 16:52	2025-09-23 02:19
丙午	2026-09-07 22:41	2026-09-23 08:05
丁未	2027-09-08 04:28	2027-09-23 14:01
戊申	2028-09-07 10:22	2028-09-22 19:45
己酉	2029-09-07 16:11	2029-09-23 01:38
庚戌	2030-09-07 21:53	2030-09-23 07:27
辛亥	2031-09-08 03:50	2031-09-23 13:15
壬子	2032-09-07 09:38	2032-09-22 19:10
癸丑	2033-09-07 15:20	2033-09-23 00:52
甲寅	2034-09-07 21:14	2034-09-23 06:39
乙卯	2035-09-08 03:02	2035-09-23 12:39
丙辰	2036-09-07 08:55	2036-09-22 18:23

Preceded by Chushu (處暑)	Solar term (節氣)	Succeeded by Qiufen (秋分)
