= Liqiu =

Thirteenth solar term of traditional East Asian calendars

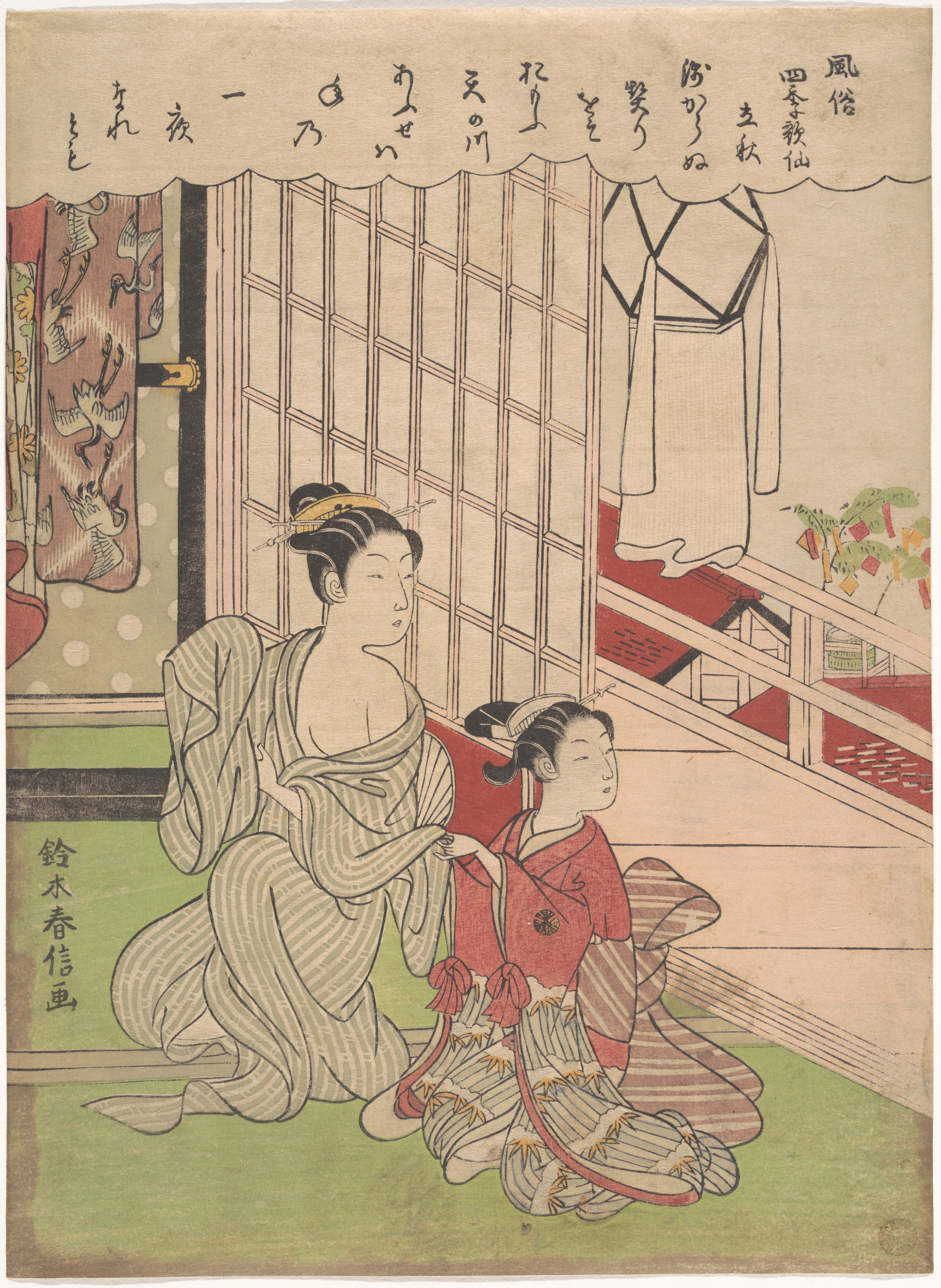
- Woodcut depicting Risshū (Suzuki Harunobu, c. 1865)

Chinese name
- Chinese: 立秋
- Literal meaning: start of autumn
Transcriptions
Standard Mandarin
- Hanyu Pinyin: lìqiū
- Bopomofo: ㄌㄧˋ ㄑㄧㄡ
Hakka
- Pha̍k-fa-sṳ: Li̍p-chhiû
Yue: Cantonese
- Yale Romanization: laahp chāu
- Jyutping: laap^{6} cau^{1}
Southern Min
- Hokkien POJ: Li̍p-chhiu
Eastern Min
- Fuzhou BUC: Lĭk-chiŭ
Northern Min
- Jian'ou Romanized: Lì-chiú

Vietnamese name
- Vietnamese alphabet: lập thu
- Chữ Hán: 立秋

North Korean name
- Chosŏn'gŭl: 립추
- Hancha: 立秋
Transcriptions
- Revised Romanization: Ripchu

South Korean name
- Hangul: 입추
- Hanja: 立秋
Transcriptions
- Revised Romanization: ipchu

Mongolian name
- Mongolian Cyrillic: намрын уур
- Mongolian script: ᠨᠠᠮᠤᠷ ᠤᠨ ᠠᠭᠤᠷ

Japanese name
- Kanji: 立秋
- Hiragana: りっしゅう
Transcriptions
- Romanization: risshū

Manchu name
- Manchu script: ᠪᠣᠯᠣᡵᡳ ᡩᠣᠰᡳᠮᠪᡳ
- Möllendorff: bolori dosimbi

Solar term
Term	Longitude	Dates
Lichun	315°	4–5 February
Yushui	330°	18–19 February
Jingzhe	345°	5–6 March
Chunfen	0°	20–21 March
Qingming	15°	4–5 April
Guyu	30°	20–21 April
Lixia	45°	5–6 May
Xiaoman	60°	21–22 May
Mangzhong	75°	5–6 June
Xiazhi	90°	21–22 June
Xiaoshu	105°	7–8 July
Dashu	120°	22–23 July
Liqiu	135°	7–8 August
Chushu	150°	23–24 August
Bailu	165°	7–8 September
Qiufen	180°	23–24 September
Hanlu	195°	8–9 October
Shuangjiang	210°	23–24 October
Lidong	225°	7–8 November
Xiaoxue	240°	22–23 November
Daxue	255°	7–8 December
Dongzhi	270°	21–22 December
Xiaohan	285°	5–6 January
Dahan	300°	20–21 January

The traditional Chinese calendar divides a year into 24 solar terms. Lìqiū, Risshū, Ipchu, or Lập thu (Chinese: 立秋; pinyin: lìqiū) is the 13th solar term. It begins when the Sun reaches the celestial longitude of 135° and ends when it reaches the longitude of 150°. It more often refers in particular to the day when the Sun is exactly at the celestial longitude of 135°. In the Gregorian calendar, it usually begins around August 7 and ends around August 23.

Liqiu signifies the beginning of autumn in East Asian cultures.

== Date and time ==
Date and Time of Liqiu (at UTC+08)
Year	Begin	End
丙申	2016-08-07 09:53	2016-08-23 00:38
丁酉	2017-08-07 15:39	2017-08-23 06:20
戊戌	2018-08-07 21:30	2018-08-23 12:08
己亥	2019-08-08 03:13	2019-08-23 18:02
庚子	2020-08-07 09:06	2020-08-22 23:45
辛丑	2021-08-07 14:54	2021-08-23 05:35
壬寅	2022-08-07 20:29	2022-08-23 11:16
癸卯	2023-08-08 02:23	2023-08-23 17:01
甲辰	2024-08-07 08:09	2024-08-22 22:55
乙巳	2025-08-07 13:51	2025-08-23 04:34
丙午	2026-08-07 19:42	2026-08-23 10:18
丁未	2027-08-08 01:26	2027-08-23 16:14
戊申	2028-08-07 07:21	2028-08-22 22:01
己酉	2029-08-07 13:11	2029-08-23 03:51
庚戌	2030-08-07 18:47	2030-08-23 09:36
辛亥	2031-08-08 00:43	2031-08-23 15:23
壬子	2032-08-07 06:33	2032-08-22 21:18
癸丑	2033-08-07 12:15	2033-08-23 03:02
甲寅	2034-08-07 18:09	2034-08-23 08:47
乙卯	2035-08-07 23:54	2035-08-23 14:44
丙辰	2036-08-07 05:49	2036-08-22 20:32

== See also ==
- Lughnasadh

Preceded by Dashu (大暑)	Solar term (節氣)	Succeeded by Chushu (處暑)
