= Yushui (solar term) =

Second solar term of traditional East Asian calendars

Chinese name
- Chinese: 雨水
- Literal meaning: rain water
Transcriptions
Standard Mandarin
- Hanyu Pinyin: yǔ shuǐ
- Bopomofo: ㄩˇ ㄕㄨㄟˇ
Hakka
- Pha̍k-fa-sṳ: Yí-súi
Yue: Cantonese
- Yale Romanization: yúh séui
- Jyutping: jyu^{5} seoi^{2}
Southern Min
- Hokkien POJ: Ú-súi / Í-súi / Í-chúi
Eastern Min
- Fuzhou BUC: Ṳ̄-cūi
Northern Min
- Jian'ou Romanized: Hṳ̄-sṳ̌

Vietnamese name
- Vietnamese alphabet: vũ thủy
- Chữ Hán: 雨水

Korean name
- Hangul: 우수
- Hanja: 雨水
Transcriptions
- Revised Romanization: usu

Mongolian name
- Mongolian Cyrillic: хур уус
- Mongolian script: ᠬᠤᠷ᠎ᠠ ᠤᠰᠤ

Japanese name
- Kanji: 雨水
- Hiragana: うすい
Transcriptions
- Romanization: usui

Manchu name
- Manchu script: ᠠᡤᠠ ᠮᡠᡴᡝ
- Möllendorff: aga muke

Solar term
Term	Longitude	Dates
Lichun	315°	4–5 February
Yushui	330°	18–19 February
Jingzhe	345°	5–6 March
Chunfen	0°	20–21 March
Qingming	15°	4–5 April
Guyu	30°	20–21 April
Lixia	45°	5–6 May
Xiaoman	60°	21–22 May
Mangzhong	75°	5–6 June
Xiazhi	90°	21–22 June
Xiaoshu	105°	7–8 July
Dashu	120°	22–23 July
Liqiu	135°	7–8 August
Chushu	150°	23–24 August
Bailu	165°	7–8 September
Qiufen	180°	23–24 September
Hanlu	195°	8–9 October
Shuangjiang	210°	23–24 October
Lidong	225°	7–8 November
Xiaoxue	240°	22–23 November
Daxue	255°	7–8 December
Dongzhi	270°	21–22 December
Xiaohan	285°	5–6 January
Dahan	300°	20–21 January

The traditional chinese calendar divides a year into 24 solar terms.

Yǔshuǐ / 雨水, Usui, Usu, or Vũ thủy, literally meaning rain water, is the second solar term.

It begins when the Sun reaches the celestial longitude of 330° and ends when it reaches the longitude of 345°. It more often refers in particular to the day when the Sun is exactly at the celestial longitude of 330°.

In the gregorian calendar, it usually begins around 18 February (19 February of / in east Asia time) and ends around 5 March.

== Pentads ==
Each solar term can be divided into three pentads (候), first (初候), second (次候) and last (末候) ones.

In Yushui each pentad includes :

in China,

- first pentad / 獺祭魚 : 'otters make offerings of fish'. As fish begin to swim upstream, they are hunted by otters, which are believed to offer the fish to heaven;
- second pentad / 鴻雁來 : 'the wild geese arrive'. Wild geese begin to make their northward migration, following the onset of spring;
- last pentad / 草木萌動 : 'trees and grass put forth shoots';

in Japan,

- first pentad / 土脉潤起;
- second pentad / 霞始靆;
- last pentad / 草木萠動.

== Date and time ==
Date and Time of Yushui (at UTC+08)
Year	Begin	End
丙申	2016-02-19 13:33	2016-03-05 11:43
丁酉	2017-02-18 19:31	2017-03-05 17:32
戊戌	2018-02-19 01:18	2018-03-05 23:28
己亥	2019-02-19 07:04	2019-03-06 05:09
庚子	2020-02-19 12:57	2020-03-05 10:57
辛丑	2021-02-18 18:44	2021-03-05 16:53
壬寅	2022-02-19 00:43	2022-03-05 22:43
癸卯	2023-02-19 06:34	2023-03-06 04:36
甲辰	2024-02-19 12:13	2024-03-05 10:22
乙巳	2025-02-18 18:06	2025-03-05 16:07
丙午	2026-02-18 23:51	2026-03-05 21:58
丁未	2027-02-19 05:33	2027-03-06 03:39
戊申	2028-02-19 11:25	2028-03-05 09:24
己酉	2029-02-18 17:07	2029-03-05 15:17
庚戌	2030-02-18 23:00	2030-03-05 21:03
辛亥	2031-02-19 04:51	2031-03-06 02:51
壬子	2032-02-19 10:32	2032-03-05 08:40
癸丑	2033-02-18 16:34	2033-03-05 14:32
甲寅	2034-02-18 22:30	2034-03-05 20:32
乙卯	2035-02-19 04:16	2035-03-06 02:22
丙辰	2036-02-19 10:14	2036-03-05 08:11

Preceded by Lichun (立春)	Solar term (節氣)	Succeeded by Jingzhe (驚蟄)
