= Dashu (solar term) =

Twelfth solar term of traditional East Asian calendars

Chinese name
- Chinese: 大暑
- Literal meaning: major heat
Transcriptions
Standard Mandarin
- Hanyu Pinyin: dàshǔ
- Bopomofo: ㄉㄚˋ ㄕㄨˇ
Hakka
- Pha̍k-fa-sṳ: Thai-chhú
Yue: Cantonese
- Yale Romanization: daaih syú
- Jyutping: daai^{6} syu^{2}
Southern Min
- Hokkien POJ: Tāi-sú / Tāi-sír / Tāi-sí
Eastern Min
- Fuzhou BUC: Duâi-*sṳ̄
Northern Min
- Jian'ou Romanized: Duōi-sṳ̿

Vietnamese name
- Vietnamese alphabet: đại thử
- Chữ Hán: 大暑

Korean name
- Hangul: 대서
- Hanja: 大暑
Transcriptions
- Revised Romanization: daeseo

Mongolian name
- Mongolian Cyrillic: их халуун
- Mongolian script: ᠶᠡᠬᠡ ᠬᠠᠯᠠᠭᠤᠨ

Japanese name
- Kanji: 大暑
- Hiragana: たいしょ
Transcriptions
- Romanization: taisho

Manchu name
- Manchu script: ᠠᠮᠪᠠ ᡥᠠᠯᡥᡡᠨ
- Möllendorff: amba halhūn

Solar term
Term	Longitude	Dates
Lichun	315°	4–5 February
Yushui	330°	18–19 February
Jingzhe	345°	5–6 March
Chunfen	0°	20–21 March
Qingming	15°	4–5 April
Guyu	30°	20–21 April
Lixia	45°	5–6 May
Xiaoman	60°	21–22 May
Mangzhong	75°	5–6 June
Xiazhi	90°	21–22 June
Xiaoshu	105°	7–8 July
Dashu	120°	22–23 July
Liqiu	135°	7–8 August
Chushu	150°	23–24 August
Bailu	165°	7–8 September
Qiufen	180°	23–24 September
Hanlu	195°	8–9 October
Shuangjiang	210°	23–24 October
Lidong	225°	7–8 November
Xiaoxue	240°	22–23 November
Daxue	255°	7–8 December
Dongzhi	270°	21–22 December
Xiaohan	285°	5–6 January
Dahan	300°	20–21 January

The traditional Chinese calendar divides a year into 24 solar terms. Dàshǔ (Chinese: 大暑; pinyin: dàshǔ), Taisho, Daeseo, or Đại thử (Chinese and Japanese: 大暑; pinyin: dàshǔ; rōmaji: taisho; Korean: 대서; romaja: daeseo; Vietnamese: đại thử; "major heat") is the 12th solar term. It begins when the Sun reaches the celestial longitude of 120° and ends when it reaches the longitude of 135°. It more often refers in particular to the day when the Sun is exactly at the celestial longitude of 120°. In the Gregorian calendar, it usually begins around 22 July (23 July Chinese lunisolar calendar time) and ends around 7 August.

== Date and time ==
Date and Time of Dashu (at UTC+08)
Year	Begin	End
丙申	2016-07-22 17:30	2016-08-07 09:53
丁酉	2017-07-22 23:15	2017-08-07 15:39
戊戌	2018-07-23 05:00	2018-08-07 21:30
己亥	2019-07-23 10:50	2019-08-08 03:13
庚子	2020-07-22 16:37	2020-08-07 09:06
辛丑	2021-07-22 22:26	2021-08-07 14:54
壬寅	2022-07-23 04:07	2022-08-07 20:29
癸卯	2023-07-23 09:50	2023-08-08 02:23
甲辰	2024-07-22 15:44	2024-08-07 08:09
乙巳	2025-07-22 21:29	2025-08-07 13:51
丙午	2026-07-23 03:13	2026-08-07 19:42
丁未	2027-07-23 09:04	2027-08-08 01:26
戊申	2028-07-22 14:54	2028-08-07 07:21
己酉	2029-07-22 20:42	2029-08-07 13:11
庚戌	2030-07-23 02:25	2030-08-07 18:47
辛亥	2031-07-23 08:10	2031-08-08 00:43
壬子	2032-07-22 14:05	2032-08-07 06:33
癸丑	2033-07-22 19:52	2033-08-07 12:15
甲寅	2034-07-23 01:36	2034-08-07 18:09
乙卯	2035-07-23 07:28	2035-08-07 23:54
丙辰	2036-07-22 13:22	2036-08-07 05:49

Preceded by Xiaoshu (小暑)	Solar term (節氣)	Succeeded by Liqiu (立秋)
