= Xiaoshu =

Eleventh solar term of traditional East Asian calendars

Chinese name
- Chinese: 小暑
- Literal meaning: minor heat
Transcriptions
Standard Mandarin
- Hanyu Pinyin: xiǎoshǔ
- Bopomofo: ㄒㄧㄠˇ ㄕㄨˇ
Hakka
- Pha̍k-fa-sṳ: Séu-chhú
Yue: Cantonese
- Yale Romanization: síu syú
- Jyutping: siu^{2} syu^{2}
Southern Min
- Hokkien POJ: Siáu-sú / Siáu-sír / Siáu-sí
Eastern Min
- Fuzhou BUC: Siēu-sṳ̄
Northern Min
- Jian'ou Romanized: Siǎu-sṳ̿

Vietnamese name
- Vietnamese alphabet: tiểu thử
- Chữ Hán: 小暑

Korean name
- Hangul: 소서
- Hanja: 小暑
Transcriptions
- Revised Romanization: soseo

Mongolian name
- Mongolian Cyrillic: бага халуун
- Mongolian script: ᠪᠠᠭ᠎ᠠ ᠬᠠᠯᠠᠭᠤᠨ

Japanese name
- Kanji: 小暑
- Hiragana: しょうしょ
Transcriptions
- Romanization: shōsho

Manchu name
- Manchu script: ᠠᠵᡳᡤᡝ ᡥᠠᠯᡥᡡᠨ
- Möllendorff: ajige halhūn

Solar term
Term	Longitude	Dates
Lichun	315°	4–5 February
Yushui	330°	18–19 February
Jingzhe	345°	5–6 March
Chunfen	0°	20–21 March
Qingming	15°	4–5 April
Guyu	30°	20–21 April
Lixia	45°	5–6 May
Xiaoman	60°	21–22 May
Mangzhong	75°	5–6 June
Xiazhi	90°	21–22 June
Xiaoshu	105°	7–8 July
Dashu	120°	22–23 July
Liqiu	135°	7–8 August
Chushu	150°	23–24 August
Bailu	165°	7–8 September
Qiufen	180°	23–24 September
Hanlu	195°	8–9 October
Shuangjiang	210°	23–24 October
Lidong	225°	7–8 November
Xiaoxue	240°	22–23 November
Daxue	255°	7–8 December
Dongzhi	270°	21–22 December
Xiaohan	285°	5–6 January
Dahan	300°	20–21 January

Xiǎoshǔ (in chinese) or Shōsho, Soseo, Tiểu thử is the 11th solar term, in the traditional chinese lunisolar calendar which divides a year into 24 ones.

It begins when the Sun reaches the celestial longitude of 105° (more often referring in particular to the precise day when our star is exactly at this one), and ends when it reaches the 120th (in the Gregorian calendar it usually begins around 7 July and ends around 22 July or 23 in East Asia time).

== Date and time ==
Date and Time of Xiaoshu (at UTC+08)
Year	Begin	End
丙申	2016-07-07 00:04	2016-07-22 17:30
丁酉	2017-07-07 05:50	2017-07-22 23:15
戊戌	2018-07-07 11:41	2018-07-23 05:00
己亥	2019-07-07 17:20	2019-07-23 10:50
庚子	2020-07-06 23:14	2020-07-22 16:37
辛丑	2021-07-07 05:05	2021-07-22 22:26
壬寅	2022-07-07 10:38	2022-07-23 04:07
癸卯	2023-07-07 16:30	2023-07-23 09:50
甲辰	2024-07-06 22:20	2024-07-22 15:44
乙巳	2025-07-07 04:05	2025-07-22 21:29
丙午	2026-07-07 09:57	2026-07-23 03:13
丁未	2027-07-07 15:37	2027-07-23 09:04
戊申	2028-07-06 21:30	2028-07-22 14:54
己酉	2029-07-07 03:22	2029-07-22 20:42
庚戌	2030-07-07 08:55	2030-07-23 02:25
辛亥	2031-07-07 14:49	2031-07-23 08:10
壬子	2032-07-06 20:41	2032-07-22 14:05
癸丑	2033-07-07 02:24	2033-07-22 19:52
甲寅	2034-07-07 08:18	2034-07-23 01:36
乙卯	2035-07-07 14:01	2035-07-23 07:28
丙辰	2036-07-06 19:57	2036-07-22 13:22

Preceded by xiazhi (夏至)	solar term (節氣)	Succeeded by dashu (大暑)
