= Xiazhi =

Tenth solar term of traditional East Asian calendars

Chinese name
- Chinese: 夏至
- Literal meaning: "summer's extreme" (i.e. summer solstice)
Transcriptions
Standard Mandarin
- Hanyu Pinyin: xiàzhì
- Bopomofo: ㄒㄧㄚˋ ㄓˋ
- IPA: [ɕjâ.ʈʂɻ̩̂]
Hakka
- Pha̍k-fa-sṳ: ha-chṳ
Yue: Cantonese
- Yale Romanization: haah ji
- Jyutping: haa^{6} zi^{3}
- IPA: [ha˨.tsi˧]
Southern Min
- Hokkien POJ: hā-chì / hē-chì / hēe-chì
Eastern Min
- Fuzhou BUC: hâ-cé
Northern Min
- Jian'ou Romanized: hā-ci̿

Vietnamese name
- Vietnamese alphabet: hạ chí
- Chữ Hán: 夏至

Korean name
- Hangul: 하지
- Hanja: 夏至
Transcriptions
- Revised Romanization: haji

Mongolian name
- Mongolian Cyrillic: зуны туйл
- Mongolian script: ᠵᠤᠨ ᠤ ᠲᠤᠢᠯ

Japanese name
- Kanji: 夏至
- Hiragana: げし
Transcriptions
- Romanization: geshi

Manchu name
- Manchu script: ᠵᡠᠸᠠᡵᡳ ᡨᡝᠨ
- Möllendorff: juwari ten

Solar term
Term	Longitude	Dates
Lichun	315°	4–5 February
Yushui	330°	18–19 February
Jingzhe	345°	5–6 March
Chunfen	0°	20–21 March
Qingming	15°	4–5 April
Guyu	30°	20–21 April
Lixia	45°	5–6 May
Xiaoman	60°	21–22 May
Mangzhong	75°	5–6 June
Xiazhi	90°	21–22 June
Xiaoshu	105°	7–8 July
Dashu	120°	22–23 July
Liqiu	135°	7–8 August
Chushu	150°	23–24 August
Bailu	165°	7–8 September
Qiufen	180°	23–24 September
Hanlu	195°	8–9 October
Shuangjiang	210°	23–24 October
Lidong	225°	7–8 November
Xiaoxue	240°	22–23 November
Daxue	255°	7–8 December
Dongzhi	270°	21–22 December
Xiaohan	285°	5–6 January
Dahan	300°	20–21 January

Xiàzhì is the 10th solar term, and marks the summer solstice, in the traditional Chinese lunisolar calendar dividing a year into 24 solar terms.

It begins when the Sun reaches the celestial longitude of 90° and ends when it reaches the longitude of 105°. The word xiazhi most often refers specifically to the day when the Sun is exactly at the celestial longitude of 90°. In the Gregorian calendar, this is around 21 June, and the Xiazhi period ends with the beginning of the next solar term, Xiaoshu, around 7 July.

Xiazhi is considered the middle of the summer and the beginning of the hottest part of summer. Although it was once celebrated with traditional customs, these customs have mostly died out, and Xiazhi is not observed much anymore.

== Pentads ==
Each solar term can be divided into three pentads (候) of about five days each: the first pentad (初候), second pentad (次候), and last pentad (末候).

Xiazhi's ones are:

- First pentad: Chinese: 鹿角解; pinyin: lù jiǎo jiě – deer antlers come off
- Second pentad: simplified Chinese: 蜩始鸣; traditional Chinese: 蜩始鳴; pinyin: tiáo shǐ míng – cicadas begin to chirp
- Last pentad: Chinese: 半夏生; pinyin: bàn xià shēng – midsummer comes, or Pinellia ternata grows

Separately from the pentads, the 15 days of Xiazhi were historically divided into three periods in a different way: a three-day initial period, a five-day middle period, and a seven-day final period. If it rained at the end of any of these periods, this was considered to be a bad sign for the year's harvest. If it did not rain at all during the 15-day Xiazhi period, this was considered a good sign for the harvest; if rain did fall, the most auspicious days for it to fall on were the first, fourth, fifth, ninth and tenth days of the period.

== History and traditional customs ==
Xiazhi is an ancient festival; records of its observance date back to the Han dynasty. People celebrated Xiazhi simply by taking a few days off for eating and drinking. Government officials in particular were able to rest for these days, while farmers still had work that needed to be done.

In ancient China, Xiazhi was not as important a date as Dongzhi (the winter solstice, celebrated with the Dongzhi Festival), and its celebrations were less elaborate. In the Song dynasty, according to the historian and government official Pang Yuanying, Xiazhi was a three-day holiday; this is in contrast to Dongzhi, which was a weeklong holiday at the time.

The Liang dynasty scholar Zong Lin wrote that on Xiazhi farmers should burn chrysanthemum leaves and sprinkle the ashes on their wheat plants as a form of natural disinfectant to prevent plant diseases or pests.

The Xiazhi "Nine Nines Song" (九九歌; Jiǔ Jiǔ Gē), dating back at least to the Song dynasty, has multiple variations, one of which goes as follows:

One nine, two nines, the fan doesn't leave your hand;
Three nines, twenty-seven, drinking water is as sweet as honey;
Four nines, thirty-six, wiping away sweat is like coming out of a bath;
Five nines, forty-five, yellow leaves dance above;
Six nines, fifty-four, cool off in a Buddhist temple;
Seven nines, sixty-three, look for the sheets at the bedside;
Eight nines, seventy-two, think about using a blanket;
Nine nines, eighty-one, every household makes charcoal;
Get ready for winter.

一九二九扇子不离手；
三九二十七，饮水甜如蜜；
四九三十六，拭汗如出浴；
五九四十五，头带黄叶舞；
六九五十四，乘凉入佛寺；
七九六十三，床头寻被单；
八九七十二，思量盖夹被；
九九八十一，家家打炭基；
准备过冬了。

In the mid-20th century, the American sociologist Wolfram Eberhard wrote that "the ordinary citizen is hardly even aware" of Xiazhi celebrations, but that in the past, government officials did make sacrifices on this day. According to Eberhard, it was formerly prohibited to light large fires or smelt iron on this day.

In modern times, these traditional customs have largely been lost, and Xiazhi is generally ignored. This is in contrast to the winter solstice festival, Dongzhi, which continues to be actively observed in modern times.

== Food ==
In much of China, it is traditional to eat noodles on Xiazhi; a popular saying says "jiaozi on Dongzhi; noodles on Xiazhi" (冬至饺子夏至面). An alternative saying about Xiazhi foods goes "Dumplings for the first nine days, noodles for the second nine days, and pancake with eggs for the third nine days" (头伏饺子二伏面，三伏烙饼摊鸡蛋).

Other Xiazhi foods vary by region: for instance in Taizhou, Zhejiang, it is traditional to eat maiyouzhi (麦油脂; màiyóuzhī; a kind of spring roll), yanggao (漾糕; yànggāo; a kind of small sticky cake), and dumplings.

== Date and time ==
Date and Time of Xiazhi (at UTC+08)
Year	Begin	End
丙申	2016-06-21 06:34	2016-07-07 00:04
丁酉	2017-06-21 12:24	2017-07-07 05:50
戊戌	2018-06-21 18:07	2018-07-07 11:41
己亥	2019-06-21 23:54	2019-07-07 17:20
庚子	2020-06-21 05:43	2020-07-06 23:14
辛丑	2021-06-21 11:32	2021-07-07 05:05
壬寅	2022-06-21 17:14	2022-07-07 10:38
癸卯	2023-06-21 22:57	2023-07-07 16:30
甲辰	2024-06-21 04:51	2024-07-06 22:20
乙巳	2025-06-21 10:42	2025-07-07 04:05
丙午	2026-06-21 16:25	2026-07-07 09:57
丁未	2027-06-21 22:11	2027-07-07 15:37
戊申	2028-06-21 04:01	2028-07-06 21:30
己酉	2029-06-21 09:48	2029-07-07 03:22
庚戌	2030-06-21 15:31	2030-07-07 08:55
辛亥	2031-06-21 21:17	2031-07-07 14:49
壬子	2032-06-21 03:08	2032-07-06 20:41
癸丑	2033-06-21 09:01	2033-07-07 02:24
甲寅	2034-06-21 14:44	2034-07-07 08:18
乙卯	2035-06-21 20:33	2035-07-07 14:01
丙辰	2036-06-21 02:32	2036-07-06 19:57

== Solstice ==
The solstices (as well as the equinoxes) mark the middle of the seasons in traditional East Asian calendars.

Here, the Chinese character 至 / zhì (in pinyin) means "extreme", so the term "xiazhi", for the summer solstice, directly signifies the "zenith of summer".

== See also ==
- Lixia (45°)
- midsummer
- solstice

Preceded by Mangzhong (芒種)	Solar term (節氣)	Succeeded by Xiaoshu (小暑)
