= Jingzhe =

Third solar term of traditional East Asian calendars

Chinese name
- Traditional Chinese: 驚蟄
- Simplified Chinese: 惊蛰
- Literal meaning: awakening of insects
Transcriptions
Standard Mandarin
- Hanyu Pinyin: jīng zhé
- Bopomofo: ㄐㄧㄥ ㄓㄜˊ
Hakka
- Pha̍k-fa-sṳ: Kiâng-chhṳt
Yue: Cantonese
- Yale Romanization: gīng jaht
- Jyutping: ging^{1} zat^{6}
Southern Min
- Hokkien POJ: Keng-ti̍p
Eastern Min
- Fuzhou BUC: Gĭng-dĭk
Northern Min
- Jian'ou Romanized: Géng-tì

Vietnamese name
- Vietnamese alphabet: kinh trập
- Chữ Hán: 驚蟄

Korean name
- Hangul: 경칩
- Hanja: 驚蟄
Transcriptions
- Revised Romanization: gyeongchip

Mongolian name
- Mongolian Cyrillic: ичигсэд хөдлөх
- Mongolian script: ᠢᠴᠡᠭᠰᠡᠳ ᠬᠥᠳᠡᠯᠬᠦ

Japanese name
- Kanji: 啓蟄
- Hiragana: けいちつ
Transcriptions
- Romanization: keichitsu

Manchu name
- Manchu script: ᡠᠮᡳᠶᠠᡥᠠ ᠠᡧᡧᠠᠮᠪᡳ
- Möllendorff: umiyaha aššambi

Solar term
Term	Longitude	Dates
Lichun	315°	4–5 February
Yushui	330°	18–19 February
Jingzhe	345°	5–6 March
Chunfen	0°	20–21 March
Qingming	15°	4–5 April
Guyu	30°	20–21 April
Lixia	45°	5–6 May
Xiaoman	60°	21–22 May
Mangzhong	75°	5–6 June
Xiazhi	90°	21–22 June
Xiaoshu	105°	7–8 July
Dashu	120°	22–23 July
Liqiu	135°	7–8 August
Chushu	150°	23–24 August
Bailu	165°	7–8 September
Qiufen	180°	23–24 September
Hanlu	195°	8–9 October
Shuangjiang	210°	23–24 October
Lidong	225°	7–8 November
Xiaoxue	240°	22–23 November
Daxue	255°	7–8 December
Dongzhi	270°	21–22 December
Xiaohan	285°	5–6 January
Dahan	300°	20–21 January

Jīngzhé (simplified Chinese: 惊蛰; traditional Chinese: 驚蛰) is the 3rd of the 24 solar terms (節氣) in the traditional Chinese calendars. It begins when the Sun reaches the celestial longitude of 345° and ends when it reaches the longitude of 360°. More often, it refers to the day when the Sun is exactly at a celestial longitude of 345°. In the Gregorian calendar, it usually begins around March 5 and ends around March 20.

The word 驚蟄 means the awakening of hibernating insects. 驚 is to startle and 蟄 means hibernating insects. Traditional Chinese folklore says that during Jingzhe, thunderstorms will wake up the hibernating insects, which implies that the weather is getting warmer.

== Pentads ==
Each solar term can be divided into 3 pentads (候). They are the first pentad (初候), the second pentad (次候), and the third pentad (末候): Pentads in Jingzhe are

China

- First pentad: traditional Chinese: 桃始華; simplified Chinese: 桃始华 (pīnyīn: Táo shǐ huá), 'The peaches begin to blossom'.
- Second pentad: traditional Chinese: 倉庚鳴; simplified Chinese: 仓庚鸣 (pīnyīn: Cāng gēng míng), 'Orioles sing clearly'.
- Last pentad: traditional Chinese: 鷹化為鳩; simplified Chinese: 鹰化为鸠 (pīnyīn: Yīng huà wéi jiū), 'Eagles are transformed into doves'.

Japan

- First pentad: Japanese: 蟄虫啓戸 (Romanisation: Chitchū kei to), 'Awakening of hibernating insects'.
- Second pentad: Japanese: 桃始笑 (Romanisation: Momo Hajime Emi), 'Peach trees start to bloom (smile)'.
- Last pentad: Japanese: 菜虫化蝶 (Romanisation: Na mushi-ka chō), 'Caterpillars become butterflies'.

== Date and time ==
Date and Time of Jingzhe (at UTC+08)
Year	Begin	End
丙申	2016-03-05 11:43	2016-03-20 12:30
丁酉	2017-03-05 17:32	2017-03-20 18:28
戊戌	2018-03-05 23:28	2018-03-21 00:15
己亥	2019-03-06 05:09	2019-03-21 05:58
庚子	2020-03-05 10:57	2020-03-20 11:50
辛丑	2021-03-05 16:53	2021-03-20 17:37
壬寅	2022-03-05 22:43	2022-03-20 23:33
癸卯	2023-03-06 04:36	2023-03-21 05:24
甲辰	2024-03-05 10:22	2024-03-20 11:06
乙巳	2025-03-05 16:07	2025-03-20 17:01
丙午	2026-03-05 21:58	2026-03-20 22:45
丁未	2027-03-06 03:39	2027-03-21 04:25
戊申	2028-03-05 09:24	2028-03-20 10:17
己酉	2029-03-05 15:17	2029-03-20 16:01
庚戌	2030-03-05 21:03	2030-03-20 21:51
辛亥	2031-03-06 02:51	2031-03-21 03:41
壬子	2032-03-05 08:40	2032-03-20 09:22
癸丑	2033-03-05 14:32	2033-03-20 15:23
甲寅	2034-03-05 20:32	2034-03-20 21:17
乙卯	2035-03-06 02:22	2035-03-21 03:03
丙辰	2036-03-05 08:11	2036-03-20 09:02

== Related topics ==
- Villain hitting

== Cultural references ==
Lim Giong has a 2005 album titled Insects Awaken.

Jingzhe (film) is a 2004 Chinese film directed by Wang Quan'an.

Preceded by Yushui (雨水)	Solar term (節氣)	Succeeded by Chunfen (春分)
