= Nanping dialect =

Mandarin dialect of Fujian, China

- Nanping Mandarin
- Native to: People's Republic of China
- Region: Yanping District, Nanping, Fujian
- Native speakers: 20,000 (2012)
- Language family: Sino-Tibetan: Sinitic; Chinese; Mandarin; Nanping dialect

Language codes
- ISO 639-3: –
- Linguasphere: 79-AAA-bj

The Nanping dialect (simplified Chinese: 南平话; traditional Chinese: 南平話; pinyin: Nánpínghuà), or Nanping Mandarin (南平官话; 南平官話; Nánpíng Guānhuà), is a dialect of Mandarin Chinese spoken in Yanping District, in Nanping, Fujian. Locally, it is known as Tuguanhua (土官话; 土官話; Tǔguānhuà; 'local official speech'). It is one of three Mandarin dialect islands in Fujian.

== History and distribution ==
In the past, Nanping Mandarin had great influence in northern Fujian. During the Republican Era, this dialect of Mandarin was taught as the standard in many schools in the area. However, since Yanping is surrounded by areas where Eastern and Northern Min are spoken, the areas where Nanping Mandarin is still spoken has shrunk down. During the Second Sino-Japanese War, when Fuzhou was under Japanese control, many people moved from Fuzhou into Nanping, and because of closer association with the provincial capital since the founding of the People's Republic of China, Fuzhounese became more popular, and speakers of Nanping Mandarin became fewer in number.

Nanping Mandarin is still spoken in these parts of Yanping District:

- the centre of the district;
- the seat of Xiqin Town;
- parts of Shuinan Subdistrict, including Baxian, Geping, Lingxia Bridge and Houlingxia;
- Jixi, in Nanshan Town.

== Phonology ==
=== Consonants ===
There are fourteen consonants in the phonemic inventory:

		Bilabial	Dental	Velar	Glottal
Stop	unaspirated	/p/	/t/	/k/	/ʔ/
Stop	aspirated	/pʰ/	/tʰ/	/kʰ/	
Affricate	unaspirated		/ts/		
Affricate	aspirated		/tsʰ/		
Fricative			/s/	/x/	
Nasal		/m/		/ŋ/	
Lateral			/l/		

A more conservative form of the dialect also includes /tʃ/, /tʃʰ/ and /ʃ/, which are contrastive to /ts/, /tsʰ/ and /s/, e.g. 知 /tʃɹ̩˧/ ≠ 资 /tsɹ̩˧/.

=== Tones ===
Nanping Mandarin is traditionally considered to have five tones by diachronic convention, but it may be analyzed as having four phonemic tones.
