= Solar term =

Any of 24 moments in traditional East Asian lunisolar calendars

The Twenty-Four Solar Terms—— knowledge in China of time and practices developed through observation of the sun’s annual motion
- UNESCO Intangible Cultural Heritage
- Country: China
- Reference: 647
- Region: Asia and the Pacific

Inscription history
- Inscription: 2013 (11th session)
- List: Representative
- UNESCO Cultural Heritage

(Twenty-four) solar terms

Chinese name
- Traditional Chinese: （二十四）節氣
- Simplified Chinese: （二十四）节气
Transcriptions
Standard Mandarin
- Hanyu Pinyin: (èrshísì) jiéqì
- Wade–Giles: (erh-shih-ssŭ) chieh-chi
- IPA: ([âɚ.ʂɻ̩̌.sɹ̩̂]) [tɕjě.tɕʰî]
Yue: Cantonese
- Jyutping: (ji^{6} sap^{6} sei^{3}) zit^{3} hei^{3}
Southern Min
- Hokkien POJ: (jī-cha̍p-sì) cheh-khùi

Korean name
- Hangul: （이십사）절기
- Hanja: （二十四）節氣
Transcriptions
- Revised Romanization: (i-sip-sa) jeolgi

Japanese name
- Kanji: （二十四）節気
- Kana: （にじゅうし）せっき
Transcriptions
- Romanization: (nijūshi) sekki

Solar term
Term	Longitude	Dates
Lichun	315°	4–5 February
Yushui	330°	18–19 February
Jingzhe	345°	5–6 March
Chunfen	0°	20–21 March
Qingming	15°	4–5 April
Guyu	30°	20–21 April
Lixia	45°	5–6 May
Xiaoman	60°	21–22 May
Mangzhong	75°	5–6 June
Xiazhi	90°	21–22 June
Xiaoshu	105°	7–8 July
Dashu	120°	22–23 July
Liqiu	135°	7–8 August
Chushu	150°	23–24 August
Bailu	165°	7–8 September
Qiufen	180°	23–24 September
Hanlu	195°	8–9 October
Shuangjiang	210°	23–24 October
Lidong	225°	7–8 November
Xiaoxue	240°	22–23 November
Daxue	255°	7–8 December
Dongzhi	270°	21–22 December
Xiaohan	285°	5–6 January
Dahan	300°	20–21 January

A solar term (or jiéqì, traditional Chinese: 節氣; simplified Chinese: 节气) is any of twenty-four moments in traditional Chinese lunisolar calendars that matches a particular astronomical event and signifies some natural phenomenon. The points are spaced 15° apart along the ecliptic and are used by Chinese lunisolar calendar to stay synchronized with the seasons, which is crucial for agrarian societies. The solar terms are also used to calculate intercalary months; which month is repeated depends on the position of the sun at the time.

According to the Book of Documents (書經; Shūjīng), the first determined term was Dongzhi (Winter Solstice) by Dan, the Duke of Zhou (周公旦; Zhōu Gōng Dàn), while he was trying to locate the geological center of the Western Zhou dynasty, by measuring the length of the sun's shadow on an ancient type of sundial called tǔguī (土圭). Then four terms of seasons were set, which were soon evolved as eight terms; not until the Taichu Calendar of 104 BC were all twenty-four solar terms officially included in the Chinese calendar.

Because the Sun's speed along the ecliptic varies depending on the Earth-Sun distance, the number of days that it takes the Sun to travel between each pair of solar terms varies slightly throughout the year, but it is always between 15 and 16 days. Each solar term is divided into three pentads (候; hòu), so there are 72 pentads in a year, consisting of five, rarely six, days. Most of them are named after phenological (biological or botanical) phenomena corresponding to the pentad.

Solar terms originated in China, then spread to Korea, Vietnam, and Japan, countries in the East Asian cultural sphere. Although each term was named based on the seasonal changes of climate in the North China Plain, peoples living in the different climates still use it without changes. This is exhibited by the fact that traditional Chinese characters for most of the solar terms are identical.

On December 1, 2016, the solar terms were listed by UNESCO as an Intangible Cultural Heritage.

== Numbering ==
The solar terms used to mark the midpoint of the month (marked with "Z", for Chinese: 中氣; pinyin: zhōngqì ) are considered the major terms, while the solar terms used to mark the start of the month (marked with "J", for Chinese: 節氣; pinyin: jiéqì ) are deemed minor. The year starts with Lichun (J1) and ends with Dahan (Z12).

== Multilingual list ==
Season	Chinese zodiac & Earthly Branch of Month	Sun's ecliptic longitude	Chinese name	Korean name	Vietnamese name	Japanese name	Ryukyuan (Okinawan) name	English name (Hong Kong Observatory)	English name (CCTV)	Gregorian Date (± 1 day)	Reference for Month Intercalating	Corresponding Western astrological sign
Spring 春季 chūnjì	Tiger (虎); Yín (寅)	315°	立春 lìchūn	立春 (입춘/립춘) ipchun/ripchun	Lập xuân (立春)	立春（りっしゅん） risshun	立春（りっしゅん） risshun	Spring commences	Beginning of Spring	Feb 4	1st month initial	Aquarius
Spring 春季 chūnjì	Tiger (虎); Yín (寅)	330°	雨水 yǔshuǐ	雨水 (우수) usu	Vũ thủy (雨水)	雨水（うすい） usui	雨水（うしー） ushii	Rain water	Rain Water	Feb 19	1st month midpoint	Pisces
Spring 春季 chūnjì	Rabbit (兔); Mǎo (卯)	345°	驚蟄 (惊蛰) jīngzhé	驚蟄 (경칩) gyeongchip	Kinh trập (驚蟄)	啓蟄（けいちつ） keichitsu	驚く（うどぅるく） uduruku; 驚くー（おどるくー） udurukuu; 虫驚（むしうどぅるく） mushi'uduruku	Insects waken	Awakening of Insects	Mar 6	2nd month initial	Pisces
Spring 春季 chūnjì	Rabbit (兔); Mǎo (卯)	0°	春分 chūnfēn	春分 (춘분) chunbun	Xuân phân (春分)	春分（しゅんぶん） shunbun	春分（すんぶん） sunbun	Vernal equinox	Spring Equinox	Mar 21	2nd month midpoint	Aries
Spring 春季 chūnjì	Dragon (龍); Chén (辰)	15°	清明 qīngmíng	淸明 (청명) cheongmyeong	Thanh minh (清明)	清明（せいめい） seimei	清明（しーみー） shiimii	Bright and clear	Pure Brightness	Apr 5	3rd month initial	Aries
Spring 春季 chūnjì	Dragon (龍); Chén (辰)	30°	穀雨 (谷雨) gǔyǔ	穀雨 (곡우) gogu	Cốc vũ (穀雨)	穀雨（こくう） kokuu	穀雨（くくー） kukuu	Corn rain	Grain Rain	Apr 20	3rd month midpoint	Taurus
Summer 夏季 xiàjì	Snake (蛇); Sì (巳)	45°	立夏 lìxià	立夏 (입하/립하) ipha/ripha	Lập hạ (立夏)	立夏（りっか） rikka	立夏（りっかー） rikkaa	Summer commences	Beginning of Summer	May 6	4th month initial	Taurus
Summer 夏季 xiàjì	Snake (蛇); Sì (巳)	60°	小滿 (小满) xiǎomǎn	小滿 (소만) soman	Tiểu mãn (小滿)	小満（しょうまん） shōman	小満（すーまん） suuman	Corn forms	Grain Buds	May 21	4th month midpoint	Gemini
Summer 夏季 xiàjì	Horse (馬); Wǔ (午)	75°	芒種 (芒种) mángzhòng	芒種 (망종) mangjong	Mang chủng (芒種)	芒種（ぼうしゅ） bōshu	芒種（ぼーすー） boosuu	Corn on ear	Grain in Ear	Jun 6	5th month initial	Gemini
Summer 夏季 xiàjì	Horse (馬); Wǔ (午)	90°	夏至 xiàzhì	夏至 (하지) haji	Hạ chí (夏至)	夏至（げし） geshi	夏至（かーちー） kaachii	Summer solstice	Summer Solstice	Jun 21	5th month midpoint	Cancer
Summer 夏季 xiàjì	Goat (羊); Wèi (未)	105°	小暑 xiǎoshǔ	小暑 (소서) soseo	Tiểu thử (小暑)	小暑（しょうしょ） shōsho	小暑（くーあちさ） kuu'achisa	Moderate heat	Minor Heat	Jul 7	6th month initial	Cancer
Summer 夏季 xiàjì	Goat (羊); Wèi (未)	120°	大暑 dàshǔ	大暑 (대서) daeseo	Đại thử (大暑)	大暑（たいしょ） taisho	大暑（うーあちさ） uu'achisa	Great heat	Major Heat	Jul 23	6th month midpoint	Leo
Autumn 秋季 qiūjì	Monkey (猴); Shēn (申)	135°	立秋 lìqiū	立秋 (입추/립추) ipchu/ripchu	Lập thu (立秋)	立秋（りっしゅう） risshū	立秋（りっすー） rissuu	Autumn commences	Beginning of Autumn	Aug 8	7th month initial	Leo
Autumn 秋季 qiūjì	Monkey (猴); Shēn (申)	150°	處暑 (处暑) chǔshǔ	處暑 (처서) cheoseo	Xử thử (處暑)	処暑（しょしょ） shosho	処暑（とぅくるあちさ） tukuru'achisa	End of heat	End of Heat	Aug 23	7th month midpoint	Virgo
Autumn 秋季 qiūjì	Rooster (雞); Yǒu (酉)	165°	白露 báilù	白露 (백로) baengno	Bạch lộ (白露)	白露（はくろ） hakuro	白露（ふぁくるー） fakuruu	White dew	White Dew	Sep 8	8th month initial	Virgo
Autumn 秋季 qiūjì	Rooster (雞); Yǒu (酉)	180°	秋分 qiūfēn	秋分 (추분) chubun	Thu phân (秋分)	秋分（しゅうぶん） shūbun	秋分（すーぶん） suubun	Autumnal equinox	Autumn Equinox	Sep 23	8th month midpoint	Libra
Autumn 秋季 qiūjì	Dog (狗); Xū (戌)	195°	寒露 hánlù	寒露 (한로) hallo	Hàn lộ (寒露)	寒露（かんろ） kanro	寒露（かんるー） kanruu	Cold dew	Cold Dew	Oct 8	9th month initial	Libra
Autumn 秋季 qiūjì	Dog (狗); Xū (戌)	210°	霜降 shuāngjiàng	霜降 (상강) sanggang	Sương giáng (霜降)	霜降（そうこう） sōkō	霜降（しむくだり） shimukudari	Frost	Frost's Descent	Oct 23	9th month midpoint	Scorpio
Winter 冬季 dōngjì	Pig (豬); Hài (亥)	225°	立冬 lìdōng	立冬 (입동/립동) ipdong/ripdong	Lập đông (立冬)	立冬（りっとう） rittō	立冬（りっとぅー） rittuu	Winter commences	Beginning of Winter	Nov 7	10th month initial	Scorpio
Winter 冬季 dōngjì	Pig (豬); Hài (亥)	240°	小雪 xiǎoxuě	小雪 (소설) soseol	Tiểu tuyết (小雪)	小雪（しょうせつ） shōsetsu	小雪（くーゆち） kuuyuchi	Light snow	Minor Snow	Nov 22	10th month midpoint	Sagittarius
Winter 冬季 dōngjì	Rat (鼠); Zǐ (子)	255°	大雪 dàxuě	大雪 (대설) daeseol	Đại tuyết (大雪)	大雪（たいせつ） taisetsu	大雪（うーゆち） uuyuchi	Heavy snow	Major Snow	Dec 7	11th month initial	Sagittarius
Winter 冬季 dōngjì	Rat (鼠); Zǐ (子)	270°	冬至 dōngzhì	冬至 (동지) dongji	Đông chí (冬至)	冬至（とうじ） tōji	冬至（とぅんじー） tunjii	Winter solstice	Winter Solstice	Dec 22	11th month midpoint	Capricorn
Winter 冬季 dōngjì	Ox (牛); Chǒu (丑)	285°	小寒 xiǎohán	小寒 (소한) sohan	Tiểu hàn (小寒)	小寒（しょうかん） shōkan	小寒（すーかん） suukan	Moderate cold	Minor Cold	Jan 6	12th month initial	Capricorn
Winter 冬季 dōngjì	Ox (牛); Chǒu (丑)	300°	大寒 dàhán	大寒 (대한) daehan	Đại hàn (大寒)	大寒（だいかん） daikan	大寒（でーかん） deekan	Severe cold	Major Cold	Jan 20	12th month midpoint	Aquarius

== Chinese mnemonic song ==
The "Song of Solar Terms" (traditional Chinese: 節氣歌; simplified Chinese: 节气歌; pinyin: jiéqìgē) is used to ease the memorization of jieqi:

Traditional Chinese

春雨驚春清穀天
夏滿芒夏暑相連
秋處露秋寒霜降
冬雪雪冬小大寒
每月兩節不變更
最多相差一兩天
上半年來六、廿一
下半年是八、廿三

Simplified Chinese

春雨惊春清谷天
夏满芒夏暑相连
秋处露秋寒霜降
冬雪雪冬小大寒
每月两节不变更
最多相差一两天
上半年来六、廿一
下半年是八、廿三

Pinyin

chūn yǔ jīng chūn qīng gǔ tiān,
xià mǎn máng xià shǔ xiāng lián,
qiū chù lù qiū hán shuāng jiàng,
dōng xuě xuě dōng xiǎo dà hán.
měi yuè liǎng jié bù biàn gēng,
zùi duō xiāng chā yī liǎng tiān
shàng bàn nián lái liù, niàn yī
xià bàn nián shì bā, niàn sān

The first four lines provides a concise version of the names of the 24 jieqi. The last four lines provide some rules of thumb about the Gregorian dates of jieqi, namely:

- Two jieqi per month;
- Gregorian dates are off by one or two days at most;
- In the first half of the year, jieqi happens around the 6th and 21st day of each (Gregorian) month;
- In the second half of the year, jieqi happens around the 8th and 23rd day of each (Gregorian) month.

== Determination ==
Chart with the solar terms and their Vietnamese names

The modern definition using ecliptic longitudes, introduced by the Shixian calendar, is known as dìngqì fǎ (定氣法; 'steady term method'). Under this method, the determination of solar terms is similar to the astronomical determination of the special cases of equinox and solstice dates, with different ecliptic longitudes to solve for. One can start with an approximation and then perform a correction using the anomalies and mean motion of the sun. The JPL Horizons On-Line Ephemeris System may be used to query for exact times of solar terms.

The older method, called the píngqì fǎ (平氣法; 'equal term method'), simply divides the tropical year into 24 equal parts.

== See also ==
- Chinese calendar
- Korean calendar
- Japanese calendar
- Vietnamese calendar
- Wheel of the Year
