= Mangzhong =

Ninth solar term of traditional East Asian calendars

Chinese name
- Traditional Chinese: 芒種
- Simplified Chinese: 芒种
- Literal meaning: grain in ear
Transcriptions
Standard Mandarin
- Hanyu Pinyin: mángzhòng
- Bopomofo: ㄇㄤˊ ㄓㄨㄥˋ
Hakka
- Pha̍k-fa-sṳ: Miòng-chung / Mòng-chung
Yue: Cantonese
- Yale Romanization: mòhng júng
- Jyutping: mong^{4} zung^{2}
Southern Min
- Hokkien POJ: Bông-chéng
Eastern Min
- Fuzhou BUC: Mòng-cṳ̄ng
Northern Min
- Jian'ou Romanized: Mông-ce̤̿ng

Vietnamese name
- Vietnamese alphabet: mang chủng
- Chữ Hán: 芒種

Korean name
- Hangul: 망종
- Hanja: 芒種
Transcriptions
- Revised Romanization: mangjong

Mongolian name
- Mongolian Cyrillic: буудай боловсрох
- Mongolian script: ᠪᠤᠭᠤᠳᠠᠢ ᠪᠣᠯᠪᠠᠰᠤᠷᠠᠬᠤ

Japanese name
- Kanji: 芒種
- Hiragana: ぼうしゅ
Transcriptions
- Romanization: bōshu

Manchu name
- Manchu script: ᠮᠠᡳᠰᡝ ᡠᡵᡝᠮᠪᡳ
- Möllendorff: maise urembi

Solar term
Term	Longitude	Dates
Lichun	315°	4–5 February
Yushui	330°	18–19 February
Jingzhe	345°	5–6 March
Chunfen	0°	20–21 March
Qingming	15°	4–5 April
Guyu	30°	20–21 April
Lixia	45°	5–6 May
Xiaoman	60°	21–22 May
Mangzhong	75°	5–6 June
Xiazhi	90°	21–22 June
Xiaoshu	105°	7–8 July
Dashu	120°	22–23 July
Liqiu	135°	7–8 August
Chushu	150°	23–24 August
Bailu	165°	7–8 September
Qiufen	180°	23–24 September
Hanlu	195°	8–9 October
Shuangjiang	210°	23–24 October
Lidong	225°	7–8 November
Xiaoxue	240°	22–23 November
Daxue	255°	7–8 December
Dongzhi	270°	21–22 December
Xiaohan	285°	5–6 January
Dahan	300°	20–21 January

Mangzhong (simplified Chinese: 芒种; traditional Chinese: 芒種; pinyin: Mángzhòng) is the ninth of twenty-four solar terms in the Chinese calendar year. It begins when the Sun reaches the celestial longitude of 75 degrees, which usually occurs around 5 June in the Gregorian calendar. The name can be used to refer to the first day, or to the whole period of the solar term, which ends when the sun reaches the longitude of 90 degrees, approximately on 21 June. The solar terms signify important agricultural dates, and Mangzhong marks the period for seed sowing.

Mangzhong has a cognate of Mang chủng, and was recently popularized without historical recognition in Vietnam. It is also known as Bōshu in Japanese and Mangjong in Korean.

== History and origins ==
In Chinese, Mangzhong means "Grain in Ear". Mang means "grain," and is also synonymous with the word for "busy" (忙; máng). It signifies that farmers have to return to the fields and work intensively. "Grain in ear" also means that grains have matured. During this period, awny crops such as wheat ripen. As flowers withered away, communities held ceremonies making sacrifices to the "God of Flowers," showing their gratitude and eagerness to see flowers again the following year. This custom has died out, and can only be read about in ancient texts. Mangzhong is especially important for farmers, heralding a period of intense agricultural activity. A common saying from Guizhou illustrates this urgency: "If you don't plant rice in the grain in the ear, your planting will be in vain." This saying underscores the significance of timely sowing, as Mangzhong represents the peak time for seeding millet and serves as the deadline for various planting tasks.

== Physical phenomena ==
During the Mangzhong period, areas around the middle stream and downstream of the Yangtze River enter the rainy season. Sensing the moisture, mantises appear, shrikes start to sing, and mockingbirds cease chirping.

== Traditions and customs ==
In China's southern Anhui province, people steam dumplings with new fresh wheat flour after seeding the paddy rice. They make the flour into different shapes such as cereals, animals, vegetables, and fruits, color them, and pray for villagers' safety.

According to traditional Chinese doctors, the best food to eat during the Mangzhong period is mulberry. Around two thousand years ago, the mulberry was considered 'royal food' and was sometimes called the "holy fruit". Silkworms eat mulberry as well.

== Date and time ==
Date and Time of Mangzhong (at UTC+08)
Year	Begin	End
丙申	2016-06-05 13:48	2016-06-21 06:34
丁酉	2017-06-05 19:36	2017-06-21 12:24
戊戌	2018-06-06 01:29	2018-06-21 18:07
己亥	2019-06-06 07:06	2019-06-21 23:54
庚子	2020-06-05 12:58	2020-06-21 05:43
辛丑	2021-06-05 18:52	2021-06-21 11:32
壬寅	2022-06-06 00:25	2022-06-21 17:14
癸卯	2023-06-06 06:18	2023-06-21 22:57
甲辰	2024-06-05 12:10	2024-06-21 04:51
乙巳	2025-06-05 17:56	2025-06-21 10:42
丙午	2026-06-05 23:49	2026-06-21 16:25
丁未	2027-06-06 05:25	2027-06-21 22:11
戊申	2028-06-05 11:16	2028-06-21 04:01
己酉	2029-06-05 17:10	2029-06-21 09:48
庚戌	2030-06-05 22:44	2030-06-21 15:31
辛亥	2031-06-06 04:35	2031-06-21 21:17
壬子	2032-06-05 10:28	2032-06-21 03:08
癸丑	2033-06-05 16:13	2033-06-21 09:01
甲寅	2034-06-05 22:07	2034-06-21 14:44
乙卯	2035-06-06 03:50	2035-06-21 20:33
丙辰	2036-06-05 09:46	2036-06-21 02:32

Preceded by Xiaoman (小滿)	Solar term (節氣)	Succeeded by Xiazhi (夏至)
