= Northern Min =

Chinese language

- Min Bei
- Mâing-bă̤-ngṳ̌/閩北語
- Native to: China
- Region: Nanping (northwest Fujian)
- Native speakers: 2.5 million (2004)
- Language family: Sino-Tibetan: Sinitic; Chinese; Min; Inland Min; Northern Min
- Early forms: Proto-Sino-Tibetan: Old Chinese (Note: Min is believed to have split from Old Chinese, rather than Middle Chinese like other varieties of Chinese.); Proto-Min
- Dialects: Jian'ou; Jianyang; Chong'an; Songxi; Zhenghe
- Writing system: Kienning Colloquial Romanized (Jian'ou dialect)

Language codes
- ISO 639-3: mnp
- Glottolog: minb1236
- Linguasphere: 79-AAA-ha
- Northern Min

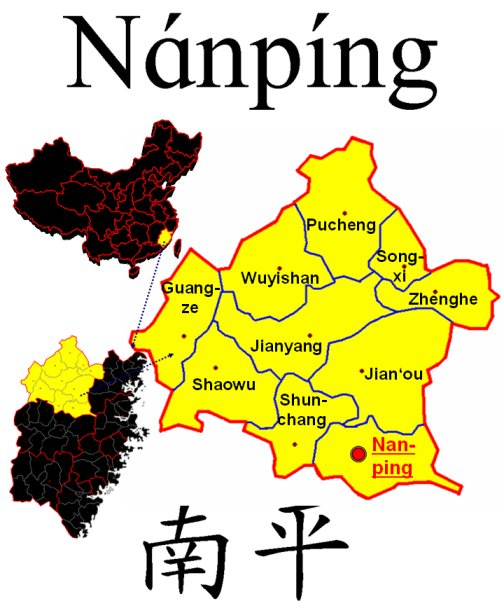
- Counties of Nanping prefecture, Fujian

Northern Min (simplified Chinese: 闽北; traditional Chinese: 閩北; pinyin: Mǐnběi) is a group of mutually intelligible Min varieties spoken in Nanping prefecture of northwestern Fujian.

== Classification and distribution ==
Early classifications of varieties of Chinese, such as those of Li Fang-Kuei in 1937 and Yuan Jiahua in 1960, divided Min into Northern and Southern subgroups. However, in a 1963 report on a survey of Fujian, Pan Maoding and colleagues argued that the primary split was between inland and coastal groups. In a reclassification that has been followed by most dialectologists since, they restricted the term Northern Min to inland dialects of Nanping prefecture, and classified the coastal dialects of Fuzhou and Ningde as Eastern Min.

According to the Language Atlas of China, Northern Min varieties are spoken throughout the counties of Wuyishan (formerly Chong'an), Jianyang, Jian'ou, Zhenghe and Songxi, in the southern part of Pucheng County and the northeastern part of Shunchang County, and in Yanping District except for the Nanping dialect of the urban area of Nanping, which is an island of an isolated Mandarin dialect of uncertain affinity. The Jianyang and Jian'ou dialects are often taken as representative.

Although coastal Min varieties can be derived from a proto-language with four series of stop or affricate initials at each point of articulation (e.g. /t/, /tʰ/, /d/ and /dʱ/), Northern Min varieties contain traces of two further series, one voiced and the other voiceless. In Northern Min dialects, these initials have a different tonal development from other stops and affricates, though the details vary between varieties. Moreover, although in Jian'ou and Zhenghe these initials yield voiceless unaspirated initials (as in coastal varieties), they yield voiced sonorants or the zero initial in Jianyang and Wuyishan. Because of these reflexes, Jerry Norman called these initials "softened" stops and affricates.
