= Vowel breaking =

Process by which monophthongs become diphthongs and triphthongs

In historical linguistics, vowel breaking, vowel fracture, or diphthongization is the sound change of a monophthong into a diphthong or triphthong: the tongue gliding in one or more directions within the same syllable.

== Types ==
Vowel breaking may be unconditioned or conditioned. It may be triggered by the presence of another sound, by stress, or in no particular way.

=== Assimilation ===
Vowel breaking is sometimes defined as a subtype of diphthongization, when it refers to harmonic (assimilatory) process that involves diphthongization triggered by a following vowel or consonant.

The original pure vowel typically breaks into two segments. The first segment matches the original vowel, and the second segment is harmonic with the nature of the triggering vowel or consonant. For example, the second segment may be /u/ (a back vowel) if the following vowel or consonant is back (such as velar or pharyngeal), and the second segment may be /i/ (a front vowel) if the following vowel or consonant is front (such as palatal).

Thus, vowel breaking, in the restricted sense, can be viewed as an example of assimilation of a vowel to a following vowel or consonant.

=== Unconditioned ===
Vowel breaking is sometimes not assimilatory and is then not triggered by a neighboring sound. That was the case with the Great Vowel Shift in English in which all cases of /iː/ and /uː/ changed to diphthongs.

=== Stress ===
Vowel breaking sometimes occurs only in stressed syllables. For instance, Vulgar Latin open-mid /ɛ/ and /ɔ/ changed to diphthongs only when they were stressed.

== Indo-European languages ==
=== English ===
Vowel breaking is a very common sound change in the history of the English language, occurring at least three times (with some varieties adding more) listed here in reverse chronological order:

==== Geordie ====
In Geordie, the /iː/ and /uː/ vowels undergo an allophonic split, with the monophthongs [iː], [uː ~ ʉː] being used in morphologically-closed syllables (as in freeze [fɹiːz], bruise [bɹuːz ~ bɹʉːz]) and the diphthongs [ei], [ɵʊ] being used in morphologically-open syllables word-finally (as in free [fɹei], brew [bɹɵʊ]) but also word-internally at the end of a morpheme (as in frees [fɹeiz], brews [bɹɵʊz]).

Most dialects of English turn /iː/, /uː/ into diphthongs, and the monophthongal [iː], [uː ~ ʉː ~ ɨː] are in free variation with the diphthongal [ɪi ~ əi], [ʊu ~ ʊ̈ʉ ~ ɪ̈ʉ ~ ɪ̈ɨ], particularly word-internally. Word-finally, diphthongs are more usual.

==== Southern American English ====
Vowel breaking is characteristic of the "Southern drawl" of Southern American English, where the short front vowels have developed a glide up to [j], and then in some areas back down to schwa: pat [pæjət], pet [pɛjət], pit [pɪjət].

==== Non-rhotic dialects ====
The centering diphthongs of dialects like Received Pronunciation (RP) developed as a result of breaking before historic /r/, which was subsequently deleted at the end of a syllable: near /nɪə̯/, square /skwɛə̯/, cure /kjʊə̯/.

==== Great Vowel Shift ====
The Great Vowel Shift changed the long vowels /iː uː/ to diphthongs, which became Modern English /aɪ aʊ/.

- Old English īs > Modern English ice /aɪs/
- Old English hūs > Modern English house /haʊs/

==== Middle English ====
In early Middle English, a vowel /i/ was inserted between a front vowel and a following /h/ (pronounced [ç] in this context), and a vowel /u/ was inserted between a back vowel and a following /h/ (pronounced [x] in this context).

That is a prototypical example of the narrow sense of "vowel breaking" as described above: the original vowel breaks into a diphthong that assimilates to the following consonant, gaining a front /i/ before a palatal consonant and /u/ before a velar consonant.

==== Old English ====
In Old English, two forms of harmonic vowel breaking occurred: breaking and retraction and back mutation.

In prehistoric Old English, breaking and retraction changed stressed short and long front vowels i, e, æ to short and long diphthongs spelled io, eo, ea when followed by h or by r, l + another consonant (short vowels only), and sometimes w (only for certain short vowels):

- Proto-Germanic *fallan > Anglo-Frisian *fællan > Old English feallan "fall"
- PG *erþō > OE eorþe "earth"
- PG *lizaną > OE liornian "learn"

In late prehistoric Old English, back mutation changed short front i, e, æ to short diphthongs spelled io, eo, ea before a back vowel in the next syllable if the intervening consonant was of a certain nature. The specific nature of the consonants that trigger back umlaut or block it varied from dialect to dialect.

=== Old Frisian ===
Old West Frisian exhibited several vowel breaking processes. One is a process called "Jorwert breaking" where long front vowels followed by w were converted into rising diphthongs. This means that [iːw], [eːw], and [ɛːw] were converted into [juːw], [joːw], and [jɔːw], respectively. Sometimes the j was deleted if it followed an r.

In another process, called "late Old West Frisian breaking", consonant clusters where l preceded d, k, n, or r, the preceding e was lengthened, diphthongized, and stress shifted to the second syllable. This process can be seen in examples such as feld lengthening to fēld before breaking into fiēld; stress originally fell on the first syllable, then shifted to the final syllable.

=== German and Yiddish ===
The long high vowels of Middle High German underwent breaking during the transition to Early New High German: /iː yː uː/ → /aɪ̯ ɔʏ̯ aʊ̯/. In Yiddish, the diphthongization affected the long mid vowels as well: /ɛː oː øː iː yː uː/ → /ɛɪ̯ ɔɪ̯ ɛɪ̯ aɪ̯ aɪ̯ ɔɪ̯/

- MHG êwic → NHG ewig, Yiddish: אייביק, romanized: eybik ("eternal")
- MHG hôch → NHG hoch, Yiddish: הויך, romanized: hoykh ("high")
- MHG schœne → NHG schön, Yiddish: שיין, romanized: sheyn ("nice")
- MHG snîden → NHG schneiden, Yiddish: שנײַדן, romanized: shnaydn ("to cut")
- MHG vriunt → NHG Freund, Yiddish: פֿרײַנד, romanized: fraynd ("friend")
- MHG hût → NHG Haut, Yiddish: הויט, romanized: hoyt ("skin")

This change started as early as the 12th century in Upper Bavarian and reached Moselle Franconian only in the 16th century. It did not affect Alemannic or Ripuarian dialects, which still retain the original long vowels.

In Yiddish, the diphthongization applied not only to MHG long vowels but also to /ɛː oː/ in words of Hebrew (in stressed open syllables) or Slavic origin:

- Hebrew: פסח, romanized: pésach → Yiddish: פּסח, romanized: peysekh ("Pesach")
- Hebrew: מנורה, romanized: m'norá → Yiddish: מנורה, romanized: mnoyre ("menorah")
- Old Czech: chřěn → Yiddish: כריין, romanized: khreyn ("chrain")
- Polish: kosz → Yiddish: קויש, romanized: koysh ("basket")

Earlier, in Old High German, the West Germanic ō (/oː/) and ē (/eː/, from Proto-Germanic ē₂) became diphthongs uo and ie in stressed syllables, a trait shared with Old Dutch (but not Old Saxon):

- PWG *flōdu → OHG fluot, OD fluot (versus Old Saxon flōd) ("flow, flood")
- PWG *hēr → OHG hier, OD hier (versus Old Saxon hēr) ("here")

=== Old Norse ===
Proto-Germanic stressed short e becomes ja or (before u) jǫ regularly in Old Norse except after w, r, l. Examples are:

- PG *ek(a) "I" → (east) ON jak, Swedish jag, Danish and Norwegian Bokmål jeg, and Icelandic ek → ég (but Jutlandic æ, a, Nynorsk eg).
  - Faroese has both. The standard form is eg, while the dialects of Suðuroy have jeg.
- PG *hertōn "heart" → ON hjarta, Swedish hjärta, Faroese hjarta, Norwegian Nynorsk hjarta, Danish hjerte
- PG *erþō "earth" → Proto-Norse *erþū → ON jǫrð, Swedish, Danish, Norwegian jord, Faroese jørð

According to some scholars, the diphthongisation of e is an unconditioned sound change, whereas other scholars speak about epenthesis or umlaut.

==== Faroese ====
Inherited Old Norse stressed long vowels and short a became diphthongs in open syllables in Modern Faroese: close and mid vowels became falling diphthongs ending in /i̯/ or /u̯/ (í/ý, ó, ú > /ʊiː, ɔuː~ɛuː, ʉuː/), but the open vowels a, æ (< Old Norse ǽ and é) and á (< Old Norse á and ǫ́) became floating diphthongs /ɛaː/ or /ɔaː/ respectively:

- ON faðir → Faroese faðir "father" /ˈfɛaːjɪɹ/, cf. Svabo's 1773 orthography Fêaïr, Fêajir.*
- ON tré → Faroese træ "tree" /ˈtʰɹɛaː/, cf. Svabo's 1773 orthography Trêa.*
- ON ǽʀ → Faroese ær "ewe" /ˈɛaːɹ/, cf. Svabo's 1773 orthography Êar.*
- ON bátʀ → Faroese bátur "boat" /ˈb̥ɔaːʰtʊɹ/, cf. Svabo's 1773 orthography Baatur.
- ON þú → Faroese tú "thou; you (sg.)" /ˈtʰʉuː/, cf. Svabo's 1773 orthography tû.
- ON móðir → Faroese móðir "mother" /ˈmɔuːʋɪɹ~ˈmɛuːʋɪɹ/, cf. Svabo's 1773 orthography Mêuïr, Mêuür.*
- ON íss → Faroese ísur "ice" /ˈʊiːsʊɹ/, cf. Svabo's 1773 orthography Ujsur.
- ON ýsa → Faroese hýsa "haddock" /ˈhʊiːsa/, cf. Svabo's 1773 orthography Hujsa.

Note: Svabo notes the diphthongs êa, êu with circumflex over both letters: e᷍a, e᷍u.

Diphthongisation of ON í and ý /ʊi/ appears also in closed syllables; ON ó, ú in closed syllable lost its diphthongal character during the beginning of the 19th century:

- ON hvítt → Faroese hvítt "white (n.)" /ˈkʰʋʊiʰtː/, cf. Svabo's 1773 orthography kvujt, kvujtt.
- ON nýtt → Faroese nýtt "new (n.)" /ˈnʊiʰtː/, cf. Svabo's 1773 orthography nujt.
- ON stórt → Faroese stórt "big (n.)" /ˈstœɻ̊t~ˈstɔɻ̊t/, cf. Svabo's 1773 orthography stêurt, størt, Schrøter's 1822 orthography stourt.

=== Scottish Gaelic ===
Vowel breaking is present in Scottish Gaelic with the following changes occurring often but variably between dialects: Archaic Irish Middle Irish pronunciation: [eː] → Scottish Gaelic Scottish Gaelic pronunciation: [iə] and Archaic Irish oː → Scottish Gaelic [uə] Specifically, central dialects have more vowel breaking than others.

=== Romance languages ===
Many Romance languages underwent vowel breaking. The Vulgar Latin open vowels e /ɛ/ and o /ɔ/ in stressed position underwent breaking only in open syllables in French and Italian, but in both open and closed syllables in Spanish. Vowel breaking was mostly absent in Catalan, in which /ɛ/ and /ɔ/ became diphthongs only before a palatal consonant: Latin coxa 'thigh', octō 'eight', lectum 'bed' > Old Catalan */kuoiʃa/, */uoit/, */lieit/. The middle vowel was subsequently lost if a triphthong was produced: Modern Catalan cuixa, vuit, llit (cf. Portuguese coxa, oito, leito). Vowel breaking was completely absent in Portuguese. The result of breaking varies between languages: e and o became ie and ue in Spanish, ie and uo in Italian and ie and eu /ø/ in French.

In the table below, words with breaking are bolded.

Syllable shape	Latin	Spanish	French	Italian	Portuguese	Catalan
Open	petram, focum	piedra, fuego	pierre, feu	pietra, fuoco	pedra, fogo	pedra, foc
Closed	festam, portam	fiesta, puerta	fête, porte	festa, porta	festa, porta	festa, porta

==== Romanian ====
Romanian underwent the general Romance breaking only with /ɛ/, as it did not have /ɔ/:

- Latin pellis > Romanian piele "skin"

It underwent a later breaking of stressed e and o to ea and oa before a mid or open vowel:

- Latin porta > Romanian poartă "gate"
- Latin flōs (stem flōr-) > Romanian floare "flower"

Sometimes a word underwent both forms of breaking in succession:

- Latin petra > Early Romanian pietră > Romanian piatră "stone" (where ia results from hypothetical *iea)

The diphthongs that resulted from the Romance and the Romanian breakings were modified when they occurred after palatalized consonants.

==== Quebec French ====
In Quebec French, long vowels are generally diphthongized when followed by a consonant in the same syllable (even when a final [ʁ] is optionally made silent).

- tard [tɑːʁ] → [tɑɔ̯ʁ]; but not in tardif (because short a)
- père [pɛːʁ] → [paɛ̯ʁ]
- fleur [flœːʁ] → [flɶœ̯ʁ]; but not in fleuriste (long œ is at end of syllable)
- fort [fɔːʁ] → [fɑɔ̯ʁ]; but not forte (short o)
- autre [oːtʁ̥] → [ou̯tʁ̥]; but not autrement (long o is at end of syllable)
- neutre [nøːtʁ̥] → [nøy̯tʁ̥]; but not neutralité (long ø is at end of syllable)
- pince [pɛ̃ːs] → [pãɛ̃s]; or [pẽːs] → [pẽɪ̯̃s]; but not pincer
- onze [õːz] → [õʊ̯̃z]; but not onzième

=== Proto-Indo-European ===
Some scholars believe that Proto-Indo-European (PIE) i, u had vowel-breaking before an original laryngeal in Greek, Armenian and Tocharian but that the other Indo-European languages kept the monophthongs:

- PIE *gʷih_{3}wos → *gʷioHwos "alive" → Gk. ζωός zōós, Toch. B śāw-, śāy- (but Skt. jīvá-, Lat. vīvus)
- PIE *protih_{3}kʷom → *protioHkʷom "front side" → Gk. πρόσωπον prósōpon "face", Toch. B pratsāko "breast" (but Skt. prátīka-)
- PIE *duh_{2}ros → *duaHros "long" → Gk. δηρός dērós, Arm. *twār → erkar (Skt. dūrá-, Lat. dūrus).

However, the hypothesis has not been widely adopted.

== Austronesian languages ==
Some languages in Sumatra have vowel breaking processes, almost exclusively in syllable-final position. In Minangkabau, the Proto-Malayic vowels *i and *u are broken to ia and ua before word-final *h, *k, *l, *ŋ, *r (*təlur > *təluar > talua "egg"). In Rejang, the Proto-Malayo-Polynesian vowels *ə, i, and u are broken to êa, ea, and oa before any of the word-final consonants mentioned above except *k and *ŋ (*tənur > *tənoar > tênoa "egg"). This process has been transphonologized by loss of *l and *r and merging of several word-final consonants into a glottal stop (*p, *t, *k in Minangkabau, or *k, *h in most dialects of Rejang except Kebanagung).

Word-final Proto-Malayo-Polynesian *-i and *-u were also broken in Sumatra. In Rejang, these vowels are broken into -ai and -au in Pesisir dialect, or into -êi and -êu elsewhere.

Although Acehnese is also spoken in Sumatra, the entire Chamic family has undergone vowel breaking separately. Final open *-i and *-u were broken in Proto-Chamic into *-ɛy and *-ɔw. However, they remained when closed by another consonant (final *-r was lost in native words). The following are the outcomes for the diphthongs:

	Acehnese	Rade	Jarai	Chru	Northern Roglai	Tsat	Western Cham	Phan Rang Cham
*ɛy	ɔə	ɛi	əi			ai	ay	ɛ̆y
*ɔw	ɛə	ău	əu			au~ə	au	ɔ̆w

Following its split from Proto-Chamic, several daughter languages have undergone further vowel breaking. In Acehnese, *a: normally became ɯə, but when preceded by a nasal, it became ɯ instead.

== See also ==
- Smoothing (phonetics)
- Unpacking (linguistics)

== Bibliography ==
- Crowley, Terry. (1997) An Introduction to Historical Linguistics. 3rd edition. Oxford University Press.
- Thurgood, Graham (1999). From Ancient Cham to Modern Dialects: Two Thousand Years of Language Contact and Change: With an Appendix of Chamic Reconstructions and Loanwords. Oceanic Linguistics Special Publications. University of Hawai'i Press. pp. i, iii–vii, ix–xiii, xv–xvii, 1–259, 261–275, 277–397, 399–407. ISBN 0824821319. JSTOR 20006770.
