= Jarai =

Jarai may refer to:

- Jarai people
- Jarai language
