= Haroi language =

Austronesian language spoken in Vietnam

Haroi
- Native to: Vietnam
- Ethnicity: Haroi
- Native speakers: 35,000 (2007)
- Language family: Austronesian: Malayo-Polynesian; Malayo-Sumbawan (?); Chamic; Coastal; Haroi

Language codes
- ISO 639-3: hro
- Glottolog: haro1237
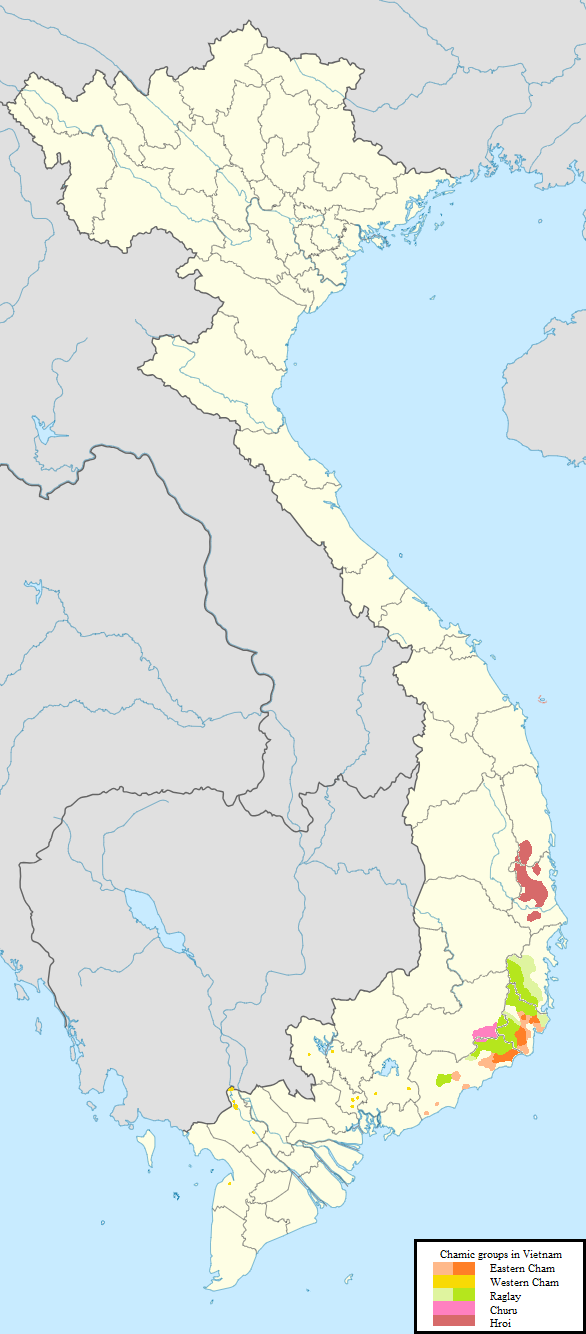
- Current distribution of Cham, Haroi, Roglai and Chru speakers in Vietnam

Haroi (Hroi) is a Chamic language of the Austronesian family spoken in central Vietnam. It was reported in the 1970s to have approximately 10,000–15,000 speakers in western Phú Yên, Bình Định, and Phú Bổn provinces. Its exact position within the Chamic subgroup has been debated: Goschnick (1977) considered it difficult to classify, noting similarities with both Northern and Southern Chamic languages.

== Phonology ==
=== Vowels ===
Vowels of Haroi
| | Front | Central | Back |
|---|---|---|---|
| Close | i iː | ɨ ɨː | u uː |
| Near-close | ɪ ɪː | | ʊ ʊː |
| Close-mid | e eː | ə əː | o oː |
| Open-mid | ɛ | ə əː | ɔ ɔː |
| Open | | a aː | |

Short vowels are written using their IPA symbols, while long vowels are represented by the corresponding short vowel symbol with an added grave accent (e.g. /iː/ is written as ⟨ì⟩).

Diphthongs include /iə, iːə, eə, eːə, ɨə, ɨːə, uə, uːə, oə, oːə/.
