= Churu people =

Chu Ru
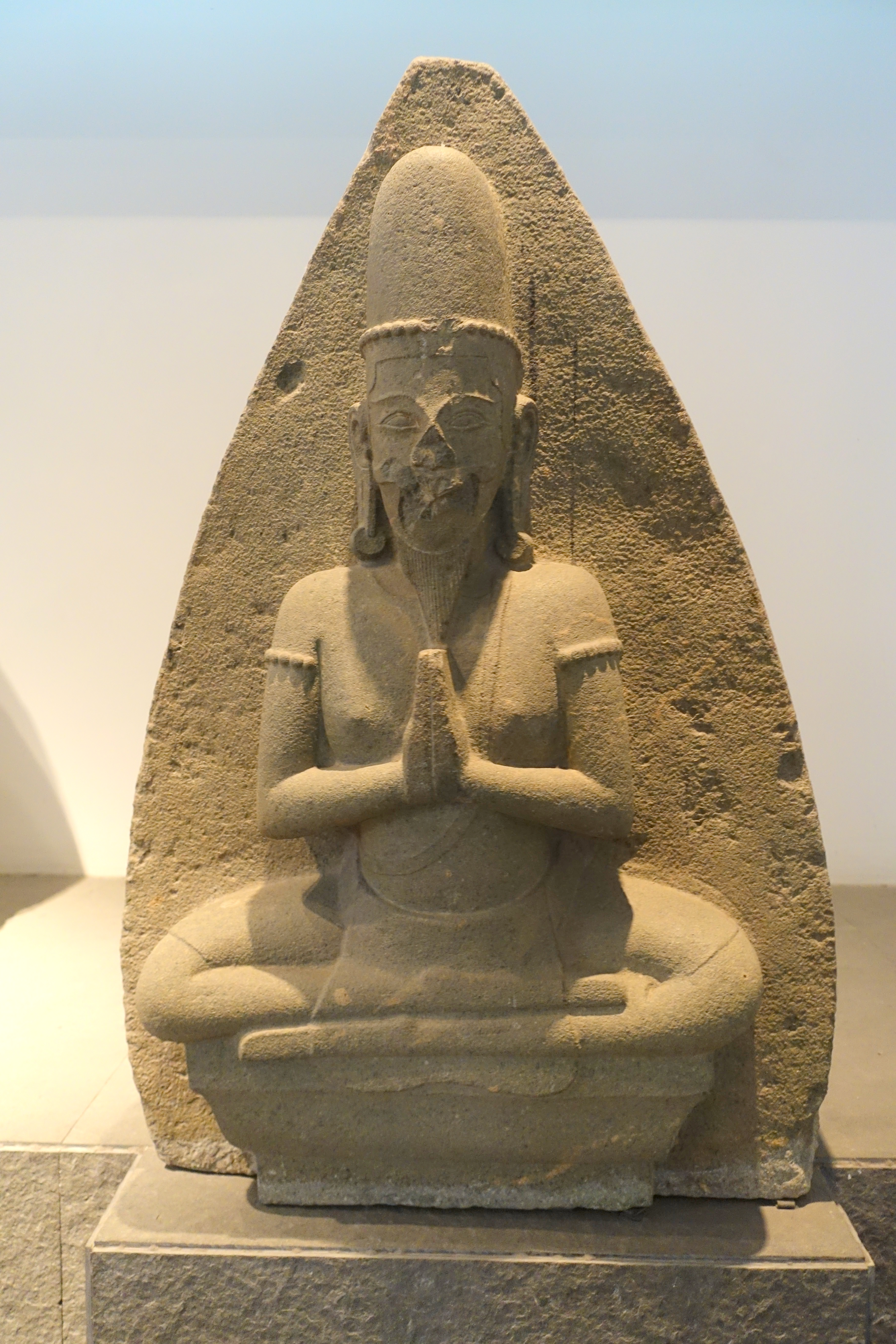
- Pediment with ascetic figure, Po Rome, Ninh Thuan, 14th-16th century AD, sandstone - Museum of Vietnamese History - HCMC

Total population
- Vietnam 23,242 (2019)

Regions with significant populations
- Lâm Đồng - Bình Thuận

Languages
- Chru; Koho; Vietnamese

Religion
- Ethnic religion (majority), Christianity, Islam

Related ethnic groups
- Chams and other Austronesian peoples

The Churu (or Chru) people are a Chams related ethnic group living mainly in Lâm Đồng, and Bình Thuận provinces of Central Vietnam. They speak Chru, a Malayo-Polynesian language. The word Churu means Land Expander in their language. The Churu's population was 23,242 in 2019.

Some Churu villages have close ties with the Kaho people, so they speak Koho fluently, and even prefer Koho to Chru.

During the French colonial period, the most influential highland leaders in Đà Lạt area were Churu. They were said to be the most advanced among the highlanders because of their historical links to the Chams.

== History ==
According to most of village elders of the Churu people in Lâm Đồng, their people were originally a group of close descendants of the Chams who lived in the South Central Coast of Vietnam. Amid constant wars with Khmer Empire and Đại Việt, the Cham aristocracy carried out exploiting their fellow laborers very badly. They forced the laborers to go deep into the forest to find ivory, rhino horn or go down to the river panning gold to tribute. Forced coolie recruit, soldier recruit constantly made the life of Cham farmers very hard. To avoid that heavy oppression and exploitation, some were forced to leave their homeland to find a new land. And they were the first immigrants who gave themselves the name Churu as it is today. They were the people who brought with them rice farming and pottery making of the Chams.

In Les Jungles Moï (The Montagnard Jungles), Henri Maitre commented that the Chams began to penetrate the Central Highlands since 1150 under the reign of Jaya Harivarman I, who defeated the Jarai people and Rhade people. After the fall of Vijaya at the end of Champa–Đại Việt War (1471), the rest of Vijaya royal family and clansman fled to Panduranga and started to conquer then govern the Raglai, Churu and Koho people in the nearby highlands.

Encouraged by Touneh Hàn Đăng, the Churu adopted some economic innovations from the Chams in the fields of weaving, pottery, and plowing in 1907.

== Economic activities ==
=== Farming ===
The Churu are mainly residents of wet rice cultivation, unlike other Lâm Đồng indigenous residents who cultivate slash-and-burn agriculture.

The Churu have long known to turn animal husbandry into an active support for agricultural farming. Livestock such as water buffaloes, cattle and horses are used not only for sacrificial rites but also as drafts animal and sources of manure. Metal and woodworking were practiced, allowing for the production of plows (Chru: lơngar), harrows (Chru: sơkăm) and agricultural implements.

The Churu also appreciate the importance of irrigation. The system of dams, large ditches, auxiliary ditches, leading to the fields of each family, clan, and the whole village is regularly repaired, renovated and upgraded. They often build retention dams by using soil, stones, and wood to block a stream or a tributary to store and regulate water for irrigation.

=== Hunting ===
The Churu people catch fish in several ways, one of which is pounding the roots of trees with poisonous resins and mixing them with spring water. In the idle farming months, Churu men go to the forest to hunt animals. They have a lot of experience in making poison arrows and traps for wild animals. Animals hunted with trap or crossbow include: pig, deer, monkey, weasel and other small animals. The form of collective hunting is often organized in many villages, but hunting is no longer popular today.

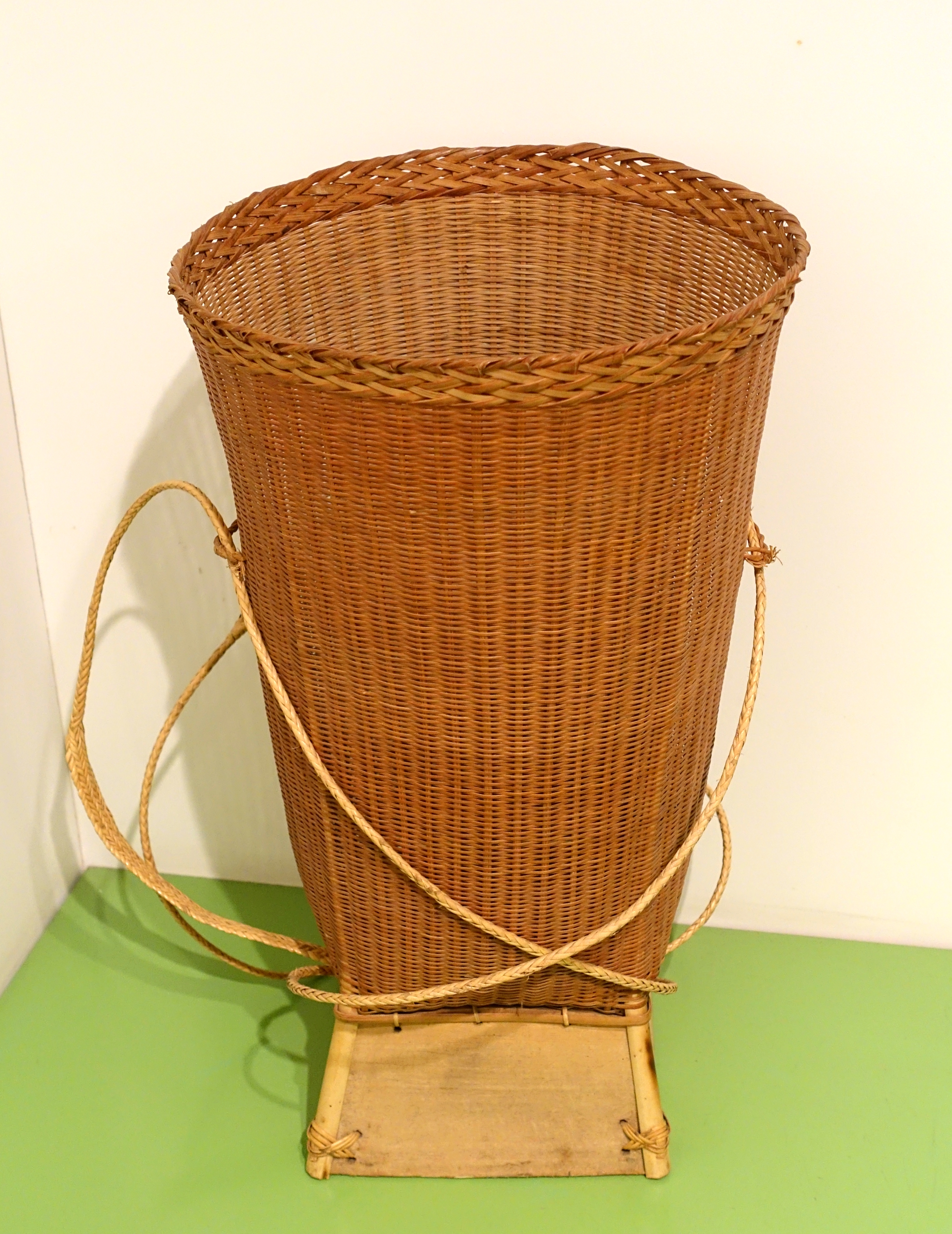
Basket with straps, Chu-ru, Đơn Dương, Lâm Đồng, 2000 - Vietnamese Women's Museum - Hanoi

Gathering is the work of women who traditionally go around with Austroasiatic carrying baskets on their back for various types of harvest. Wild vegetables and field vegetables make up the main part of the dishes. Bamboo shoots and some wild fruits are also commonly used foods. Dioscorea hamiltonii (Vietnamese: củ mài) are used as the main source of food in times of failed crop. The Churu also collect other forest products such as: Auricularia auricula-judae, mushrooms, honey, and Wurfbainia villosa.

== Culture and religion ==
The traditional religion of the Churu is animism. Deities are divided into two groupings, Yàng (land deities) and Pô (sky deities).

Bok Bơmung (festival in temple) is the biggest folk festival of the Churu, held in the second month of the lunar Year, lasting three days.

Islam was first recorded during the Katip Sumat uprising in 1833–4. Sumat (a Muslim Cham leader) had visited Kelantan. Upon his return, Islam was introduced to the Churu and Jarai peoples, fueling the Jihad movement against Đại Việt.

A number of Churu villages converted to Christianity in the 1950s with the arrival of missionaries.

== Notable persons ==
- Po Rome, the king of Champa ruled from 1627 to 1651, who harmonized Hindu and Muslim factions, forced peace between Chams communities under his reign. Po Rome was the 'first highland king' of the Cham people of Southeast Asia and the 'last figure to be deified' and have a Cham tower dedicated to his worship.
- Touneh Hàn Đăng, the chief of Montagnard district (Vietnamese: Huyện Thượng) in Lâm Viên province under the reign of King Bảo Đại (was Đơn Dương district, Tuyên Đức province under South Vietnam period, now is Đơn Dương district, Lâm Đồng province).
