= Raglai people =

Chamic ethnic group Vietnam

Raglai
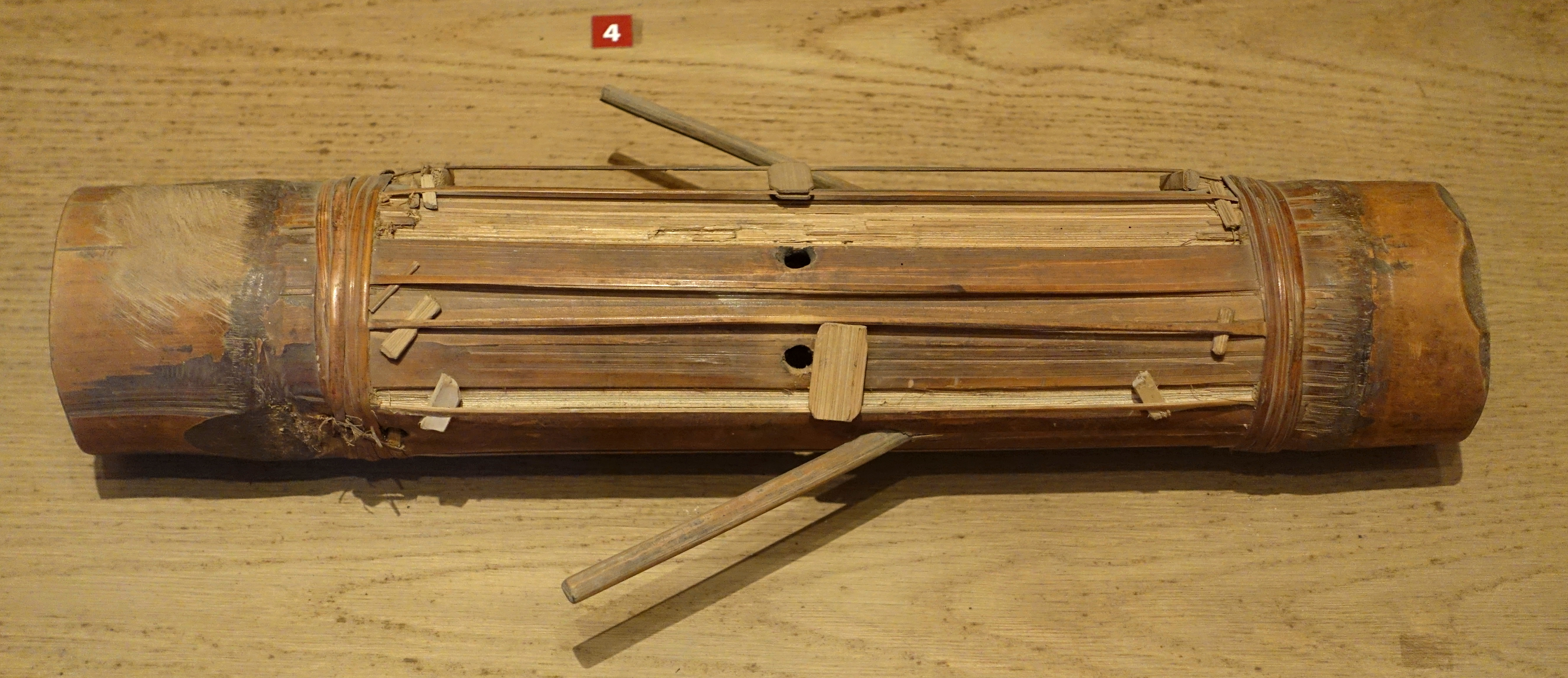
- Chapi - one-string zither of Raglai - Vietnam Museum of Ethnology - Hanoi

Total population
- Vietnam 146,613 (2019)

Regions with significant populations
- Khánh Hòa, Bình Thuận, Ninh Thuận

Languages
- Raglai; Vietnamese

Related ethnic groups
- Cham people; Jarai people

The Raglai (Vietnamese pronunciation: [rā ɣlāːj]) people are a Chamic ethnic group mainly living in Khánh Hòa of Central Vietnam. They speak Roglai - a Malayo-Polynesian language. The word raglai means 'forest' in their language. The Raglai's population was 146,613 in 2019.

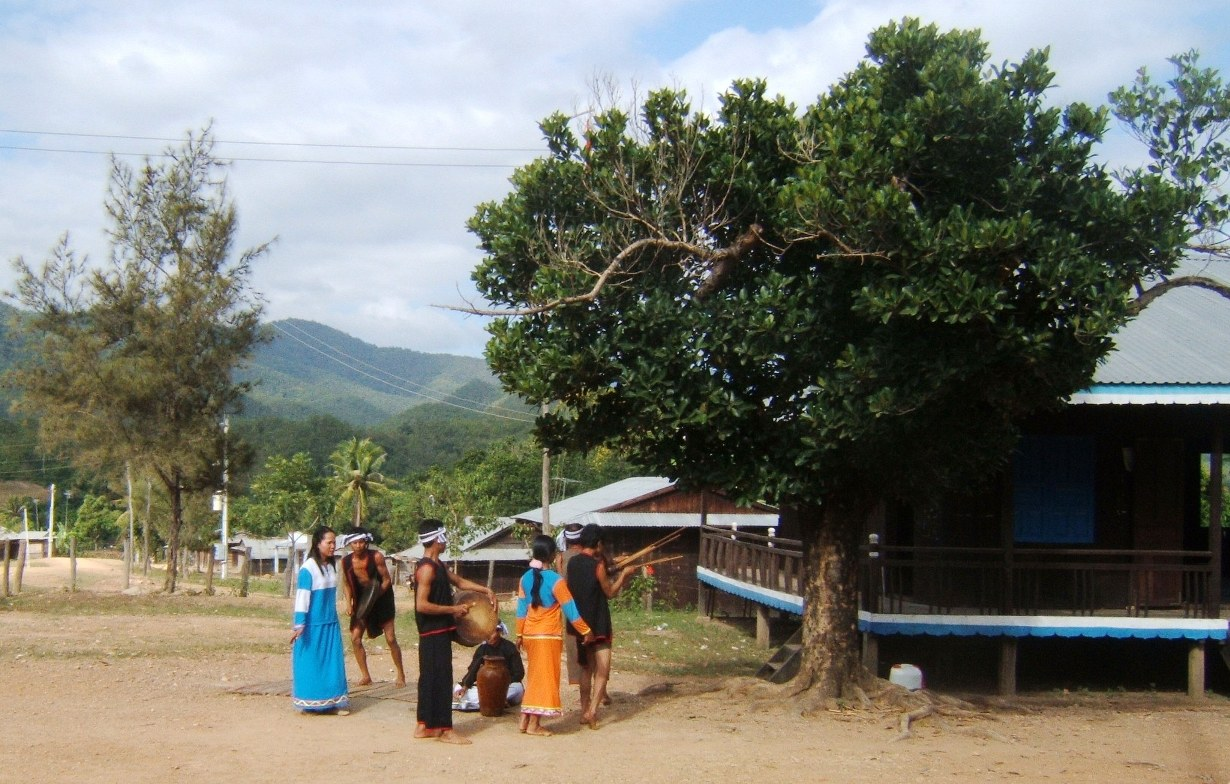
Raglai Dance in Ma Noi commune, Ninh Thuận province, Vietnam

== History ==
Raglai community has many names, among which Rànglai, Ràglai, Ràdlai, Rơglai, Ràng-chơk, Ràng-ngơk. However, these are just negative ways of "mountainous people" but no other meanings. In the Nguyễn dynasty's records, this community was once called as mọi Lá Vàng ("barbarians of yellow-leaf").

The Raglai people have lived in the high and rugged mountains in the west of Khánh Hòa, Ninh Thuận and Bình Thuận provinces, next to the Cham people in the South Central Coast plains for a very long time. The two groups of Cham and Raglai have had a deep relationship during their history. The thousand-year-old remaining proverb "Cam sa-ai Raglai adei" ("Cham oldest sister, Raglai youngest sister") proved their blood relations.

Previously, the Raglai community was only considered a part of the Cham people when considering the language, costumes and some customs. However, while the Cham people basically moved to the beliefs that banned idols and mascots, the Raglai over time returned to the habit of worshiping the "wooden statue" ancestors like the Central Highlands community. Since 1989, there were administrative documents and some efforts of cultural officials to go from review to the recognition of Raglai people entitled to ethnic minority regulations in 1997. Since then, Vietnamese media and entertainment have regularly read the name of this nation as Rắc-lây (in the Kinh language) or Raàk-lei (in the Rhade language).

== Culture ==
Although Raglai people is still a small community, they have made great contributions to modern culture in Vietnam. The Raglai people have a rich musical tradition. The Raglai people use their own specific variants of Đàn đá, Gong, Đàn nhị, Kèn bầu, Đàn bầu instruments those named as PATƠU TILẼNG, CHHAR / CHĨNG, CANHĨ, CHAPI VILUAI respectively.

== Notable people ==
- Pinăng Tắc - Ama Tắc (1910 - 1987), a Việt Cộng guerrilla of Ninh Thuận Province Command, who led the Raglai people during First Indochina War and Second Indochina War, was awarded the Hero of the People's Armed Forces on May 5, 1965.

== See also ==
- Roglai language
- Jarai people
- Champa
- Degar
- Tây Nguyên
- FULRO
