= K'ni =

Musical instrument known as a mouth resonator fiddle

The k'ni, also known as mim or memm in Cambodia, popularly known as a mouth violin is a mouth resonator fiddle, i.e. a fiddle-like instrument used by the Jarai people in Vietnam and Tampuan people in Cambodia.

== Etymology ==
K'ni is the common word for fiddle in the Jarai language.

In Khmer, the mouth violin is referred to as the mim, which derives from the Khmer word meaning baby suckling or breastfeeding. In fact, the musician playing mouth violin makes movement resembles a child receiving breast milk.

While it is sometimes referred to as a mouth violin, it should more properly be called a mouth resonator fiddle not to be confused with the European Jew's harp known in north-east England as the “Gewgaw,” a word possibly derived from the Swedish word “munngiga,” and German Maulgeige meaning “mouth fiddle.”

== History ==
The earliest depictions of the mouth resonator fiddle have been identified on the bas-relief of the Bayon in Cambodia. The instrument was also likened to a 2,000-year old chordophone recovered in Vietnam. Since Angkorian times, the instrument was thought to have vanished from Khmer culture at an uncertain time. However, in 2001 a research team from the Ministry of Culture discovered the instrument being played by Phorn Dav in Ou Chum District, Ratanakiri Province. In 2004, Phorn Dav became a master on the Cambodian Master Performers Program (CMPP), teaching a new generation of players and reviving the instrument in Cambodia.

Today, it is in use among the Jarai people in Vietnam and Tampuong people in Cambodia. Similar instruments are used among other tribal peoples of the Central Highlands, such as the Bahnar people. The instrument does not have a direct equivalent among traditional Vietnamese musical instruments.

The k'ni or mim is among the Angkorian instruments that were thought to have disappeared, but which were recently recovered though anthropological research. Thus, just as the Khmer were surprised to see Austronesian people like the Jarai in Vietnam and the Tampuan in Ratanakiri playing the mim, the Khmer were also able to recover the Angkorian harp through ethnological research and comparison with the traditional harps in Khmer-Mon cultures of Myanmar where the harp was still in use.

== Description ==
The k'ni is a bowed chordophone which uses the musician's palate as a resonator which enables the instrument to imitate certain qualities found in vocal music. In Ratanakiri, the fretboard is composed of four frets which in Tampuan language are referred to as thaᴐ, literally meaning female cleavage whereas the Jarai of Vietnam use six fingerboards - made with large thorns harvested from the trunks of kapok trees, called tơsâu kơni which also means the "breasts of kơni".

Whereas the Jarai k'ni is made of bamboo, the Kreung people in Ratanakiri have them made of bamboo.

The bow is usually hairless made of a simple straw of bamboo and resin is used to ensure its adhesivity.

In the absence of any sound box, the resonance is obtained through a mouthpiece that makes a humming sound modulate by the opening of the mouth. The musician ties a string around the bottom near the bridge and stretches it into their mouth. In order to keep this string tightly in the mouth, a bamboo circle is pierced with a hole and tied to the string, confining it to the bamboo neck of the instrument. This bamboo circle has sometime been replaced by a piece of plastic to make it easier for older toothless musicians. The Jarai people sometimes tie a small bamboo section to a long string to create an amplifier in a traditional way of doing court to young women.

The musician holds the neck of the instrument on one and in their left hand while the other end close to the bridge is held tightly between their first and second toe.
