= Tsat language =

Austronesian language spoken in Hainan, China

Tsat
- Hainan Cham
- Native to: China
- Region: Hainan
- Ethnicity: Utsul
- Native speakers: 4,500 (2007)
- Language family: Austronesian: Malayo-Polynesian; Malayo-Sumbawan (?); Chamic; Highlands; Northern Chamic; Tsat

Language codes
- ISO 639-3: huq
- Glottolog: tsat1238
- ELP: Tsat

Tsat, also known as Utsat, Utset, Hainan Cham, or Huihui (simplified Chinese: 回辉语; traditional Chinese: 回輝語; pinyin: Huíhuīyǔ), is an Austronesian language spoken by 4,500 Utsul people in the Huihui and Huixin villages near the city of Sanya in Hainan, China.

Hainan Cham offers an extreme example of change through language contact. Its phonology, word structure, and grammar have all been extensively influenced by neighbouring Hlai and Sinitic languages, making it a member of the Mainland Southeast Asian linguistic area in contrast to other Austronesian languages.

== Classification ==
Tsat is a member of the Malayo-Polynesian group within the Austronesian language family, and is one of the Chamic languages originating on the coast of present-day Vietnam. It is thus closely related to Acehnese, Cham and Jarai.

The origins of the Utsul are obscure. Though they are undoubtedly Cham, and therefore primarily descended from immigrants from the Champa states of modern-day southern Vietnam, it is unclear when they arrived in Hainan and to what extent other Hui Muslim groups contributed to their ethnogenesis. Thurgood, Thurgood, and Li (2014) record several traditional accounts, which mention Tang-dynasty Xinjiang, Song Guangdong, and post-Vijaya Champa as distinct legendary origins of the Utsul people. These accounts - all of which are considered to have some basis in historical fact - reveal a strong emphasis on Muslim religious identity rather than ethnolinguistic heritage, compounded by the conflation of Muslims in the region as "Hui" regardless of language. A migration from Champa after 968 AD (the fall of Indrapura) appear to be the most significant contributor to the modern Utsul identity, although another migration in the fifteenth century is also recorded in Chinese texts.

Thurgood, Thurgood, and Li's grammar distinguishes between an older form of the language, "Colloquial Cham", and a more recent "Mandarinised" version. Their source for the former is Li and Thompson's 1981 research among speakers since deceased; it is doubtful whether the less Mandarinised variety is still spoken in Sanya.

== Phonology ==
=== Consonants ===
		Labial	Alveolar	Palatal	Velar	Glottal
Plosive	voiceless	p	t		k	ʔ
Plosive	aspirated	pʰ	tʰ		kʰ	
Plosive	implosive	ɓ	ɗ			
Affricate			ts			
Fricative	voiceless		s			h
Fricative	voiced	v	z			
Nasal		m	n	ɲ	ŋ	
Lateral			l			

- Sibilants /ts, s/ may also be pronounced as [tɕ, ɕ] when before /i/. However, the palatalised affricate [tɕ] is generally found in Mandarin borrowings; it is only attested in one native term, tsioŋʔ³³ [tɕioŋʔ˧] "eggplant".
- The implosives /ɓ ɗ/ are primarily of non-native origin (/ɓ/ only occurs in two terms from Proto-Austronesian, and /ɗ/ in none). The main source for implosives is Mon-Khmer loanwords, as well as more recent terms from Southern Min.

=== Vowels ===
	Front	Central	Back
Close	i		u
Mid	e	ə	o
Open		a aː	

- Final glide sounds [j, w] may also occur as a realization of /i/, /u/ at the end of falling diphthongs.

== Sound changes ==
Though descended from Old Cham, which - like most Austronesian languages in Asia - is characterized by absence of phonemic tone and overwhelmingly disyllabic roots, intensive contact with Hlai and Sinitic languages has influenced Hainan Cham to become a primarily monosyllabic, heavily tonal language.

=== Syllabic reduction ===
Most lexical items in Hainan Cham are monosyllabic, but native vocabulary can often be traced to disyllabic roots in Proto-Chamic. There are three processes by which an earlier (Austronesian or Chamic) disyllable has become a monosyllable in Hainan Cham:

Process	Non-HC Austronesian	HC	Meaning
Loss of medial /-h-/	tahun (Malay)	thun³³	year
Diphthongisation of /-r-, -l-/	*bulan (Proto-Chamic)	pʰian²¹	moon
Initial syllable deletion	*basah (Proto-Chamic)	sa⁵⁵	damp

=== Tonogenesis ===
Hainan Cham tones correspond to various Proto-Chamic sounds.

Hainan Cham Tonogenesis
Tone value (Hainan Cham)	Type of tone (Hainan Cham)	Proto-Chamic final sound
55	High	*-h, *-s; PAN *-q
42	Falling	*-p, *-t, *-k, *-c, *-ʔ; Voiceless final: voiced stop / affricate (pre-)initial (Note: if a voiced pre-initial is present, its voicing determines the tone even if the main syllable has a voiceless initial) *-ay, *-an (Note: The finals *-ay and *-an turn into falling 42 regardless of initial voicing)
24	Rising	*-p, *-t, *-k, *-c, *-ʔ; Voiceless final: default
11	Low	Vowels and nasals, *-a:s Voiced final: voiced stop / affricate (pre-)initial
33	Mid	Vowels and nasals, *a:s Voiced final: default

== Grammar ==
Like other languages of the Mainland Southeast Asian area, Tsat grammar is analytic, making use of word order, adpositions, and phonologically independent modifiers instead of bound affixes. In several aspects, Tsat grammar mirrors Mandarin structures exactly; however, these features are not always loaned in full but rather calqued from native Austronesian roots.

=== Nouns ===
Most simple nouns are monosyllabic: pʰe²¹ "sheep", piaʔ²⁴ "silver". Noun-noun or classifier-noun compounding is very common. In contrast to Sinitic languages, native noun-noun compounds in Tsat are of the order (modified [modifier]), e.g. siawʔ²⁴ka:n³³ "fin" ("wing" + "fish"); this is also the case in other Cham languages. Only a few recent loans from Mandarin are of the order ([modifier] modified), e.g. sa:n²¹ŋa:t²⁴ "birthday" ("birth" + "day").
