= Utsuls =

Ethnic group

ملايو ثات
Tsat/ Hainan Champa Utsul

Total population
- At least 8,500

Regions with significant populations
- Sanya, Hainan

Languages
- Tsat, Standard Chinese, Hainanese

Religion
- Predominantly Sunni Islam

Related ethnic groups
- Chams and other Austronesian peoples, Hlai

The Utsuls ([hu˩ t͡saːn˧˨]; traditional Chinese: 回輝人; simplified Chinese: 回辉人; pinyin: Huíhuīrén) are a Chamic-speaking ethnic group which lives on the island of Hainan and are considered one of the People's Republic of China's unrecognized ethnic groups. They are found on the southernmost tip of Hainan, in the two villages of Huihui (回辉) and Huixin (回新) of Tianya, Sanya.

== History ==
The Utsuls are thought to be descendants of Cham refugees who fled their homeland of Champa in what is now modern Central Vietnam to escape the Vietnamese invasion. After the Vietnamese completed the conquest of Cham in 1471, sacking Vijaya, the last capital of the Cham kingdom, a Cham prince and about 1,000 followers moved to Hainan, where the Ming dynasty allowed them to stay. Several Chinese accounts record Cham arriving on Hainan even earlier, from 986, shortly after the Vietnamese captured the earlier Cham capital of Indrapura in 982, while other Cham refugees settled in Guangzhou.

While most of the Chams fled Champa to Cambodia, a small business class fled northwards. How they came to acquire the name Utsul is unknown.

Their population was greatly reduced during the Second Sino-Japanese War by the Japanese. More than 4,000 Utsuls were killed in Sanya by the invading Japanese in the Hainan Island Operation. Hundreds of Utsul Muslim houses and mosques in Sanya were destroyed by the Japanese in order to build an airport.

== Identity ==
Although the Utsuls are culturally, ethnically and linguistically distinct from the mainland Hui, the Chinese government nevertheless classifies them as Hui due to their Islamic faith. From reports by Hans Stübel, the German ethnographer who made contact with them in the 1930s, however, their language is completely unrelated to any other language spoken in mainland China.

== Genetics ==
A genetic study by Li et al. (2013) suggested that the surviving Utsat were genetically much closer to the indigenous Hlai people than to the Cham and other mainland southeast Asian populations. The study suggests that there was high assimilation of the indigenous Hlai in the formation of the Utsat.

== Family names ==
Some common Utsul family names include Chen, Ha, Hai, Jiang, Li, Liu and Pu.

== Famous people ==
- Abdullah Ahmad Badawi, 5th Prime Minister of Malaysia. His maternal grandfather is of Utsul descent.

== See also ==
- Unrecognized ethnic groups in China
