= Jarai people =

Austronesian ethnic group of Vietnam and Cambodia

Jarai
Regions with significant populations
- Vietnam: 513,930 (2019)
- Cambodia: 26,922 (2019)

Languages
- Jarai; Vietnamese and Khmer as second language in Vietnam and Cambodia respectively

Religion
- Animism, Evangelicalism, Buddhism

Related ethnic groups
- Cham • Rade • Acehnese

Jarai people or Dega (Vietnamese: Người Gia Rai, Gia Rai, or Gia-rai; Khmer: ចារ៉ាយ, Charay or Khmer: ជ្រាយ, Chreay) are an Austronesian indigenous people and ethnic group native to Vietnam's Central Highlands (Gia Lai and Kon Tum Provinces, with smaller populations in Đắk Lắk Province), as well as in the Cambodian northeast Province of Ratanakiri. During the Vietnam War, many Jarai persons, as well as members of other Montagnard groups (Khmer Loeu and Degar), collaborated with US Special Forces, and many were resettled with their families in the United States, particularly in North Carolina, after the war.

The Jarai language is a member of the Malayo-Polynesian branch of the Austronesian language family. It is related to the Cham language of central Vietnam and Cambodia and the Malayo-Polynesian languages of Indonesia, Malaysia, Madagascar, Philippines and other Pacific Islands such as Hawaii and New Zealand. There are approximately 332,558 Jarai speakers. They are the largest of the upland ethnic groups of the Central Highlands known as Degar or Montagnards and they make up 23% of the population of Ratanakiri Province in Cambodia. Both groups, the Cambodian and Vietnamese Jarai, share the same traditions and keep a close relation of cultural interchange, but their language gets the influence of their respectively Khmer and Vietnamese linguistic environment. A few of khmer Jarai words are borrowed from Khmer and Lao. While trading conversation between Khmer Jarai and Vietnamese Jarai, there can be some perplexity among them. Vietnamese Jarai has a written form in Latin script, but Khmer Jarai does not.

== Name ==
The word Jarai (ចារ៉ាយ - Charay) means "People of the Waterfalls" or "People of the Flowing River".

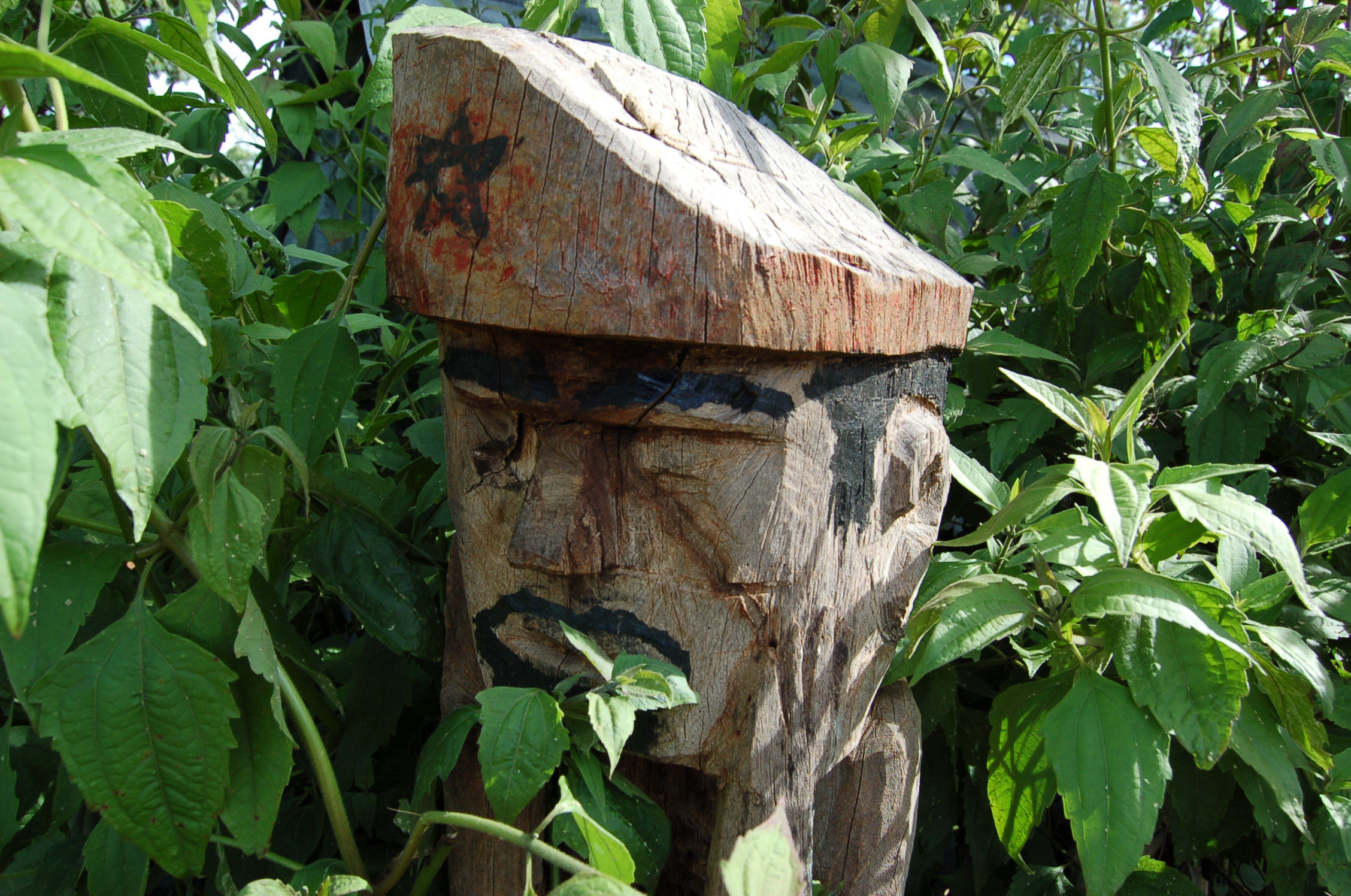
Guardian spirit of a Jarai tomb in Kon Tum Province

== Origins ==
Studies about the Jarai people and their culture have mainly focused on their language and were made by evangelical groups seeking conversions. Linguistically, they are related to the Malayo-Polynesian language family. There are no known ancient records of Jarai people in the area. The first reports come from the French colony during the 19th century that demarcated the border between Vietnam and Cambodia, dividing the Jarai territory and letting a small portion in what is today Ratanakiri Province.

The Jarai People have inhabited the region of what is today the Vietnamese provinces of Gia Lai, Kon Tum and Đắk Lắk and the Cambodian Ratanakiri Province for many centuries. Research is needed on specifics such as dates and geographical movement.

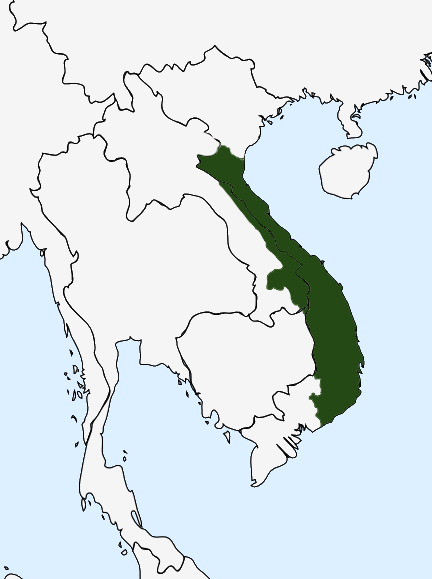
Map of the Kingdom of Champa (1380) during the reign of King Che Bunga. The Jarai people are modern descendants of Champa, along with other groups of the region.

Being part of the Zomia Region that include all highlander indigenous peoples along the range mountains from the Tibet Plateau to all the northern areas of the Indochina Peninsula, it is possible that the Jarai belong to a very ancient migration from the west and central areas of Asia. In a DNA test to some Jarai students in Cambodia in 2017, they presented evidences of belonging to the Haplogroup T-M184 that originates more than 25 thousand years ago at the Mediterranean Basin.

The studies of the Jarai language since the middle of the 19th century, found that Jarai is related to Thiames (Chams) and Rade languages of the ancient kingdom of Champa, putting the ancestors of the Jarai in the Malayo origins and Chamic languages.

The modern Jarai people can be divided in six subgroups, the last one in Cambodia:

1. Jarai Chor.
2. Jarai Hdrung.
3. Jarai Arap.
4. Jarai Mthur
5. Jarai Tbuan.
6. Jarai Khmer also bilingual in Tampuan language.

== History ==
The highland regions of the north of Mainland Southeast Asia were settled by humans somewhere between the later Stone Age (Neolithic) and the Bronze Age, 10,000 years ago. The Jarai people have experienced waves of colonization attempts from earlier Han Chinese invasions, to later French colonization, to current majority Vietnamese continued repression.

=== Sa Huỳnh culture ===
The Sa Huỳnh culture was a culture in modern-day central and southern Vietnam and Philippines that flourished between 1000 BC and 200 AD. Archaeological sites from the culture have been discovered from the Mekong Delta to Quang Binh province in central Vietnam. The Sa Huynh people were most likely the predecessors of the Cham people, an Austronesian-speaking people and the founders of the kingdom of Champa.

=== Champa ===
The term Champa refers to a collection of independent Cham polities that extended across the coast of what is today central and southern Vietnam from approximately the 2nd century through 19th century (1832), before being absorbed and annexed by the Vietnamese state. The destruction of Champa caused the spread of different tribes in the regions of what is today Vietnam, Laos and Cambodia sharing the same linguistic root like the Jarai People.

=== Early Vietnamese and Western contacts ===
Trades between highlanders and lowlanders living around the Gulf of Thailand happened around the 4th century A.C., but there were also raids led by Khmer, Lao and Thai slave traders. The Jarai Kingdom was conquered by Lao rulers during the 18th century, then by Thai during the 19th. The region was incorporated to the French Indochina colony in 1893 and the slave trade was abolished, but indigenous peoples were used for the huge rubber plantations. The French contributed to the delimitation of territories inside their Indochina colonies of Cambodia, Vietnam and Lao. The Ede-Jarai people were mostly divided between Cambodia (a small part of their territory inside Ratanakiri) and Vietnam Central Highlands, although another theory said that Ede-Jarai people moved into the Cambodian territory during the colonial times, but it is probably that they have inhabited the whole territories for centuries.

During the Katip Sumat uprising against Đại Nam, some Jarai joined the rebellion along with the lowlands Cham Muslims and the highlands Churu Muslims.

The first Western report about the Jarai comes from Fr. Bouillevaux, a French missionary that made an incursion through the Mekong in 1850 and mentioned about certain "King of Fire", a man of respect belonging to a certain group of people called Jarai.

The French rulers did not interfere too much with the highland indigenous groups, but considered them an excellent source of personnel for army outposts and recruited large number of Jarai, Khmer Loeu and Degar young men to French forces.

=== Indochina wars ===
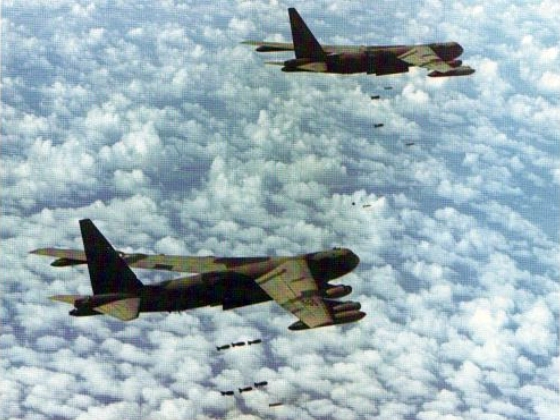
Two U.S. Air Force Boeing B-52D Stratofortress bombers over Cambodia, 1970 in the Operation Menu that affected many indigenous communities like the Ede-Jarai People.

After the Independence, Cambodian and Vietnamese governments led programs to teach indigenous peoples their respective languages and assimilate them into their national societies, but such efforts were met with cultural resistance from most indigenous communities. In Cambodia, the Khmer Rouge guerrillas took advantage of that disaffection and recruited many Khmer Loeu in their ranks, while in Vietnam, the US army retook the French tradition to recruit them into military activities in which many Jarai youth participated. It made the Jarai-Ede and many other indigenous groups target of other enemies. In 1977 a number of 100 Jarai men were tortured and executed by Khmer Rouge cadres in Ratanakiri in a case filed at the Khmer Rouge Tribunal.

During the Vietnam War, Jarai villages suffered the struggle between US military and communist guerrillas. By 31 October 1970, US military ordered a massive resettlement of highlander villages saying that they were "insecure". At the same time, US Evangelists entered in contact with Jarai people and published Bibles in their language (excluding the Khmer Jarai-Ede). The Jarai-Ede Bibles created some literacy to them, but after the Vietnamese reunification in 1975, most of the Jarai assistants of the US military, were evacuated from their land to United States. The Khmer Jarai suffered the intense US bombing of their territory in what was called Operation Menu (1969-1970) with the intention to destroy communist sanctuaries, but displacing hundreds of civilians and indigenous peoples that eventually joined the Khmer Rouge.

The Khmer Rouge kept attempting to incorporate Khmer Loeu peoples in their fights against the Vietnamese and Cambodian central government after its defeat in 1979, but in 1984 there was a campaign to integrate indigenous peoples into the nation, promoting literacy and creating government structures similar to the rest of the country. In Vietnam, the Jarai people has suffered under restrictions of religious parties, making that some of them preferred to emigrate.

In the 1950s and 1960s the Montagnard Degar movement gained popularity among the Jarai and their Montagnard brethren (Degar is a Rhade word meaning "sons of the mountain"). The goal of the Montagnard Degar was to create an independent state in the Vietnamese highlands, consisting entirely of indigenous people groups. As a result of the movement, the Vietnamese government has become increasingly suspicious of the Jarai. Human rights abuses on the part of the government have become frequent among all Montagnards.

=== Modern times ===
In modern times, Jarai people suffered from colonization, land eviction and land grabbing, especially in Cambodia under a big system of corruption and the deforestation to create huge rubber plantations. Although Cambodia has laws to respect and protect the indigenous territories, the law is not applied and powerful individuals and groups profit evict the Jarai communities from their ancestral lands. In Vietnam, some Jarai persons seek for refuge in other countries, crossing the Cambodian territory to escape restrictions of their traditions and cultures.

=== Legends ===
Dega Jarai people has several legends, all settled on the jungles, that are useful to understand their own culture and history. A recurrent element has to see with the stories about three kings: Fire, Water and Wind and a Sacred Sword that came down from heaven to give to the Dega Jarai people great powers. The King of Fire, the first one, lives in Vietnam relying his power in religious rites. Dega Jarai means "waterfall" and thus water makes a part of their relates. Some elders say that Jarai people were born at the Annamite Range and migrated to the south dividing in different groups.

== Culture ==
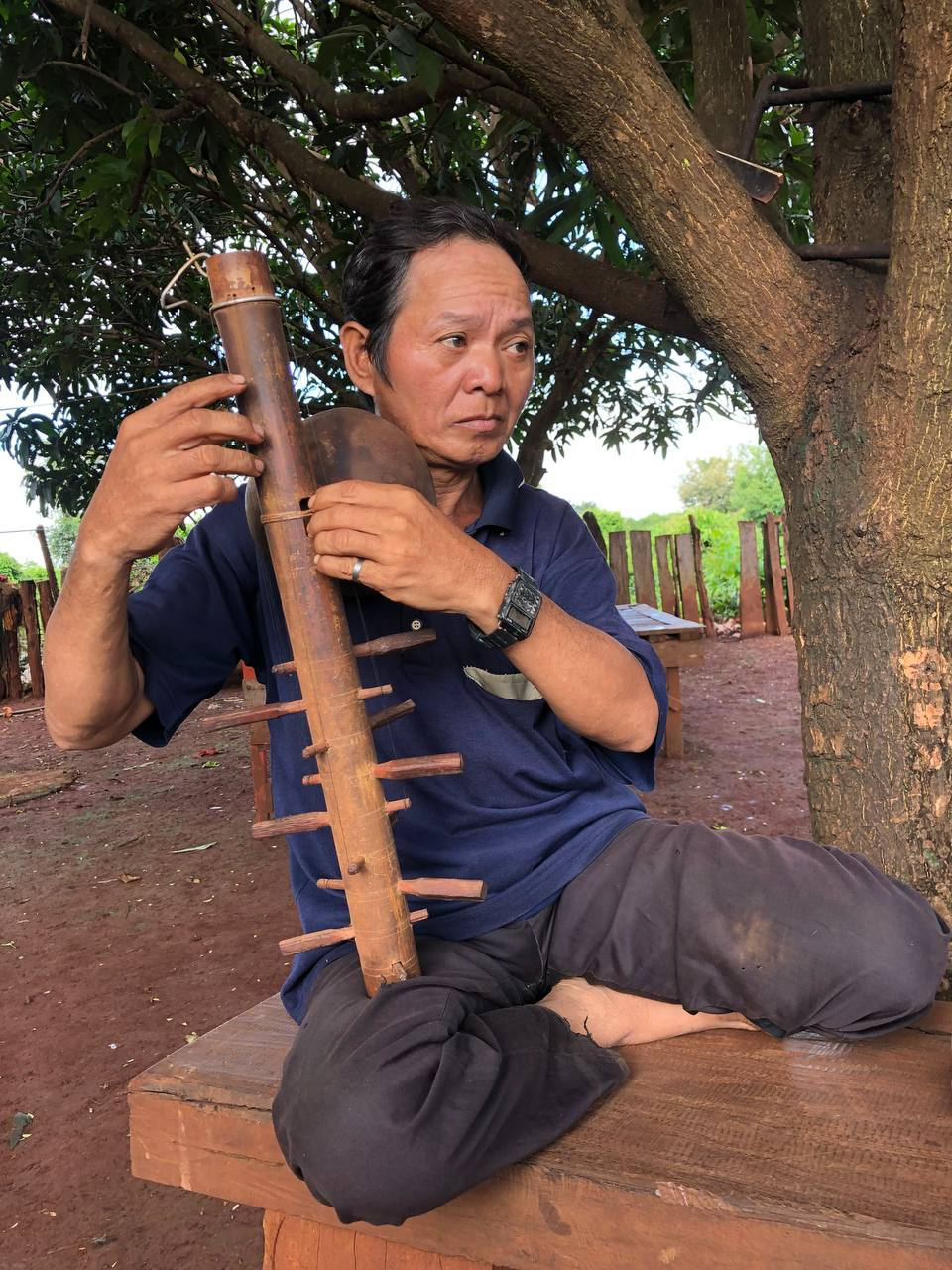
Jarai man playing traditional string instrument

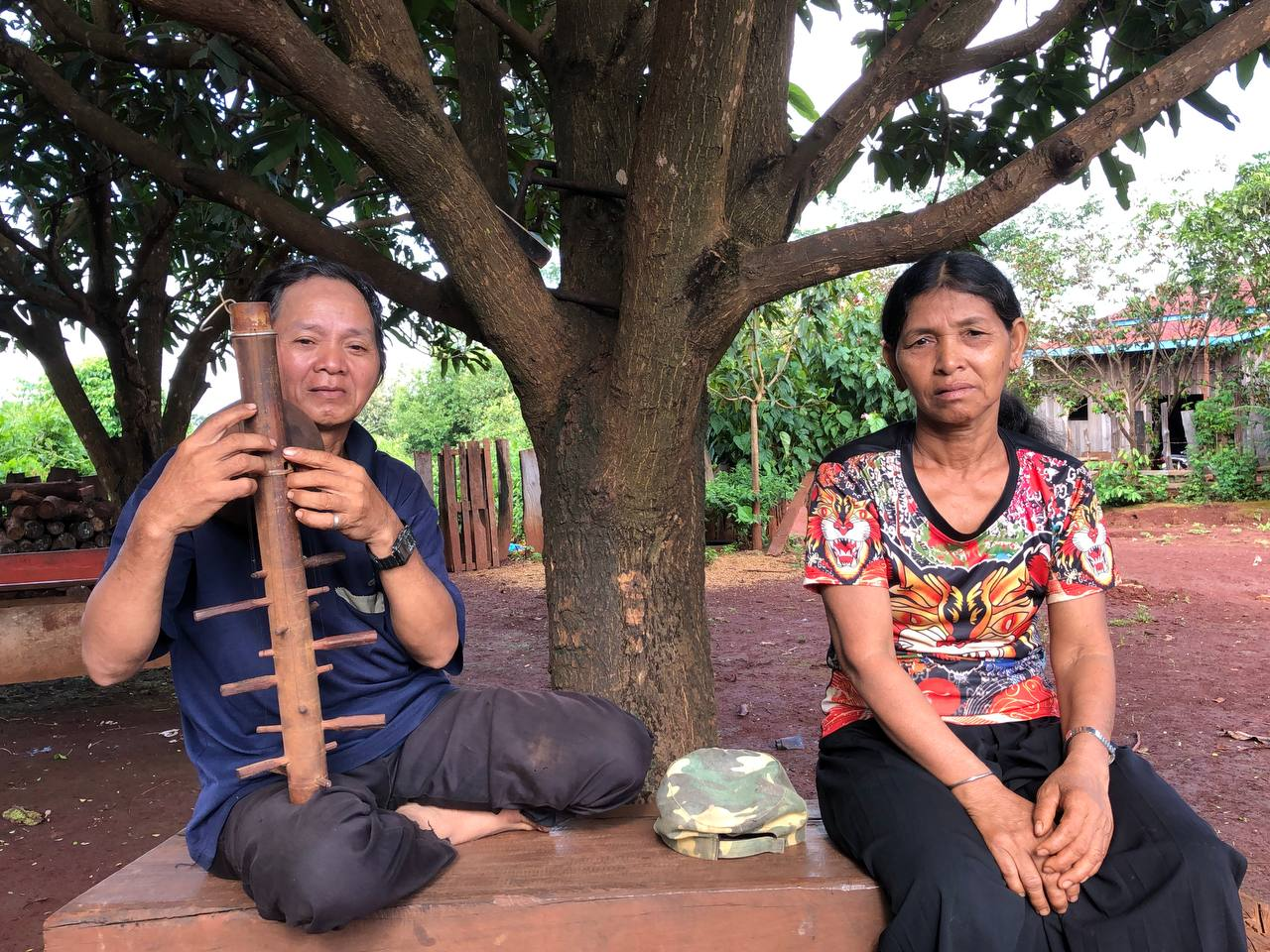
Jarai man playing the traditional string instrument

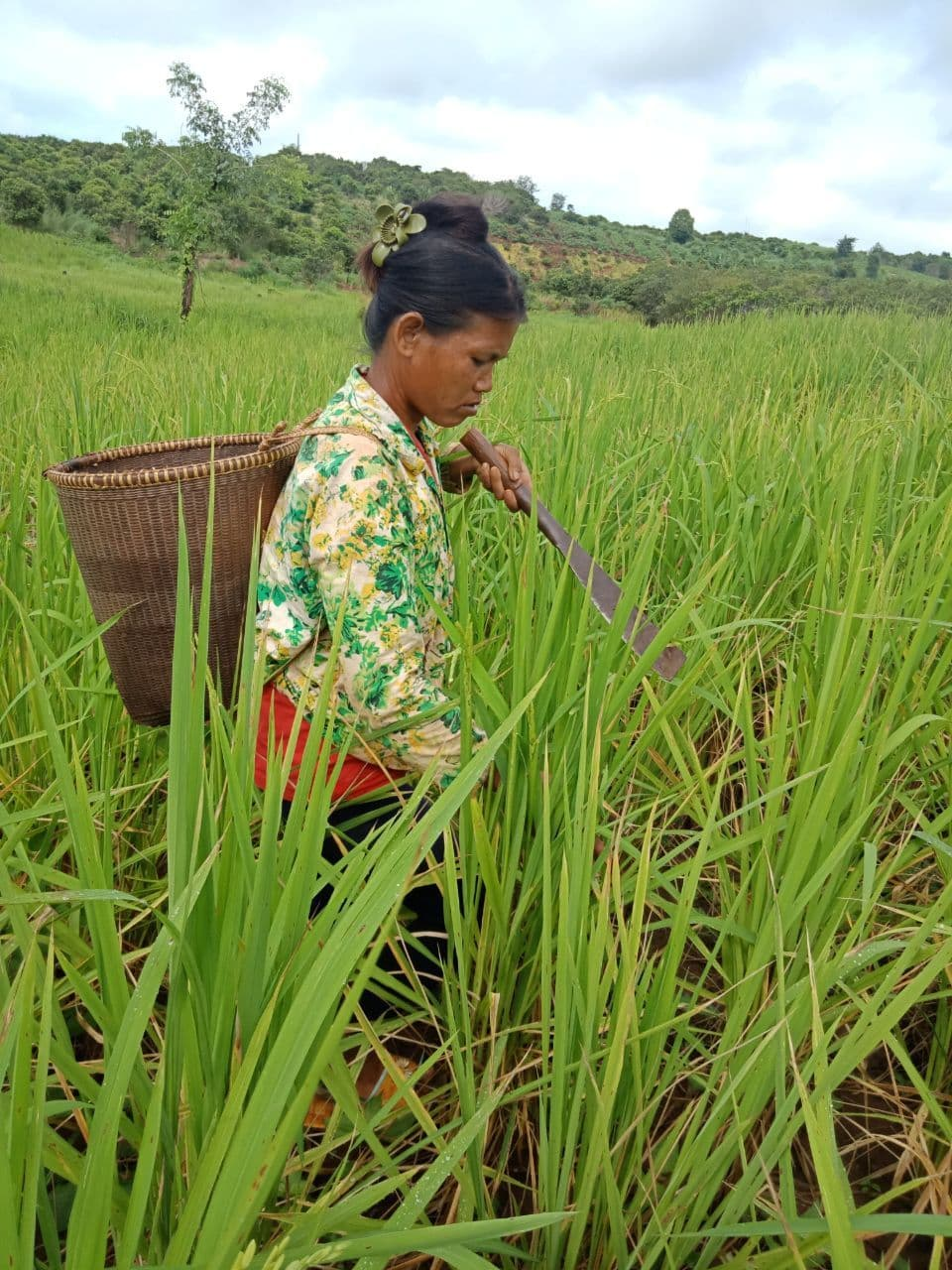
A farm

Jarai traditional string instrument

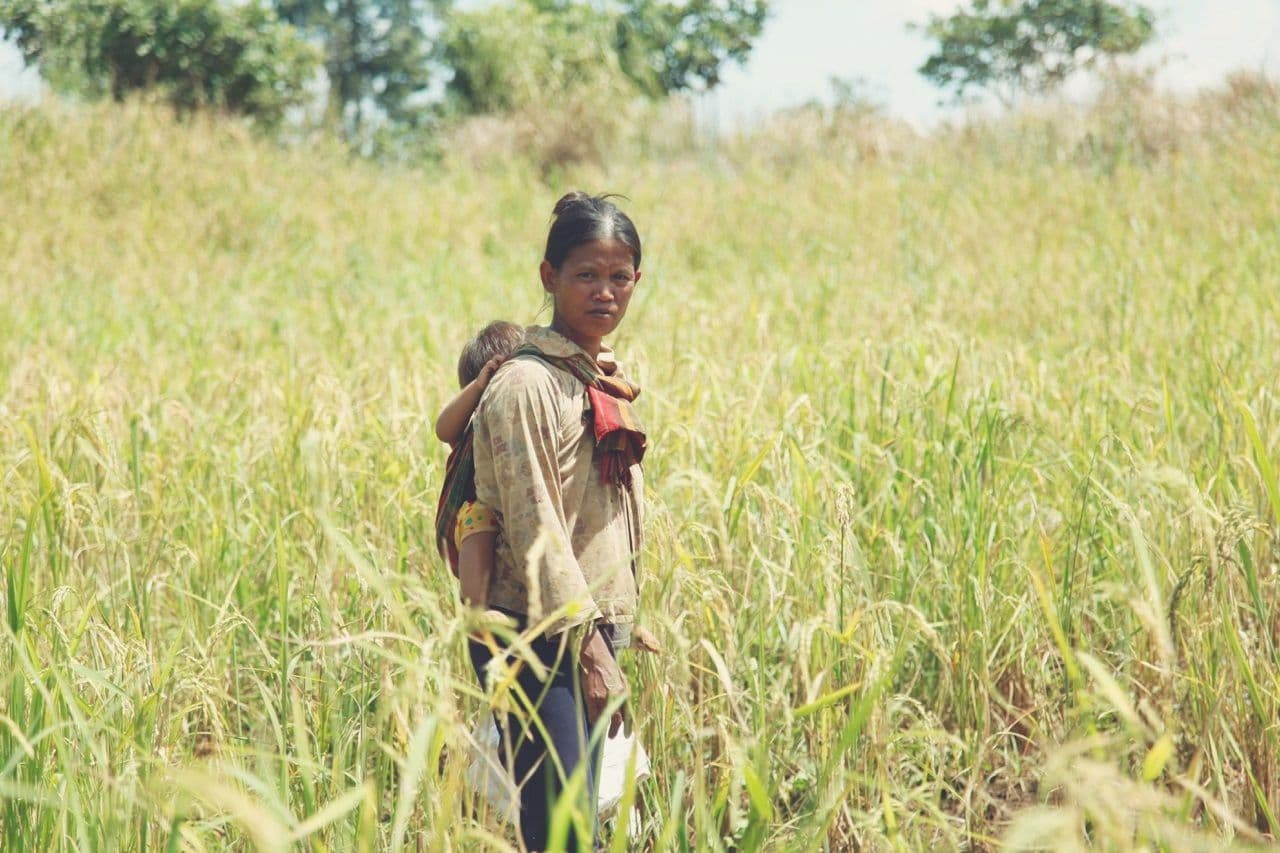
A woman looks at a farm

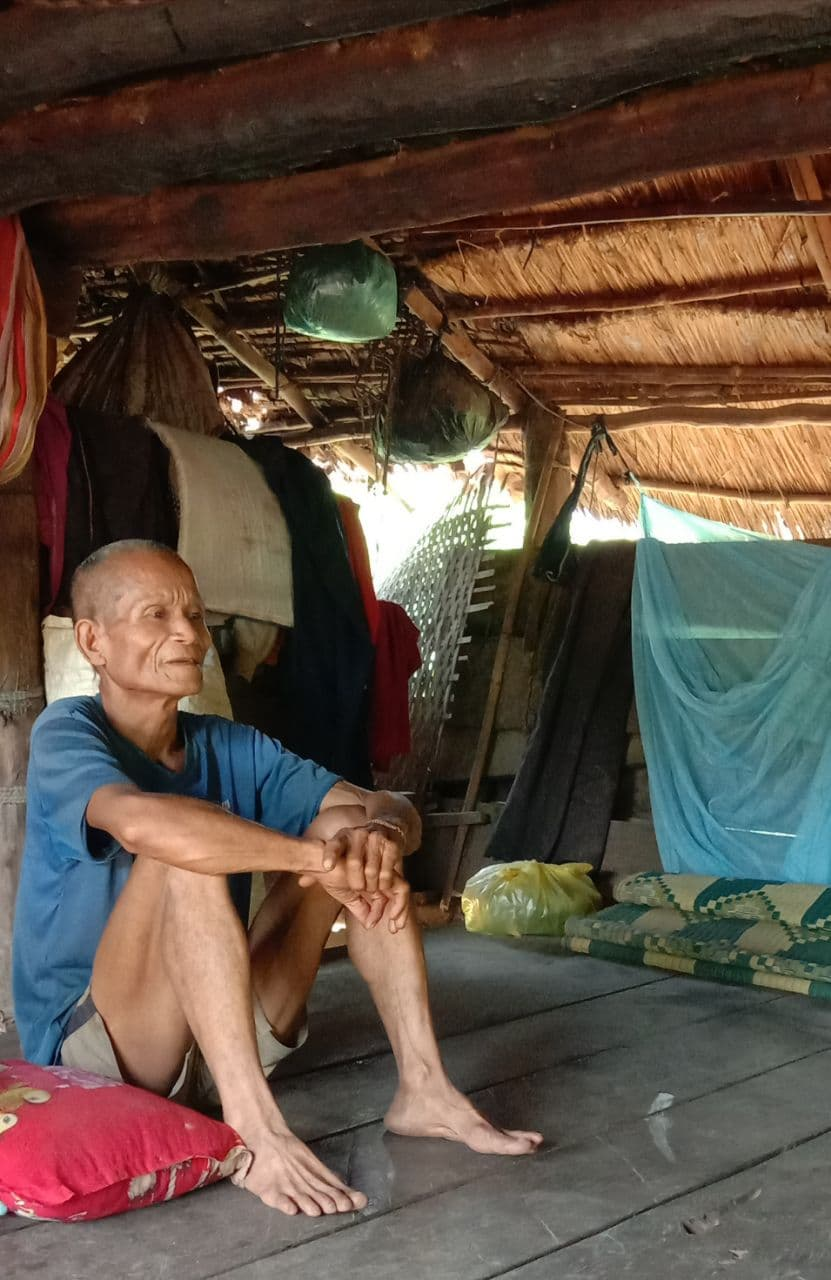
Recounting the war experience

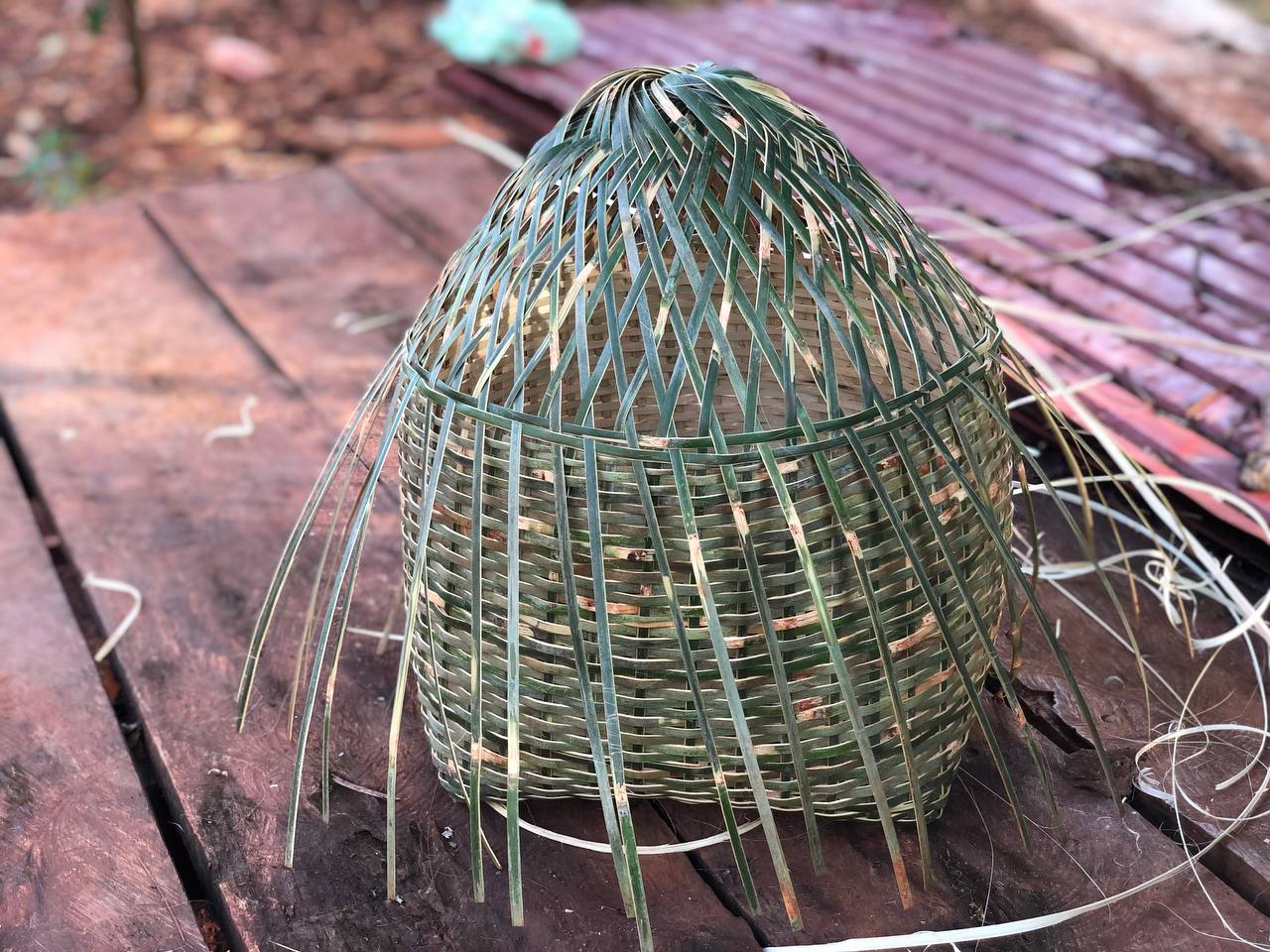
Traditional Jarai basket made from bamboo

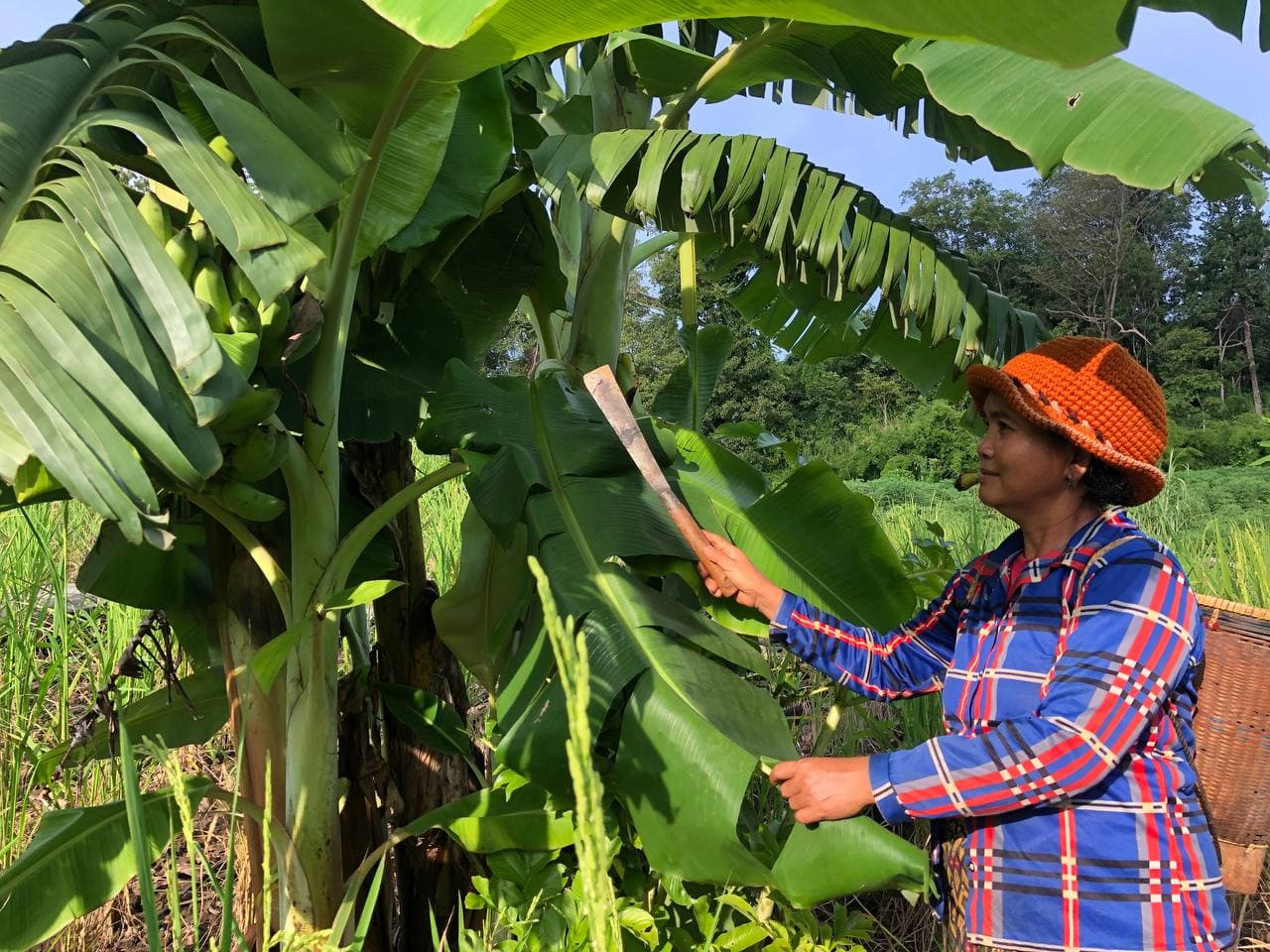
A Jarai woman cutting a banana tree

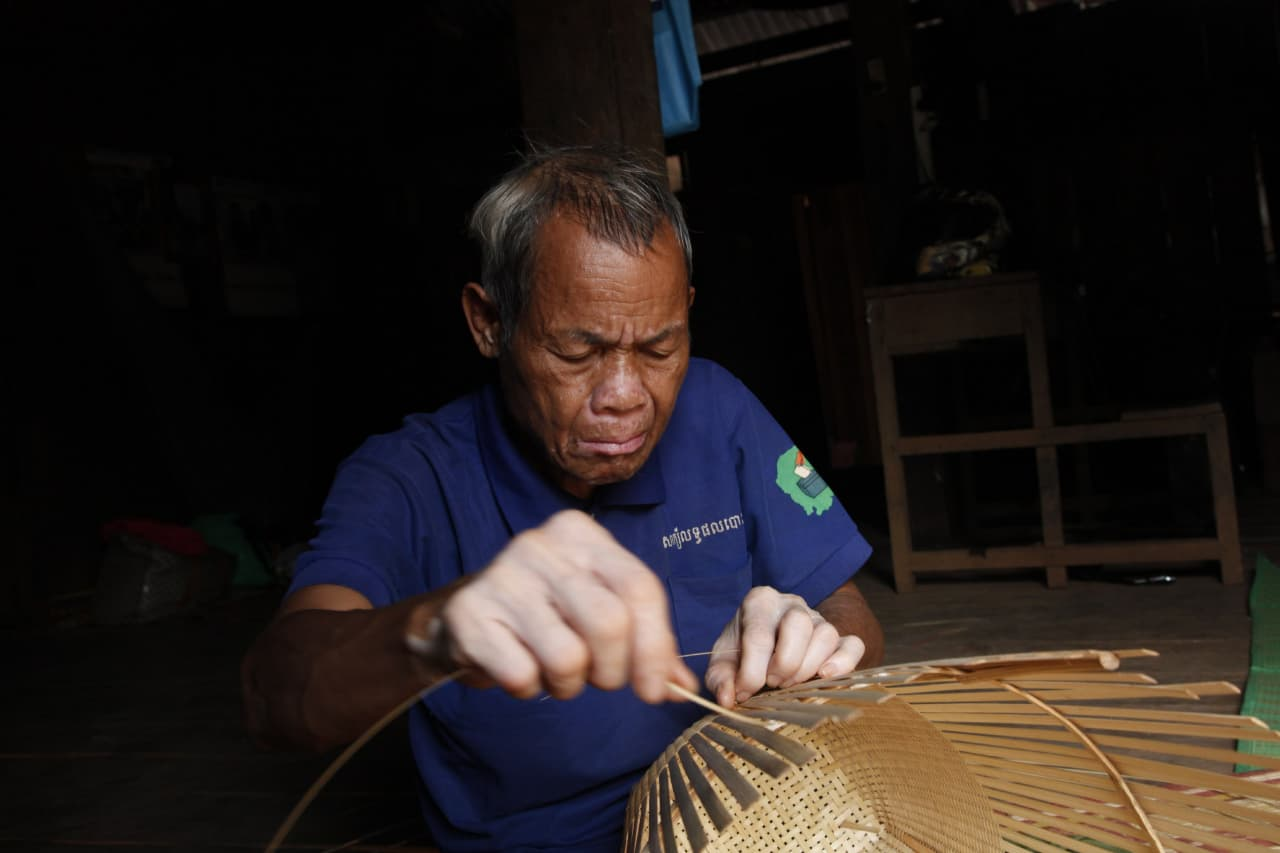
Jarai man

=== Villages ===
Traditionally, the Ede-Jarai live in small villages numbering 50-500 in population. The villages are laid out in a square, with single occupancy dwellings or communal longhouses (roong) arranged around a village center. Often the village centre has a communal house, well, volleyball net and rice mill.

Houses are made of bamboo, one metre above the ground. More durable wooden houses with steel roofs have gained popularity. They are oriented from north to south and built in a place acceptable to the local spirits. Houses are set up according to matrilineal clan. A daughter, when married, lives in the house of her mother with her husband and thus her own daughter. A house can be as long as 50 metres. Homes for just the nuclear family are also common in modern times.

Small generators are used widely in Dega-Jarai Ratanakiri villages where there is no electricity. Traditional furnishings include benches and kitchen objects crafted from wood and bamboo and modern additions are now found, including beds and TVs.

=== Wedding ===
Jarai is a matrilineal culture tracing the descent through the female line and identifying each person with their matriline lineage, which can involve the inheritance of property and/or titles. The mother is the one to take the initiative of the marriage of her daughters and the husband is expected to come to live in the house of his mother-in-law. The intermarriage with persons of other ethnic groups can be common, especially if there is a proximity of villages. In Ratanakiri Province, Jarai people intermarriage especially with the Tampuan people, an unrelated group of Mon-Khmer language family. With the access of many Jarai young people to education in bigger towns or cities like Phnom Penh or Ho Chi Minh City, intermarriage with other ethnic groups is increasing, creating multilingual families.

=== Religion ===
The traditional religion of the Jarai is animism. They believe that objects, places and creatures possess distinctive spiritual qualities. Jarai Animism has two main elements: the idea that the Jarai people received the Sacred Sword from Heaven that means wisdom and the spiritual figure of the King of Fire, King of Water and King of Wind. The kings do not represent political figures, but they are rather spiritual leaders with shamanic powers. The Jarai kings attract even persons from other ethnic groups that believe in their influences over the mysteries of the human nature and the souls of all living things. Jarai animism is strictly linked to the jungle and it includes animal sacrifices to appease the spirits.

As typical with most animist beliefs, surrounding religions threaten the propriety and continuity of those of the Jarai. A negative outside view of their traditional practices has resulted in many efforts to Christianize or secularize them.

The Vietnamese Reunification in 1975 under the Communist regime of Hanoi meant religious restrictions for many people in the country, affecting the ancestral religious traditions of the Vietnamese Jarai. Vietnam allows only six official religions to be practiced in the country and Jarai Animism is one of those excluded. This has motivated some Jarai to seek for refuge in foreign countries.

At the same time, the incursion of US Evangelists during Vietnam War, like the American missionaries under the Christian and Missionary Alliance, interacted closely with Jarai communities and converted many to Christianity amidst danger from the impending regime. Resultatively, the Bible translated into Jarai was published.

In Cambodia, Jarai people live together with the Khmer population, a majority of whom embrace Theravada Buddhism. In contrast to terse political and religious pressure in Vietnam, Buddhism and Jarai animism have a rather peaceful and harmonious relationship with each other. Some Jarai people in Ratanakiri include Buddhist symbols in their rites and houses and participate in Buddhist ceremonies with their Khmer neighbors, although Buddhism Cetiya is generally not practiced in Jarai villages.

Islam began to be recorded as having been spread to the Jarai people in the highlands during the Katip Sumat uprising in 1833 to early 1834. Upon Katip Sumat's (a Cham leader) return from Kelantan, he spread Islam to the Churu and Jarai peoples and recruited them to participate in the Jihad movement against Đại Việt.

=== Music and dance ===
Music and dance are very distinctive elements of the Jarai culture. The Jarai nights in the villages or inside the house clan are animated by their ancestral music performs with gongs, xylophones such as t'rưng, zithers, mouth fiddle k'ni, and various other traditional instruments, many of them made of wood and bamboo. The Jarai Trova is a composition improvised by the musician in which he tells the challenges of the daily life of the Jarai people while the clan drinks the Srah Phien (jar liqueur) made of fermented rice. It is the moment where children learn ancient stories of the jungles and the ancestral values of the Jarai culture. The music and dance are monotonous and nostalgic, creating a close relation with the jungle, the natural environment of the people.

In 1996 Dock Rmah, a prominent Jarai musician living in the United States, received a Folk Heritage Award from the North Carolina Arts Council.

=== Funeral traditions ===
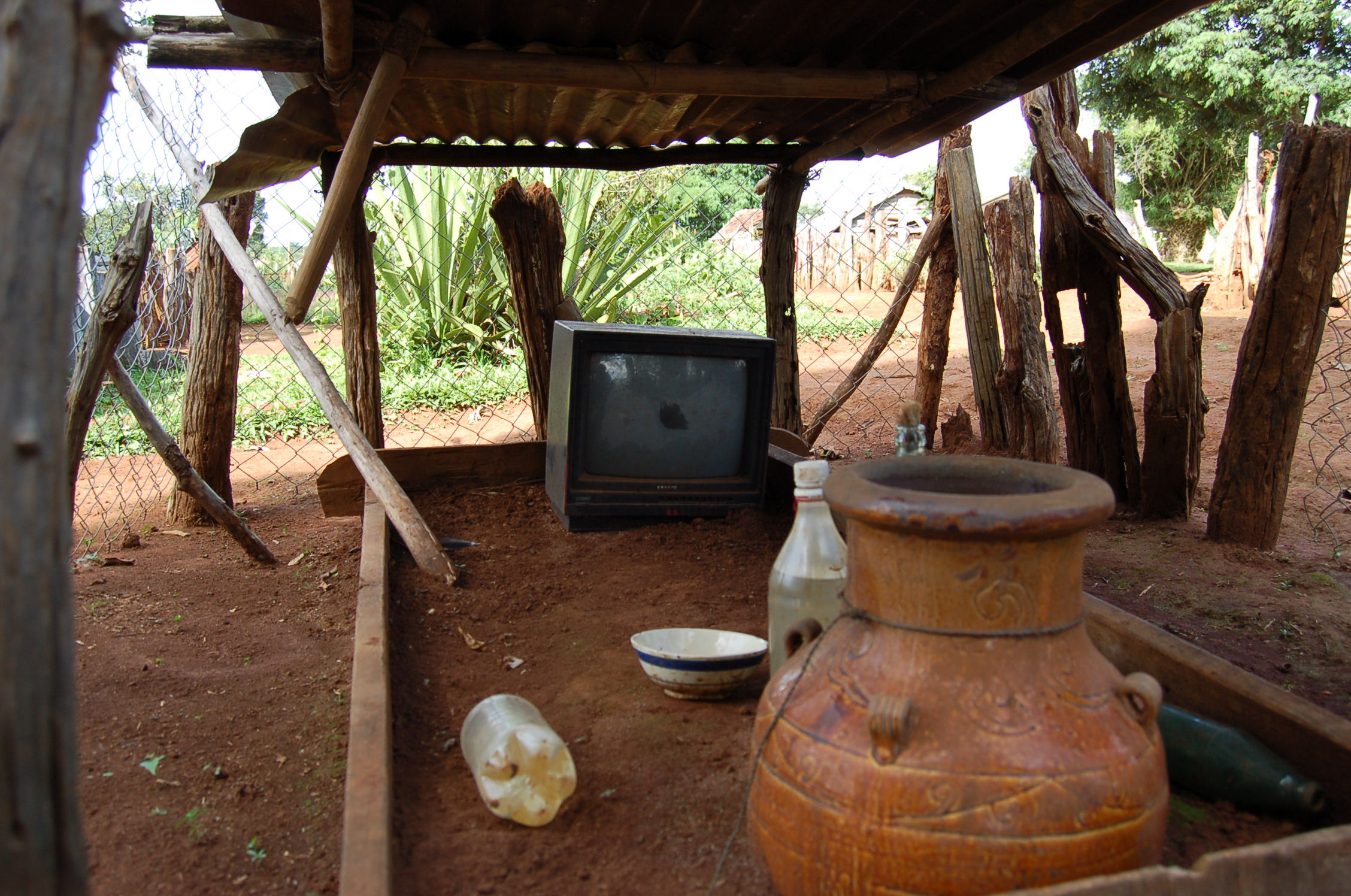
TV and offerings made to the spirit of the deceased in a small Jarai tomb in Kon Tum Province

Traditional Jarai tombs are little huts in which are placed the possessions of the deceased and some offerings. Around the tomb are placed wooden pillars which are topped by crude carvings, some of which represent spiritual guardians.

The burial ceremony is extremely expensive and usually entails the sacrifice of water buffaloes and cows. In Ratanakiri, Jarai people are replacing the sacrifice of large animals with large objects, such as motorcycles. Some deceased persons are buried with their motorbike. If the family of the deceased cannot afford the ceremony, it can be postponed for several years.

After a number of years, the tombs are abandoned. This final ceremony of the abandonment of the tomb marks the point where death becomes final and the deceased spirit is released, thus releasing a widow for remarriage for instance.

== Language and writing system ==
The Jarai language has been classified since 1864 as a Western Malayo-Polynesian Malayic, Achinese-Chamic, Chamic, South, Plateau identified by M. Fontaine as related to the languages of the Thiames (Chams) and Rade of the ancient kingdom of Champa, today the province of Annam.

The division of the Jarai people between two countries (Cambodia and Vietnam), creates a progressive development of two distinctive Jarai linguistic groups: Cambodian Jarai and Vietnamese Jarai, the latter uses the Latin Vietnamese script, while Cambodian Jarai remains without a writing system.

== See also ==
- Jarai language
- Degar
- Thủy Xá and Hỏa Xá
- Khmer Leu
- List of ethnic groups in Vietnam
- Demographics of Vietnam
- Kok Ksor
