= Chru language =

Austronesian language spoken in Vietnam

Chru
- Native to: Vietnam
- Ethnicity: Churu people
- Native speakers: 19,000 (2009 census)
- Language family: Austronesian: Malayo-Polynesian; Malayo-Sumbawan (?); Chamic; Highland; Chru–Northern; Chru

Language codes
- ISO 639-3: cje
- Glottolog: chru1239
- ELP: Chru

Chru (Vietnamese: Cru, Kru, Chrau Hma, also known as Chu, Chu Ru, Churu, Cho Ru, Choru) is a Chamic language of Vietnam spoken by the Churu people in southern Lâm Đồng Province (especially in Đơn Dương District) and in Ninh Thuận Province.

Like the other Chamic languages spoken in Vietnam (Cham, Jarai, Rade and Roglai), use of Chru is declining as native speakers are generally bilingual in Vietnamese, which is used for most official or public settings, like schools.

== Phonology ==
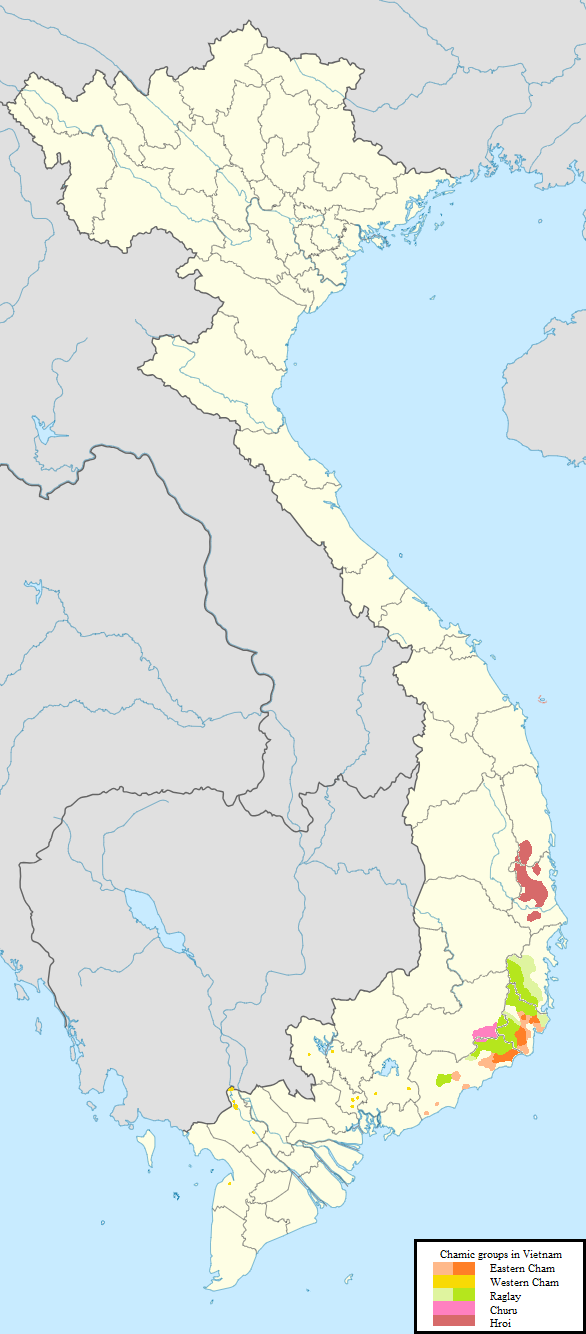
Current distribution of Chams, Roglai and Chru speakers in Vietnam.

=== Consonant inventory ===
The following table lists the consonants of Chru.

		Labial	Apical	Alveolo- palatal	Velar	Glottal
Nasal		m	n	ɲ	ŋ	
Plosive	voiceless	p	t	tɕ	k	ʔ
Plosive	voiced	b	d	dʑ	ɡ	ʔ
Fricative				ɕ		h
Approximant		w		j		

There exist post-aspirated consonants [ph], [th], [kh], but these behave as sequences of stop plus [h]. For example, from the word phaː ('to plane') the nominal pənhaː ('a plane') can be derived by infixation of -n-.

=== Vowel inventory ===
The vowel inventory is given in the following table. All vowels but [eː, o, oː] exist in nasalized form.

	Front	Central	Back
High	i, iː		u, uː
Upper Mid	eː^{[a]}	ə, əː	o, oː
Lower Mid	ɛ, ɛː		ɔ, ɔː
Low	a, aː		

^{a} The vowel [eː] is always followed by [ŋ].

=== Phonotactics ===
Words consist of up to two pre-syllables, and a main syllable. A full example is pətərbləʔ ('to turn over'). The vowels in the pre-syllables are always [ə] after a consonant and [a] otherwise.

== Grammar ==
=== Syntax ===
Like many other languages of Southeast Asia, including Vietnamese, Chru is an analytic (or isolating) language without morphological marking of case, gender, number, or tense. In its typological profile it reflects extensive language contact effects, as it more closely resembles a Mon-Khmer language with monosyllabic roots and impoverished morphology rather than a canonical Austronesian language with bisyllabic roots and derivational morphology (Grant 2005). It has subject-verb-object (SVO) word order.

=== Negation ===
Chru uses a pre-verbal negative particle, 'buh /ʔbuh/ as a simple negative in declarative sentences:

kơu 'buh mưnhũm alak
1SG NEG drink wine
'I don't drink wine.' (Chru LL 3)

An optional clause-final negative particle, ou, may also be used, particularly in negative questions and negative responses to questions:

Du phơn ni nhũ làn lam ia 'bư âu?
But thing this will melt in water NEG
'But this thing will melt in water, right?' (Chru 1st grade primer 59)

Lăm klơu Aràng hu Aràng sêi prong rơlau rêi?
In the godhead is there one person bigger than another?

'Bư âu: Klơu pồ Aràng ring gơu.
No: The godhead is equal to each other. (Chru mass 40)

== See also ==
- Chrau language
