= Jens Christian Svabo =

Faroese linguist, scholar and ethnographer (1746–1824)

Jens Christian Svabo (1746 – 1824) was a pioneering Faroese linguist, scholar, and ethnographer. At the time the islands were part of Denmark-Norway. Svabo was born in Miðvágur, Vágar, the Faroe Islands to a minister and his wife. Svabo studied history, music, and theology in Miðvágur and later in Tórshavn. Between 1765 and 1800 he lived in Denmark and studied music there, especially the violin. In 1800, he returned to Tórshavn and lived in a house known as the Pætursarstova: it was in the attic of this home that in 1928 a book of songs written by Svabo was found. This manuscript is now part of the collection of the Føroya Landsbókasavn (Faroese National Library).

Svabo's work as a songwriter is of merit and indeed, his songs are still played and recorded by groups interested in traditional Faroese and Celtic music. However, it is Svabo's work on the Faroese language and its tradition of oral folktales that has brought him the greatest attention. Svabo's travels around Vágar and later the areas around Tórshavn were at their time unmatched and his efforts to write down oral legends and tales were the first real impetus to the serious study of Faroese oral history. He also wrote a dictionary (republished in the 1960s as: Dictionarium færoense. København: Munksgaard) and worked to standardize the Faroese written language in terms of spelling and grammar to match the traditional spoken language (see Svabo's Om den færøske marsviin-fangst). His efforts to examine distinct dialects of Faroese (especially that of his native Vágar) were the first efforts in this area of regional linguistics of Faroese, also.

The Føroya Landsbókasavn has a number of items and exhibits related to Svabo's diverse career.

== Works ==
- Christian Matras (ed.): Svabos færøske visehaandskrifter. Gyldendal, Copenhagen 1939, 535 pp. (Samfund til Udgivelse af Gammel Nordisk Litteratur; LIX) - "Svabo's Notes of the Faroese Culture"
  - Ders.: Svabos glossar til færøske visehaandskrifter. Copenhagen 1943. 85 pp. (Samfund til Udgivelse af Gammel Nordisk Litteratur; 60) - „Svabos Glossar zu den färöischen Volksweisen“
- Ders.: Dictionarium Færoense - færøsk-dansk-latinsk ordbog. Munksgaard, Copenhagen 1966–70, 2 vols. (Færoensia, Textus & investigationes, 7–8) - "Faroese Dictionary - Faroese-Danish-Latin Dictionary"
- Indberetninger fra en Reise i Færøe 1781 og 1782. C.A. Reitzels Boghandel, Copenhagen 1976, 497 pp. (unaltered reprint) - "Travel report from the Faroes 1781-1782"
