= Roglai language =

Austronesian language spoken in Vietnam

Roglai
- Sanãp Radlai, Sanaut Radlai
- Region: Vietnam
- Ethnicity: Raglai
- Native speakers: (97,000 cited 1999–2002)
- Language family: Austronesian: Malayo-Polynesian; Malayo-Sumbawan (?); Chamic; Highlands; Northern Chamic; Roglai
- Writing system: Latin (modified Vietnamese alphabet)

Language codes
- ISO 639-3: Variously: roc – Cacgia rog – Northern rgs – Southern
- Glottolog: cacg1235 Cacgia Roglai nort2994 Northern Roglai sout3010 Southern Roglai

The Roglai language is a Chamic language of southern Vietnam, spoken by the Raglai people.

There are four Roglai dialects: Northern, Du Long, Southern, and Cac Gia.

Their autonym is radlai, which means 'forest people'.

== Phonology ==
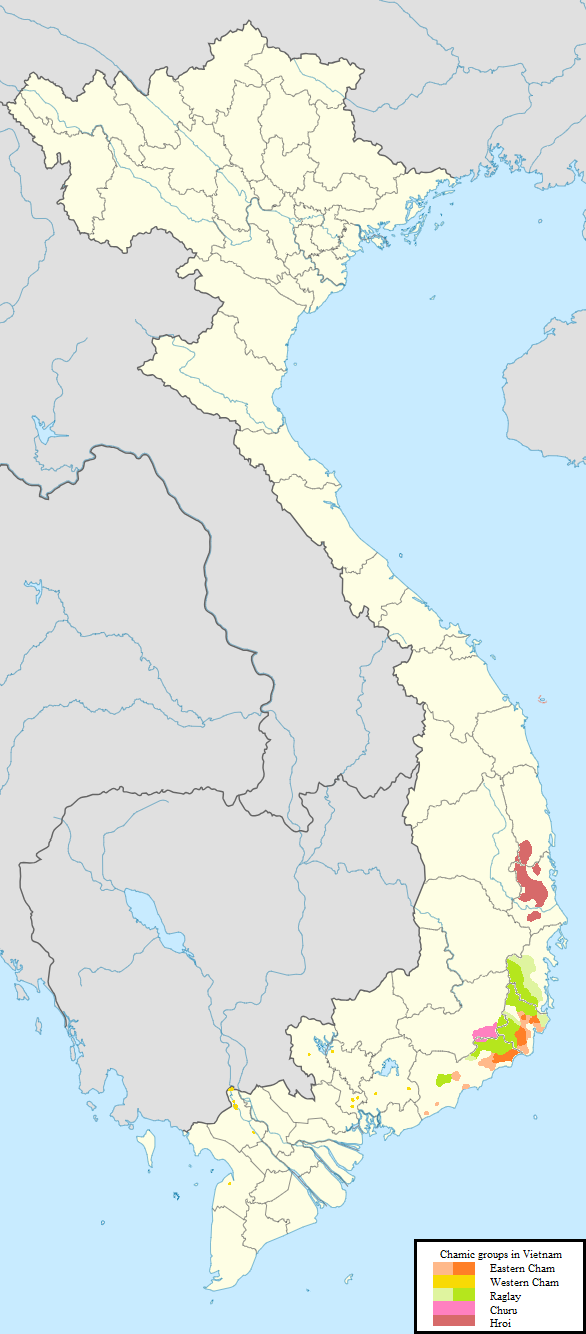
Current distribution of Chams, Roglai and Chru speakers in Vietnam.

=== Consonants ===
		Labial	Alveolar	Palatal	Velar	Glottal
Nasal		m	n	ɲ	ŋ	
Plosive	voiceless	p	t	c	k	ʔ
Plosive	voiced	b	d	ɟ	ɡ	
Plosive	aspirated	pʰ	tʰ	cʰ	kʰ	
Plosive	breathy	bʱ	dʱ	ɟʱ	ɡʱ	
Plosive	implosive	ɓ	ɗ	ʄ		
Fricative			s			h
Rhotic			r			
Approximant		(w)	l	(j)		

=== Vowels ===
	Front	Central	Back
Close	i ĩ	ɨ ɨ̃	u ũ
Mid	e ẽ	ə ə̃	o õ
Open		a ã	

- Sounds /e, o/ may also have more open variants as [ɛ, ɔ].
- Glide sounds [j, w] may also occur as a result of vowel off-glides.

== Vocabulary ==
Mainland Chamic, Aceh and Malay comparative table:

Lexeme	Proto-Chamic	Western Cham	Eastern Cham	Roglai	Aceh	Malay
one	*sa	/sa ha/	/tha/	/sa/	sa	satu
seven	*tujuh	/taçuh/	/taçŭh/	/tijuh/	tujôh	tujuh
fire	*ʔapuy	/pui/	/apuy/	/apui/	apui	api
sky	*laŋit	/laŋiʔ/	/laŋiʔ/ Lingik	/laŋĩ꞉ʔ/	langèt	langit
rice (husked)	*bra꞉s	/prah/	/prah-l/	/bra/	breueh	beras
iron	*bisεy	/pasay/	/pithăy/	/pisǝy/	beusoe	besi
sugarcane	*tabɔw-v	/tapau/	/tapăw/	/tubəu/	teubèe	tebu
