= Chamic languages =

Subgroup of the Austronesian language family

Chamic
- Aceh–Chamic
- Geographic distribution: Indonesia (Aceh), Cambodia, Vietnam, Thailand, China (Hainan Island), various countries with recent immigrants
- Linguistic classification: Austronesian: Malayo-Polynesian; disputed: Malayo-Sumbawan or Greater North Borneo; Malayo-Chamic; Chamic
- Proto-language: Proto-Chamic
- Subdivisions: Acehnese; Coastal Chamic; Highlands Chamic

Language codes
- ISO 639-2 / 5: cmc
- Glottolog: cham1327 Aceh–Chamic cham1330 Chamic
- The languages in Cambodia, Vietnam, Hainan, and the northern tip of Sumatra are Chamic languages (purple).

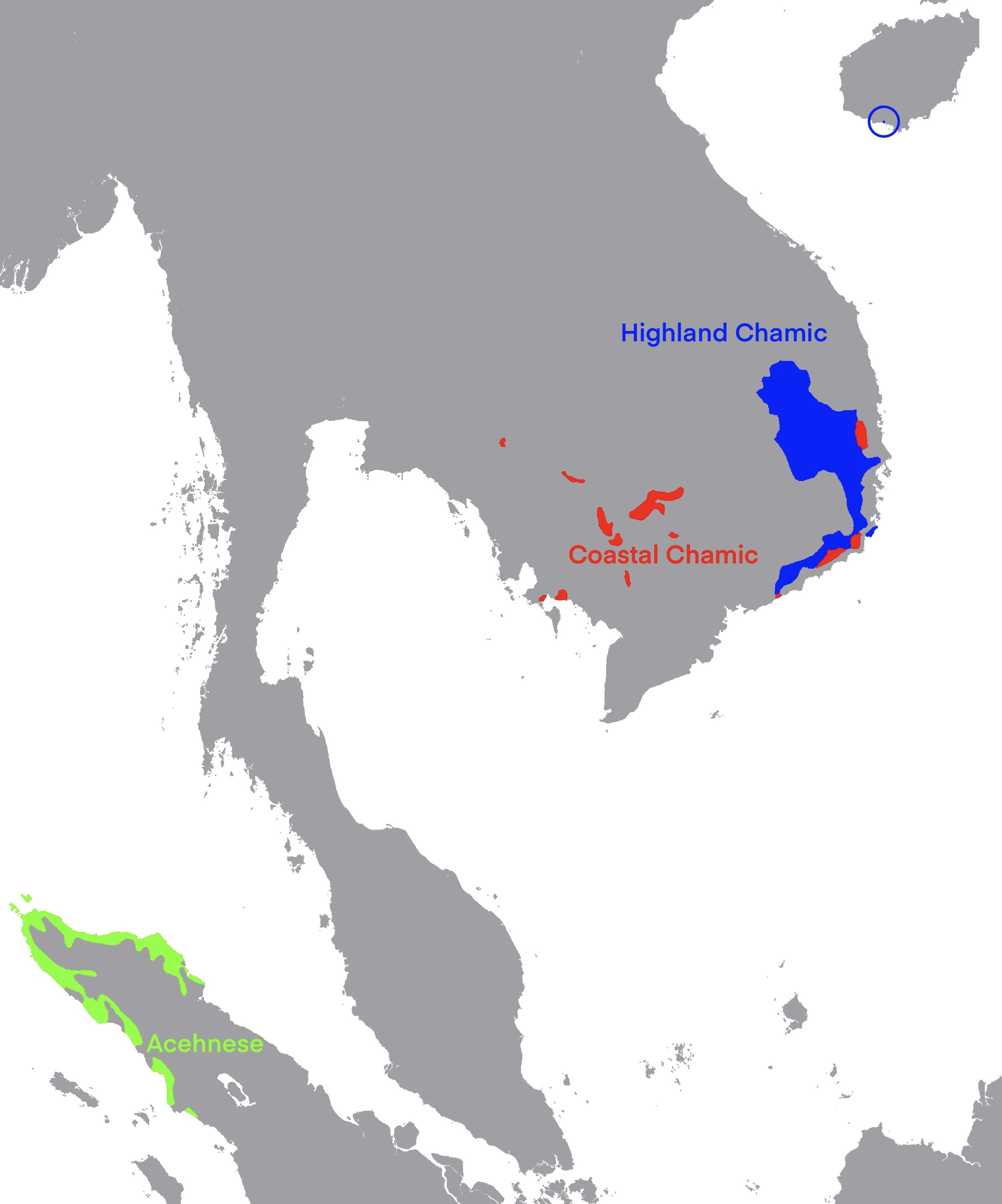
- Varieties of the Chamic languages

The Chamic languages, also known as Aceh–Chamic and Acehnese–Chamic, are a group of ten languages spoken in Aceh (Sumatra, Indonesia) and in parts of Cambodia, Thailand, Vietnam and Hainan, China. The Chamic languages are a subgroup of Malayo-Polynesian languages in the Austronesian family. The ancestor of this subfamily, proto-Chamic, is associated with the Sa Huỳnh culture, its speakers arriving in what is now Vietnam from Formosa.

The most widely spoken Chamic languages are Acehnese with about 3.5 million speakers, Cham with about 280,000, and Jarai with about 230,000. Tsat is the most northern and least spoken, with only 3000 speakers by the Utsuls in Hainan.

== History ==
Cham has the oldest literary history of any Austronesian language. The Dong Yen Chau inscription, written in Old Cham, dates from the late 4th century AD.

Extensive borrowing resulting from long-term contact has caused Chamic and the Bahnaric languages, a branch of the Austroasiatic family, to have many vocabulary items in common.

== Classification ==
Graham Thurgood gives the following classification for the Chamic languages. Individual languages are marked by italics.

Speakers of Acehnese.

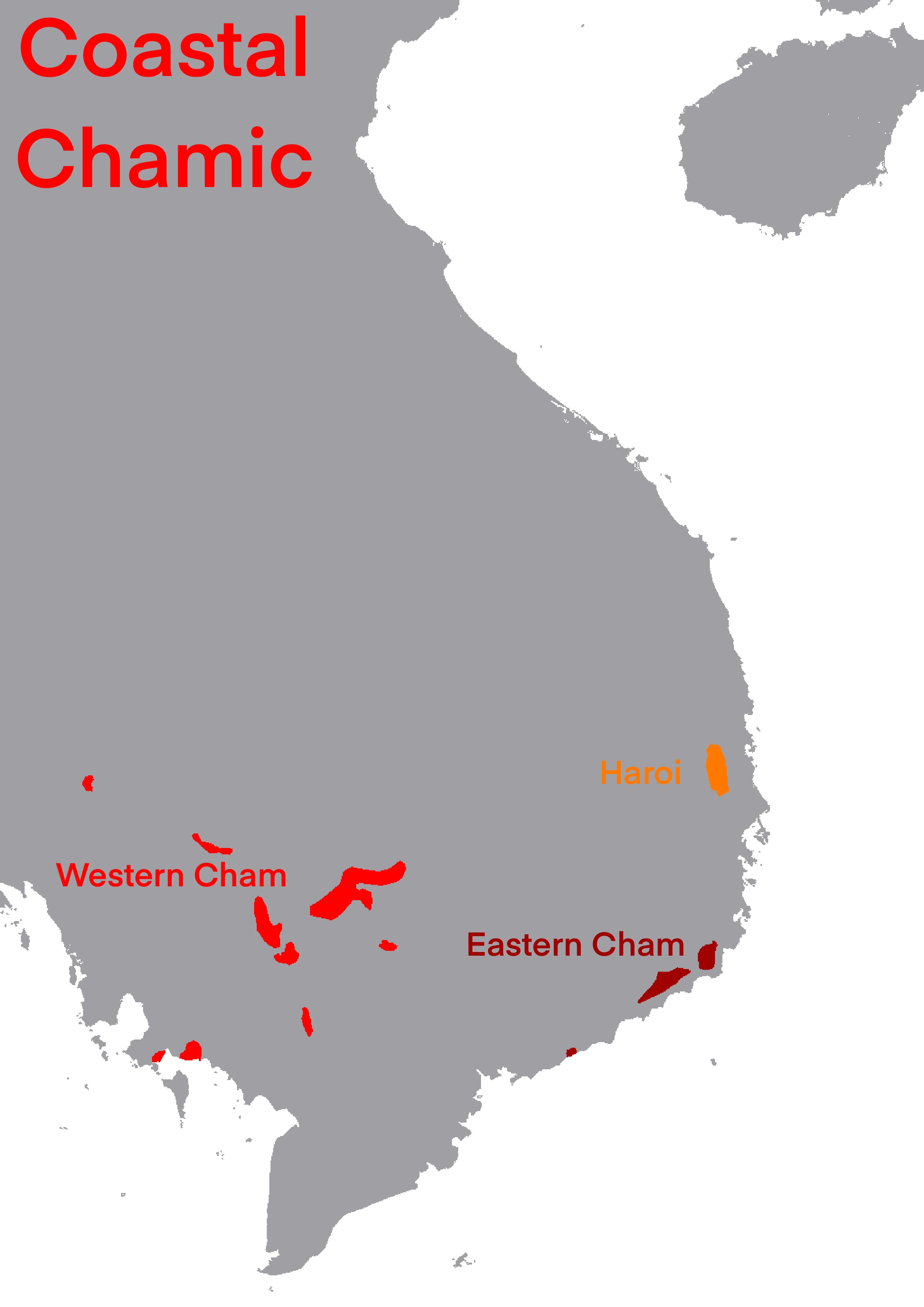
Coastal Chamic language

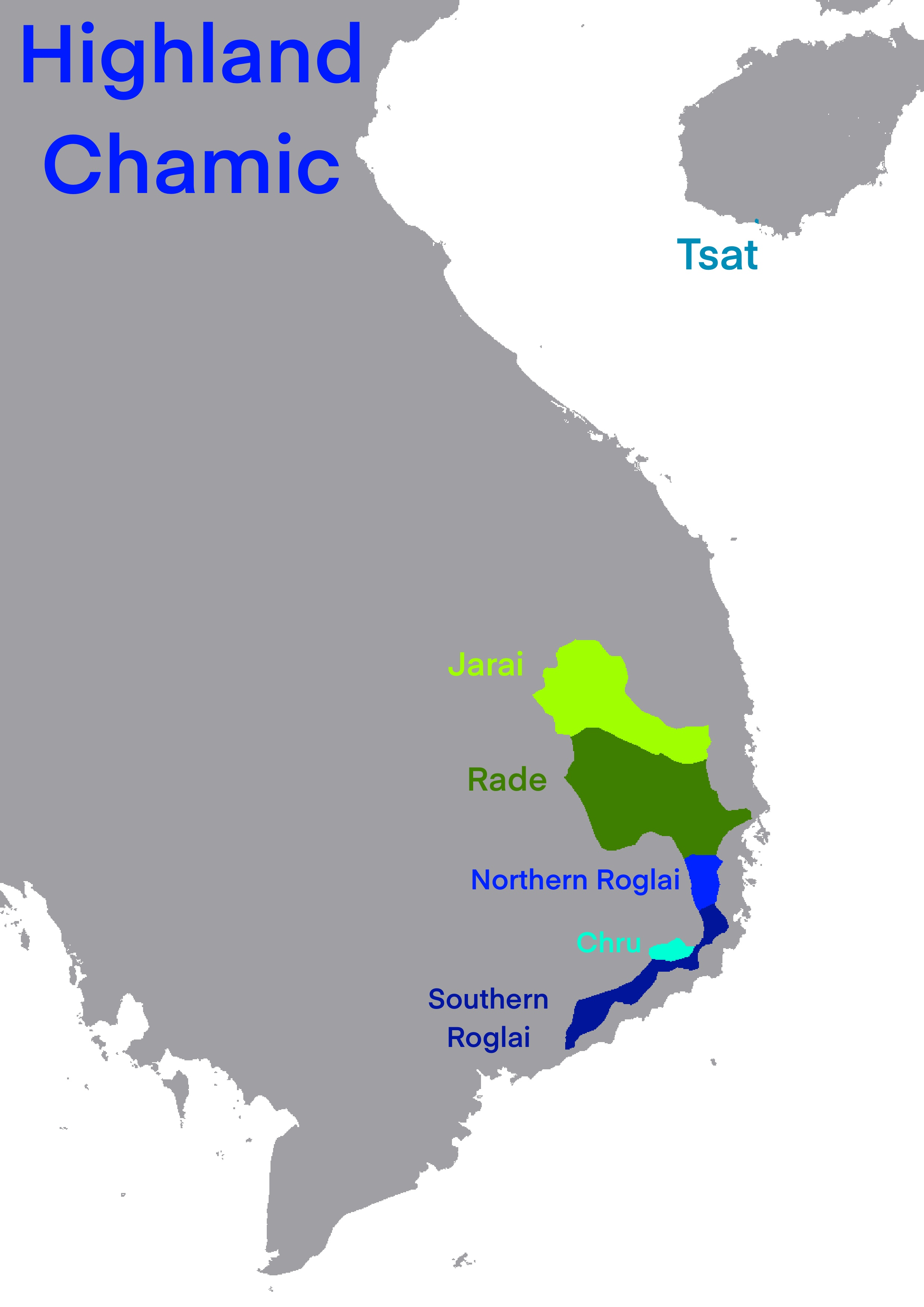
Highland Chamic language

- Chamic
  - Acehnese
  - Coastal Chamic
    - Haroi (Vietnamese: H'roi)
    - Cham (Vietnamese: Chăm)
      - Western Cham
      - Eastern Cham (Panduranga Cham)
  - Highlands Chamic
    - Rade–Jarai
      - Bih (Note: According to Glottolog 5.1 (2024) it is classified as a separate language. But its classification is still doubtful, some linguists consider it as a Rade dialect.)
      - Rade (Vietnamese: Ê-đê)
      - Jarai (Vietnamese: Gia Rai)
    - Chru–Northern
      - Chru (Vietnamese: Chu Ru)
      - Northern Cham
        - Roglai (Vietnamese: Ra Glai)
          - Northern Roglai
          - Southern Roglai
        - Tsat

The Proto-Chamic numerals from 7 to 9 are shared with those of the Malayic languages, providing partial evidence for a Malayo-Chamic subgrouping.

Roger Blench also proposes that there may have been at least one other Austroasiatic branch in coastal Vietnam that is now extinct, based on various Austroasiatic loanwords in modern-day Chamic languages that cannot be clearly traced to existing Austroasiatic branches.

== Reconstruction ==
Proto-Chamic
- Reconstruction of: Chamic languages
- Reconstructed ancestors: Proto-Austronesian: Proto-Malayo-Polynesian

The Proto-Chamic reconstructed below is from Graham Thurgood's 1999 publication From Ancient Cham to Modern Dialects.

=== Consonants ===
The following table of Proto-Chamic presyllabic consonants are from Thurgood. There are a total of 13–14 presyllabic consonants depending on whether or not *ɲ is counted. Non-presyllabic consonants include *ʔ, *ɓ, *ɗ, *ŋ, *y, *w. Aspirated consonants are also reconstructable for Proto-Chamic.

Proto-Chamic Presyllabic Consonants
		Bilabial	Alveolar	Palatal	Velar	Glottal
Plosive	Voiceless	p	t	c	k	
Plosive	Voiced	b	d	ɟ	ɡ	
Nasal		m		ɲ		
Lateral			l			
Tap or trill			r			
Fricative			s			h

The following consonant clusters are reconstructed for Proto-Chamic: *pl-, *bl-, *kl-, *gl-, *pr-, *tr-, *kr-, *br-, *dr-. Initial *n did not exist, it was replaced by *l instead (*nanaq → *lanah "pus").

=== Vowels ===
There are four vowels (*-a, *-i, *-u, and *-e, or alternatively *-ə) and three diphthongs (*-ay, *-uy, *-aw).

Proto-Chamic Vowels
Height	Front	Central	Back
Close	i /i/		u /u/
Mid	e /e/	([ə /ə/])	
Open		a /a/	

=== Morphology ===
Reconstructed Proto-Chamic morphological components are:

- *tə-: the "inadvertent" prefix
- *mə-: common verb prefix
- *pə-: causative prefix
- *bɛʔ-: negative imperative prefix (borrowed from Austroasiatic languages)
- *-əm-: nominalizing infix
- *-ən-: instrumental infix (borrowed from Austroasiatic languages)

=== Pronouns ===
Proto-Chamic has the following personal pronouns:

Singular

- *kəu – 'I' (familiar)
- *hulun – 'I' (polite); 'slave'
- *dahlaʔ – 'I' (polite)
- *hã – 'you; thou'
- *ñu – 'he, she; they'

Plural

- *kaməi – 'we' (exclusive)
- *ta – 'we' (inclusive)
- *drəi – 'we' (inclusive); reflexive
- *gəp – other; group (borrowed from Austroasiatic languages)

=== Proto-Chamic and Chamic lexical correspondences ===
Proto-Chamic, Mainland Chamic, Acehnese and Malay comparative table:

Gloss	Proto-Chamic	Western Cham	Eastern Cham	Roglai	Aceh	Malay	Terengganu
one	*sa	/sa ha/	/tha/	/sa/	/s̻̪a/ sa	satu	se
seven	*tujuh	/taçuh/	/taçŭh/	/tijuh/	/t̠uɟoh/ tujôh	tujuh	tujoh
fire	*ʔapuy	/pui/	/apuy/	/apui/	/apui̯/ apui	api	api
sky	*laŋit	/laŋiʔ/	/laŋiʔ/ Lingik	/laŋĩːʔ/	/laŋɛt̠/ langèt	langit	langik
rice (husked)	*braːs	/prah/	/prah-l/	/bra/	/brɯə̯h/ breueh	beras	bghah
iron	*bisεy	/pasay/	/pithăy/	/pisǝy/	/bɯs̻̪ɔə̯/ beusoe	besi	besi
sugarcane	*tabɔw-v	/tapau/	/tapăw/	/tubəu/	/t̠ɯbɛə̯/ teubèe	tebu	tebu

== Bibliography ==
- Sidwell, Paul (2009). Classifying the Austroasiatic Languages: History and State of the Art. LINCOM Europa. Archived from the original on 2019-03-24.
- Thurgood, Graham (1999). From Ancient Cham to Modern Dialects: Two Thousand Years of Language Contact and Change: With an Appendix of Chamic Reconstructions and Loanwords. Oceanic Linguistics Special Publications. University of Hawai'i Press. pp. i, iii–vii, ix–xiii, xv–xvii, 1–259, 261–275, 277–397, 399–407. ISBN 0824821319. JSTOR 20006770.
