= Jarai language =

Chamic language of Vietnam and Cambodia

Jarai
- Tơlơi Jrai
- Native to: Vietnam, Cambodia
- Region: Central Highlands, Vietnam; Ratanakiri Province, Cambodia
- Native speakers: 530,000 (2019)
- Language family: Austronesian: Malayo-Polynesian; Malayo-Sumbawan (?); Chamic; Highlands; Jarai
- Writing system: Vietnam: modified Vietnamese alphabet

Official status
- Recognised minority language in: Vietnam; Cambodia

Language codes
- ISO 639-3: jra
- Glottolog: jara1266

Jarai (/dʒəˈraɪ/; Vietnamese: tiếng Gia Rai or Tiếng Jrai; Khmer: ចារ៉ាយ, Charay [caːraːj]) is a Malayo-Polynesian language spoken by the Jarai people of Vietnam and Cambodia. The speakers of Jarai number approximately 530,000, not including other possible Jarai communities in countries other than Vietnam and Cambodia such as United States of America. They are the largest of the upland ethnic groups of Vietnam's Central Highlands known as Degar or Montagnards, and 25 per cent of the population in the Cambodian province of Ratanakiri.

The language is in the Chamic subgroup of the Malayo-Polynesian languages, and is thus related to the Cham language of central Vietnam.

A number of Jarai also live in the United States, having resettled there following the Vietnam War.

== Classification ==
The Jarai language belongs to Chamic branch of the Malayo-Polynesian languages. Although often classified as a Mon-Khmer language until the 20th century, the affiliation of Jarai to the Chamic sister languages Cham and Rade, and a wider connection to Malay was already recognized as early as 1864.

== Geographic distribution and dialects ==
Jarai is spoken by some 262,800 people in Cambodia and Vietnam (Simons, 2017), where it is recognized as an official minority language, although in Cambodia it does not have its own Khmer scripts orthography. Additionally, there are several hundred Jarai speakers in the United States of America, as a result of the Jarai refugees settling in the USA after the Vietnamese War. Jarai dialects can be mutually unintelligible. Đào Huy Quyền (1998) lists the following subgroups of Jarai dialects and their respective locations:

- Jarai Pleiku in the Pleiku area;
- Jarai Cheoreo in AJunPa (Phú Bổn);
- Jarai ARáp in northwest Pleiku, and southwest Kon Tum.
- Jarai H’dRung in northeast Pleiku, and southeast Kon Tum.
- Jarai Tbuan in west Pleiku.

Other related groups include:

- HRoi in west Phú Yên, and south Bình Định. Mixed Ede and Jarai people.
- M’dhur in south Phú Yên. Mixed Ede and Jarai people.
- Hàlang in southwest Kon Tum, and in Laos and Cambodia. Mixed Sedang and Jarai people.

== Phonology ==
Influenced by the surrounding Mon–Khmer languages, words of the various Chamic languages of Southeast Asia, including Jarai, have become disyllabic with the stress on the second syllable. Additionally, Jarai has further evolved in the pattern of Mon–Khmer, losing almost all vowel distinction in the initial minor syllable. While trisyllabic words do exist, they are all loanwords. The typical Jarai word may be represented:

(C)(V)-C(C)V(V)(C)

where the values in parentheses are optional and "(C)" in the cluster "C(C)" represents a liquid consonant /l/, /r/ or a semivowel /w/, /j/. In Jarai dialects spoken in Cambodia, the "(C)" in the cluster "C(C)" can also be the voiced velar fricative /ɣ/, a phoneme used by the Jarai in Cambodia, but not attested in Vietnam. The vowel of the first syllable in disyllabic words is most often the mid-central unrounded vowel, /ə/, unless the initial consonant is the glottal stop /ʔ/. The second vowel of the stressed syllable produces a diphthong.

=== Vowels ===
There are 9 vowels:

	Front		Central		Back	
	oral	nasal	oral	nasal	unr.	rnd.
Close	i	ĩ			ɯ	u
Close-mid	e		ə			o
Open-mid	ɛ		ə			ɔ
Open			a	ã		

=== Consonants ===
There are 24 consonants:

		Labial	Dental/ Alveolar	Postalv./ Palatal	Velar	Glottal
Plosive/ Affricate	tenuis	p	t	tʃ	k	ʔ
Plosive/ Affricate	aspirated	pʰ	tʰ		kʰ	
Plosive/ Affricate	voiced	b	d	dʒ	ɡ	
Implosive		ɓ	ɗ	ʄ		
Fricative			s			h
Nasal	plain	m	n	ɲ	ŋ	
Nasal	pre-glottal	ˀm				
Tap			ɾ			
Approximant		w	l	j		

The implosives have also been described as preglottalized stops, but Jensen (2013) describes that the closure of glottis and oral cavity occur simultaneously.

== Orthography ==
At the beginning of the 20th century, during the period of French Indochina, colonisers introduced a writing system for Jarai based on the Vietnamese alphabet. After the Vietnam War, Christian missionaries in Vietnam used the orthography to translate the Bible into Jarai language. Literacy in Jarai has increased, and there are today many publications geared towards the Vietnamese Jarai.

The orthography uses 40 letters, many of which contain diacritics: 21 symbols for consonants, and 19 symbols for vowels. Unlike systems like those to write Maori, Latvian and other languages, the Jarai orthography adds diacritics to mark short vowels, namely the breve: ⟨ĭ ĕ ă ŏ ŭ ơ̆ ư̆⟩. Like in Vietnamese spelling, double diacritics are also used in Jarai: short /e o/ are represented as ⟨ ê̆ ô̆ ⟩. Aspirated /pʰ tʰ kʰ/ are written as digraphs ⟨ph th kh⟩, and /ŋ/ is represented as ⟨ng⟩. The b with a stroke ⟨ƀ⟩ is a special character used for Jarai and closely related languages. Additionally, the hacek and tilde are also added to ⟨c⟩ and ⟨n⟩ for to represent /t͡ʃ/ and /ɲ/, respectively: ⟨č ñ⟩.

1–10	Aa	Ăă	Ââ	Bb	Ƀƀ	Čč	Dd	Đđ	Ee	Ĕĕ
IPA	aː	a	ɨ	b	ʔb ~ ɓ	tʃ	d	ʔd ~ ɗ	ɛː	ɛ
11–20	Êê	Ê̆ê̆	Gg	Hh	Ii	Ĭĭ	Jj	Dj dj	Kk	Ll
IPA	eː	e	ɡ	h	iː	i	dʒ	ʔdʒ ~ ʄ	k	l
21–30	Mm	Nn	Ññ	Ng ng	Oo	Ŏŏ	Ôô	Ô̆ô̆	Ơơ	Ơ̆ơ̆
IPA	m	n	ɲ	ŋ	ɔː	ɔ	oː	o	əː	ə
31–40	Pp	Rr	Ss	Tt	Uu	Ŭŭ	Ưư	Ư̆ư̆	Ww	Yy
IPA	p	ɾ	s	t	uː	u	ɯː	ɯ	w	j

== Sample text ==
Abih bang mơnuih-mơnam tơkeng rai rơngai laih anŭn mơdơ̆-mơđơr amăng tơlơi pơpŭ-pơyôm hăng tơlơi dưi. Ƀing gơñu tŭ hơmâo tơlơi pơmĭn hăng tơlơi thâo djơ̆-glaĭ laih anŭn brơi ngă kơ tơdruă amăng tơlơi khăp ayŏng adơi.

=== Phonemic transcription ===
/ abiːh baːŋ məˈnuih məˈnaːm təˈkeːŋ ɾai ɾəˈŋai laih aˈnun məˈdəʔ məˈdəɾ aˈmaŋ təˈləi pəˈpuʔ pəˈjoːm haŋ təˈləi dɯi ɓiːŋ gəˈɲuː tuʔ həˈmaw təˈləi pəˈmin haŋ təˈləi tʰaw ʄəʔ glai laih aˈnuːn bɾəi ŋaʔ kəː təˈdɾua aˈmaŋ təˈləi kʰap aˈjoŋ aˈdəi /

=== Translation ===
All human beings are born free and equal in dignity and rights. They are endowed with reason and conscience and should act towards one another in a spirit of brotherhood.

(Article 1 of the Universal Declaration of Human Rights)

== Morphosyntax ==
Personal pronouns

Jarai does not distinguish gender in pronouns.

Pronouns in Jarai
	Clusivity	Singular	Plural
First	Inclusive	kâo	ta
First	Exclusive	-	gơmơi
Second		ih	gih
Third		ñu	gơñu
