= List of Revolutionary Girl Utena chapters =

This is a list of chapters for the manga series Revolutionary Girl Utena, written and illustrated by Chiho Saito based on a story by Be-Papas.

== Revolutionary Girl Utena ==
Revolutionary Girl Utena began serialization in the June 1996 issue of Shogakukan's monthly shōjo manga magazine Ciao. The series ended in 1998, with five tankōbon volumes being released. It was licensed for an English-language release in North America by Viz Media in 2000, first serialized in Viz's manga magazine Animerica Extra and later published in five trade paperback volumes from 2002 to 2004. Viz re-released the series in a two-volume hardcover box set on April 11, 2017.

No.	Original release date	Original ISBN	North American release date	North American ISBN
01	January 20, 1997 (O); November 10, 2017 (R)	978-4091360847 (O); 978-4-09-139814-7 (R)	January 9, 2002	978-1569317136
02	April 20, 1997 (O); November 10, 2017 (R)	4-09-136085-8 (O); 978-4-09-139815-4 (R)	August 5, 2002	978-1591160304
03	September 20, 1997 (O); December 8, 2017 (R)	4-09-136086-6 (O); 978-4-09-139816-1 (R)	April 30, 2003	978-1569318126
04	January 20, 1998 (O); December 8, 2017 (R)	4-09-136087-4 (O); 978-4-09-139817-8 (R)	October 1, 2003	978-1591160687
05	May 20, 1998 (O); January 10, 2018 (R)	4-09-136088-2 (O); 978-4-09-139818-5 (R)	March 3, 2004	978-1591161455

== Revolutionary Girl Utena: The Adolescence of Utena ==
A manga adaptation of the 1999 film Adolescence of Utena written and illustrated by Saito was serialized from May to September 1999 in the manga magazine Bessatsu Shōjo Comic Special. While the manga is not a one-to-one adaptation of the film, it broadly incorporates its major plot points; Saito has commented that she regards the manga as a more direct story, while the film is more thematic and abstract. As the manga was published in a special edition of Bessatsu Shōjo Comic aimed at a josei audience (older teenage girls and adult women), it maintains a more mature tone relative to the original Revolutionary Girl Utena manga and anime. An English-language translation of the manga licensed by Viz Media was serialized in Animerica Extra before being published as a collected volume by Viz on November 11, 2004.

No.	Original release date	Original ISBN	North American release date	North American ISBN
01	September 20, 1999 (O); January 10, 2018 (R)	4-09-136089-0 (O); 978-4-09-139819-2 (R)	November 11, 2004	978-1591165002

== Revolutionary Girl Utena: After the Revolution ==
On May 20, 2017, Shogakukan announced that the first chapter of an Utena sequel series written and illustrated by Saito, Revolutionary Girl Utena: After the Revolution, would be published in the September issue of its monthly josei manga magazine Flowers. Two additional chapters were published in the March and May 2018 issues. Released to commemorate the 20th anniversary of the release of the anime series, After the Revolution depicts the lives of the primary cast 20 years after the events of the original series. Shogakukan collected all three chapters into a single tankōbon volume on May 10, 2018. An English-language translation of After the Revolution was published by Viz Media on October 6, 2020,

No.	Original release date	Original ISBN	North American release date	North American ISBN
01	May 10, 2018	978-4-09-870119-3	October 6, 2020	978-1-97-471514-5
