= List of Urusei Yatsura chapters =

Cover art of the first tankōbon volume, featuring lead characters Ataru Moroboshi and Lum.

Urusei Yatsura is a Japanese manga series written and illustrated Rumiko Takahashi that premiered in Weekly Shōnen Sunday in 1978 and ran sporadically until its conclusion in 1987. It follows the humorous adventures of Ataru Moroboshi, and the alien Lum, who believes she is Ataru's wife after he accidentally proposes to her. A total of 34 individual volumes with 11 chapters each were released in tankōbon format between 1980 and March 1987. The series was printed in 15 wideban editions between July 1989 and August 1990. A bunkoban edition of the series was released over 17 volumes between August 1998 and December 1999. A "My First Big" edition was printed between July 2000 and September 2004. A shinsōban edition over 34 volumes was released between November 17, 2006, and March 18, 2008.

After requests from fans, Viz Media licensed the series for release in English across North America in 1989 under the title of Lum * Urusei Yatsura. They released it in a monthly comic book format that contained two stories per issue. Despite a strong start, the series was dropped after eight issues and one graphic novel in 1990. The manga was then reintroduced in Viz's monthly Animerica magazine and was retitled The Return of Lum Urusei Yatsura because of the long gap. The monthly comic books and collected graphic novels resumed in 1994 and 1995 respectively. The English release stopped in 2000 after eight graphic novels. Viz's release roughly corresponded to the first 11 volumes of the Japanese tankōbon edition, but with several chapters excluded.

On July 19, 2018, Viz announced that they re-licensed the manga with plans to release it in a 2-in-1 omnibus edition with new translations. Based on the Japanese shinsōban, the first volume was published on February 19, 2019, and the seventeenth and last on February 19, 2023.

== Volume list ==
=== Tankōbon edition ===
No.	Japanese release date	Japanese ISBN
1	April 15, 1980	4-09-120441-4
001. "Young Love on the Run" (かけめぐる青春, Kakemeguru Seishun); 002. "Gentle Imp" (やさしい悪魔, Yasashī Akuma); 003. "The Sad Sound of Rain" (悲しき雨音, Kanashiki Amaoto); 004. "Present for You" (あなたにあげる, Anata ni Ageru); 005. "Between a Rock and a Hard Place" (絶体絶命, Zettaizetsumei); 006. "To Kill with Love" (愛で殺したい, Ai de Koroshitai); 007. "A Contemptible Good-for-Nothing" (憎みきれないろくでなし, Nikumi Kirenai Rokude Nashi); 008. "Good Day for a Departure" (いい日旅立ち, Ī Hi Tabidachi); 009. "Showdown" (大勝負, Ōshōbu)
2	July 15, 1980	4-09-120442-2
010. "Oyuki" (お雪); 011. "Eros" (性（さが）, Saga); 012. "Intention" (系図, Keizu; lit. 'Family Tree'); 013. "Puppet" (あやつり人形, Ayatsuriningyō); 014. "Still Waters Run Deep" (いまだ浮上せず, Imada Fujō Sezu); 015. "The Yellow Ribbon of Happiness" (幸せの黄色いリボン, Shiawase no Kiiroi Ribon); 016. "Become a Woman and Start Over!" (女になって出直せよ, Onna ni Natte Denaoseyo); 017. "Obsession Is a Part of Love" (思い過ごしも恋のうち, Omoi Sugoshi mo Koi no Uchi)
3	October 15, 1980	4-09-120443-0
018. "Father, You Were Strong" (父よあなたは強かった, Chichiyo Anata wa Tsuyokatta); 019. "Disco Inferno" (ディスコ・インフェルノ, Disuko Inferuno); 020. "Without Even Saying Goodbye" (さよならを言う気もない, Sayonara o Iu Kimonai); 021. "If There Be Courage" (勇気があれば, Yūkigāreba); 022. "Trouble Rains Down" (トラブルは舞い降りた!!, Toraburu wa Maiorita!!); 023. "Zodiac Cycles" (星座はめぐる, Seiza wa Meguru); 024. "Balmy Spring Days and the Failure Class" (春のうららの落第教室, Haru no Urara no Rakudai Kyōshitsu); 025. "Love and Suffering" (ツノる思いが地獄をまねく, Tsunoru Omoi ga Jigoku o Maneku); 026. "How I've Waited for You" (君まてども..., Kimi Matedomo...)
4	January 15, 1981	4-09-120444-9
027. "Sake and Tears and Men and Women" (酒と泪と男と女, Sake to Namida to Otoko to Onna); 028. "Diary of Tears" (涙の日記, Namida no Nikki); 029. "Who's That Baby?" (この子はだあれ？, Kono Ko wa Daare?); 030. "Amazed in a Maze" (迷路でメロメロ, Meiro de Mero Mero); 031. "Waking Up to a Nightmare" (目覚めたら悪夢, Mezametara Akumu); 032. "4-D Camera" (四次元カメラ, Shi-jigen Kamera); 033. "Exquisite Departure" (美しい旅立ち, Utsukushī Tabidachi); 034. "Since Your Parting" (君去りし後（のち）, Kimi Sarishi Nochi); 035. "Magic Running" (魔のランニング, Ma no Ranningu); 036. "Tanabata Date" (七夕デート, Tanabata Dēto)
5	March 15, 1981	4-09-120445-7
037. "Sakura Sensei, Enchanted Blossom" (妖花・サクラ先生, Yōka Sakura-sensei); 038. "Everybody in the Rain" (みんな雨ン中..., Minna Ame nchū...); 039. "Ghost Story: Xerox Man" (怪談・コピー人間, Kaidan Kopī Ningen); 040. "Youth Devoted to the White Ball" (白球にかけた青春, Hakkyū ni Kaketa Seishun); 041. "The Red-Cloaked Phantom" (怪人赤マント, Kaijin Aka Manto); 042. "Surfin' SOS" (サーフィンSOS, Sāfin SOS); 043. "Bathing Suit Bandit" (水着ドロボウ, Mizugi Dorobō); 044. "Snatch the Bikini" (ビキニを奪え, Bikini o Ubae); 045. "Food Fight" (マンナンウォーズ, Mannan Wōzu); 046. "Yoga Meditation" (ヨガで迷想, Yoga de Meisō); 047. "A Tragic Date" (哀愁でいと, Aishūdeito)
6	June 15, 1981	4-09-120446-5
048. "Private Lesson" (個人教授, Kojin Kyōju); 049. "No Crying on the Court" (コートの中では泣かないわ, Kōto no Nakade wa Nakanai wa); 050. "Love Disappears on the Court" (コートに消える恋, Kōto ni Kieru Koi); 051. "Parents' Day Horrors" (戦慄の参観日, Senritsu no Sankan-bi); 052. "Kunoichi, Running in Nara" (くノ一、奈良を走る..., Kunoichi, Nara o Hashiru...); 053. "Kunoichi, Lurking in Kyoto" (くノ一、京に潜む..., Kunoichi, Kyō ni Hisomu...); 054. "Kunoichi Forever" (くノ一は永遠に..., Kunoichi wa Eien ni...); 055. "Sports Festival Close Call" (体育祭危機一髪..., Taiikusai Kikiippatsu...); 056. "Cultural Festival Close Call" (文化祭危機一髪..., Bunkasai Kikiippatsu...); 057. "Drama Festival Close Call" (演劇祭危機一髪..., Engekisai Kikiippatsu...); 058. "Farewell Party Close Call" (お別れパーティー危機一髪..., Owakare Pātī Kikiippatsu...)
7	September 15, 1981	4-09-120447-3
059. "Memories and a Close Call" (思い出危機一髪..., Omoide Kikiippatsu...); 060. "Genuine Close Call" (正真正銘危機一髪..., Shōshinshōmei Kikiippatsu...); 061. "Ataru Retires" (あたるの引退, Ataru no Intai); 062. "Fortune Fear" (おみくじこわい, Omikuji Kowai); 063. "Ten is Here" (テンちゃんがきた, Ten-chan ga Kita); 064. "Ten's Love" (テンちゃんの恋, Ten-chan no Koi); 065. "A Date for Just the Two of Us" (ふたりだけのデート, Futari Dake no Dēto); 066. "From Flower to Flower" (花から花へ, Hana kara Hana e); 067. "Bean-Shooter for Ogres" (鬼に豆鉄砲, Oni ni Mamedeppō); 068. "Miss Snow Queen" (ミス雪の女王, Misu Yuki no Joō); 069. "Valentine's Day Disaster" (バレンタインデーの惨劇, Barentain Dē no Sangeki)
8	November 15, 1981	4-09-120448-1
070. "The Ant Trap of Love" (恋のアリ地獄, Koi no Ari Jigoku); 071. "Peach Blossom Poetry Slam" (桃の花歌合戦, Momo no Hana Utagassen); 072. "Eerie Earmuffs" (イヤーマッフルの怪, Iyāmaffuru no Kai); 073. "Beware the Fearsome Meow-Meow" (ニャオンの恐怖にゃ気をつけろ!!, Nyaon no Kyōfu Nya Kiwotsukero!!); 074. "The Flying Chaos Quartet" (大空に舞うハチャメチャ四人組!!, Ōzora ni Mau Hachamecha Yo-ningumi!!); 075. "The Heian Arc, Scroll One" (平安編 壱の巻, Heian-hen Ichi no Maki); 076. "The Heian Arc, Scroll Two" (平安編 弐の巻, Heian-hen Ni no Maki); 077. "The Heian Arc, Scroll Three" (平安編 参の巻, Heian-hen San no Maki); 078. "Love and School Violence" ("愛"それは校内暴力とともに, "Ai" Sore wa Kōnai Bōryoku to Tomoni); 079. "Oh, Library!" (ああ、図書館, Ā, Toshokan); 080. "Children's Day Fright!" (ああ、子供の日は恐怖じゃ！, Ā, Kodomo no Hi wa Kyōfu ja!)
9	January 15, 1982	4-09-120449-X
081. "Oh, Children! Set Your Aspirations High!" (幼児たちよ、大志を抱け!!, Yōji-tachi yo, Taishi o Idake!!); 082. "The Swallow and the Penguin" (ツバメさんとペンギンさん, Tsubame-san to Pengin-san); 083. "A Century by Age Three" (三つ子の魂、百までも！, Mitsugo no Tamashī, Hyaku Made mo!); 084. "Her Majesty and the Amorous Rugby Player" (女王陛下と愛のラガーマン!!, Joōheika to Ai no Ragāman!!); 085. "Revenge of the Protozoa" (原生動物の逆襲, Gensei Dōbutsu no Gyakushū); 086. "Home Is Where You Find It" (住めば都, Sumeba Miyako); 087. "Deranged Marriage, Part 1" (見合いコワし = その1 =, Miai Kowashi -Sono 1-); 088. "Deranged Marriage, Part 2" (見合いコワし = その2 =, Miai Kowashi -Sono 2-); 089. "Deranged Marriage, Part 3" (見合いコワし = その3 =, Miai Kowashi -Sono 3-); 090. "Deranged Marriage, Part 4" (見合いコワし = その4 =, Miai Kowashi -Sono 4-); 091. "Marine Garbage Disposal" (生ゴミ、海へ, Namagomi, Umi e)
10	March 15, 1982	4-09-120450-3
092. "O, Rain! Rain and Rain More! Part 1" (雨よ降れ降れ、もっと降れ！ = その1 =, Ame yo Fure Fure, Motto Fure! -Sono 1-); 093. "O, Rain! Rain and Rain More! Part 2" (雨よ降れ降れ、もっと降れ！ = その2 =, Ame yo Fure Fure, Motto Fure! -Sono 2-); 094. "O, Rain! Rain and Rain More! Part 3" (雨よ降れ降れ、もっと降れ！ = その3 =, Ame yo Fure Fure, Motto Fure! -Sono 3-); 095. "Panic at the Haunted Inn" (パニックin幽霊民宿, Panikku in Yūrei Minshuku); 096. "The Selfish Ghost" (わがまま幽霊, Wagamama Yūrei); 097. "Beach Mystery" (海辺の怪, Umibe no Kai); 098. "Typhoon Fun" (台風は楽し, Taifū wa Tanoshi); 099. "Secret Mission: Date Stakeout" (秘密指令"デートをのぞけ！", Himitsu Shirei "Dēto o Nozoke!"); 100. "It's No Fun Being Sick!" (風邪イヤですね！, Kaze Iya Desu ne!); 101. "A Different Dracula" (翔んだドラキュラ, Tonda Dorakyura); 102. "Blood Drive of Love" (愛の献血運動, Ai no Kenketsu Undō)
11	June 15, 1982	4-09-120741-3
103. "Adverse Effects" (薬口害); 104. "Urgent Prayers!" (苦しいときの神だのみ!!); 105. "Sun Goddess Banquet" (アマテラス宴会); 106. "The Great Off-Campus Snack Battle" (買い食い大戦争); 107. "Copy de Date" (コピーdeデート！, Kopī de Dēto!); 108. "Those Were the Days, PC!" (昔なつかし、ぐちれよパソコン！, Mukashi Natsukashi, Guchire yo Pasokon!); 109. "Hornless?!" (おれのツノがない?!, Ore no Tsuno ga Nai?!); 110. "Studying Mayhem" (自習騒動); 111. "There's a Cat on the Stairs!" (階段に猫がおんねん！); 112. "Pickled" (酔っぱらいブギ); 113. "Forget-the-Year Party!" (忘年会じゃあ！)
12	September 15, 1982	4-09-120742-1
114. "A Strange New Year at the Mendo Estate" (面倒邸新年怪); 115. "Tales of a Wandering Snowman" (旅の雪ダルマ情話); 116. "The Coffee Shop Ban" (喫茶店への出入りを禁ず!!); 117. "Locker Inspections" (所持品検査だ！); 118. "Alien Invasion" (部外者ちん入); 119. "Valentine's Disillusion" (惑わじのバレンタイン!!); 120. "Deadly Peril in the Classroom" (命かけます、授業中!!); 121. "Mendo Siblings! Part 1" (面堂兄妹!! = その1 =); 122. "Mendo Siblings! Part 2" (面堂兄妹!! = その2 =); 123. "Hello, Sailor Suits!" (セーラー服よ、こんにちは！); 124. "A Gift from Ten" (テンからの贈り物!!)
13	October 15, 1982	4-09-120743-X
125. "Super Musashi, Sprint to the Heavens!" (スーパー武蔵、天までダッシュ!!); 126. "Musashi, in Training!" (武蔵、ただいま修行中!!); 127. "Bad Boy Musashi, Be a Man!" (ダメッ子武蔵、男やないか!!); 128. "Terror of the Willow Ghost?!" (柳精翁の恐怖!?); 129. "Enemy Ten" (テン敵); 130. "Fossil Backcountry" (化石の僻地); 131. "Cavity Wars" (虫歯WARS!!); 132. "Wash Away the Jade Blossom in the Tub" (湯舟に浮かぶ銭の花を流せ!!); 133. "Domestic Spat Settlement" (夫婦ゲンカ始末記); 134. "The Grateful Raccoon" (タヌキが"ツルの恩返し"); 135. "Mendo Residence Masquerade Ball" (面堂家仮面ぶとう会)
14	December 15, 1982	4-09-120744-8
136. "Kurama Again!" (クラマ再び!!); 137. "Sealed with a Kiss!" (口づけと共に契らん!!); 138. "Goodbye, Covenant!" (掟、おさらば!!); 139. "Message in a Bottle" (ビン詰めの誘惑!!); 140. "Ghastly Gastronomy!" (食べれば恐怖（サスペンス）!!); 141. "Baseball Shenanigans" (校内賭博球技大会); 142. "Spicy Camping Calamity" (辛いキャンプに明日はない!!); 143. "Paranormal Peachy Parable" (桃源郷奇談!!); 144. "The Perfidy of the Sakura Triplets" (三人サクラ浮気の構図); 145. "Dolphin Dating and Beach Babe Patrol" (デートとイルカと海辺の浮気); 146. "Keep Our Beaches Clean" (みんなで海をきれいにしよう！)
15	April 15, 1983	4-09-120745-6
147. "Family Feud" (激闘、父子鷹!!); 148. "Hello, Sailor Suit!" (セーラー服よ、コンにちは!!); 149. "Bloomer Bloopers" (ブルマーを求めて!!); 150. "Ran, Scent of a Woman, Part 1" (蘭は女の香り = その1 =); 151. "Ran, Scent of a Woman, Part 2" (蘭は女の香り = その2 =); 152. "The Arduous Path to Womanhood" (努力、女の道!!); 153. "Proof of Womanhood" (女の証明！); 154. "Art Is a Sport!" (絵画はスポーツだ！); 155. "The Female Groom" (花婿、それは女!!); 156. "Ataru Becomes a Woman" (あたる、女へ!!); 157. "Sex-Change Shenanigans" (性転のヘキレキ!!)
16	June 15, 1983	4-09-120746-4
158. "Late Autumn... and Matsutake" (晩秋...そしてまつたけ!!); 159. "Haunted Bottle" (妖怪徳利!!); 160. "My Mom the Firefighter, Part 1" (母子断絶火事模様!! = その1 =); 161. "My Mom the Firefighter, Part 2" (母子断絶火事模様!! = その2 =); 162. "L♥ve—Darling in Danger" (愛●ダーリンの危機!!); 163. "The Wild Christmas Tree Party!" (クリスマスツリーわいわいパーティー!!); 164. "Slumbering Family Heirloom" (家宝は寝て待て!!); 165. "Ryunosuke's Quality Family Time" (竜之介一家団らん!!); 166. "Lum's Wrath" (怒りのラムちゃん!!); 167. "So Long, Hot Spring's Emblem" (さらば温泉マーク!!); 168. "It's Our Setsubun Festival Feud!" (うちらの節分ケンカ祭りだっちゃ!!)
17	October 15, 1983	4-09-120747-2
169. "A Valentine's of Father-Daughter Love!" (父と娘（こ）の愛のバレンタイン!!); 170. "Deadly Fighter Snapping Turtle Ten" (必殺ケンカ少年・すっぽんのテン!!); 171. "Anko Pathos, the Taste of Love?!" (あんこ悲しや、恋の味!?); 172. "Indelible Lipstick Magic" (き・え・な・いルージュマジック!!); 173. "Buried Classroom" (埋没教室!!); 174. "Beautiful Sakura's Exorcisms" (艶姿桜御祓!!); 175. "Flower Viewing Death Match!" (花見デスマッチ!!); 176. "Trickle of Memories" (想い出ボロボロ!?); 177. "Album of Memories" (想い出のアルバム); 178. "Wretched Shutaro" (みじめっ子・終太郎!!); 179. "Frenzied Shutaro" (逆上、終太郎!!)
18	January 15, 1984	4-09-120748-0
180. "Cosmo Teach CAO-2" (惑星教師（コスモティーチャー）CAO-2); 181. "Mysterious Ego Death Potion" (無我の妙薬!!); 182. "Ton's Elopement" (トンちゃんの駆け落ち！); 183. "A Night Alone" (夜を二人で!!); 184. "A Chest Full of Longing, Part 1" (あこがれを胸に!! = その1 =); 185. "A Chest Full of Longing, Part 2" (あこがれを胸に!! = その2 =); 186. "Miss Tomobiki Contest: Preliminary Round" (ミス友引コンテスト；予備選); 187. "Miss Tomobiki Contest: Main Round" (ミス友引コンテスト；本選); 188. "Miss Tomobiki Contest: Swimsuit Competition" (ミス友引コンテスト；水着審査); 189. "Miss Tomobiki Contest: Battle of the Women" (ミス友引コンテスト；戦う女たち); 190. "Miss Tomobiki Contest: Results" (ミス友引コンテスト；結果発表)
19	April 15, 1984	4-09-120749-9
191. "Underwater Love Triangle!!" (水中ラブ三角形（トライアングル）!!); 192. "Ten Floats in Space?!" (テンちゃん宙に浮く!?); 193. "Mother on the Rocks – Part 1" (岩石の母；前編); 194. "Mother on the Rocks – Part 2" (岩石の母；後編); 195. "Little Canned Youth" (缶につめた小さな青春); 196. "Oh, Night Shops!" (ああ夜店); 197. "I am a F-I-S-H" (わたしはサ・カ・ナ); 198. "Sakura's Sorrowful Childhood" (哀愁の幼年期・サクラ); 199. "Recovering That Which Was Lost" (失われたモノを求めて；前編); 200. "Recovering That Which Was Lost—Fierce 3-on-3 Battle" (失われたモノを求めて；激闘3vs3); 201. "Recovering That Which Was Lost—Conclusion" (失われたモノを求めて；後編)
20	June 15, 1984	4-09-120750-2
202. "Love Letter Trouble—Part 1" (トLOVEル・レター；前編); 203. "Love Letter Trouble—Part 2" (トLOVEル・レター；後編); 204. "The Way of Love" (愛の行方); 205. "The Splendid Dance of Falling Leaves" (華麗なる落葉の舞い); 206. "Love Knows No Barriers" (愛は国境を越えて); 207. "Lover Thief—Part 1" (恋人泥棒；前編); 208. "Lover Thief—Part 2" (恋人泥棒；後編); 209. "When Loves Stikes" (愛がふれあうとき); 210. "Youth Rugby Hell" (青春ラグビー地獄); 211. "The Flying Girl" (空を飛ぶ童女); 212. "Magic Realm! Jungle Terror" (魔境！ 戦慄の密林（ジャングル）)
21	September 15, 1984	4-09-121171-2
213. "Secret Spot! Palatial Cake of Horrors" (密室！ ケーキ屋敷の恐怖); 214. "Get in Shape with Hanetsuki" (シェイプアップ・羽根つき); 215. "The Thorny Road of the Performing Arts" (芸道一筋いばら道); 216. "The Glove of Love and Conflict" (愛と闘魂のグローブ); 217. "Blue-White Flames of Anger – Part 1" (蒼白き炎の怒り；前編); 218. "Blue-White Flames of Anger – Part 2" (蒼白き炎の怒り；中編); 219. "Blue-White Flames of Anger – Part 3" (蒼白き炎の怒り；後編); 220. "Transformation Spray" (変身スプレー); 221. "Lum Becomes a Cow" (ラムちゃん、ウシになる); 222. "Foxes in the Moonlight" (月夜のキツネたち); 223. "Relationships by Ryunosuke" (竜之介式男女交際)
22	November 15, 1984	4-09-121172-0
224. "That Mizunokoji Girl – Part 1" (水乃小路家の娘 = その1 =); 225. "That Mizunokoji Girl – Part 2" (水乃小路家の娘 = その2 =); 226. "That Mizunokoji Girl – Part 3" (水乃小路家の娘 = その3 =); 227. "That Mizunokoji Girl – Part 4" (水乃小路家の娘 = その4 =); 228. "A Day in the Life of Kin the Playboy" (遊び人金さん始末記); 229. "Revenge of the Trio!" (逆襲（ギャグシュウ）！ 三人組); 230. "Troubled Youth" (悩み多き青春); 231. "Glittering, Dazzling Defender of Justice" (豪華絢爛正義の味方); 232. "Ooh, Scary! Voodoo Doll" (あな恐ろしや、ワラ人形); 233. "The Secret Flower Garden" (秘密の花園); 234. "Ten's Son" (テンちゃんの息子)
23	January 15, 1985	4-09-121173-9
235. "A Valiant Duel – Part 1" (勇気ある決闘；前編); 236. "A Valiant Duel – Part 2" (勇気ある決闘；後編); 237. "Asuka Returns – Part 1" (飛鳥ふたたび = その1 =); 238. "Asuka Returns – Part 2" (飛鳥ふたたび = その2 =); 239. "Asuka Returns – Part 3" (飛鳥ふたたび = その3 =); 240. "Lethal Attack: Yaminabe!" (必殺！ ヤミナベ); 241. "Ice Cooler Relaxation" (アイスクーラー・リラックス); 242. "The Obstacle Swim Meet – Part 1" (ザ・障害物水泳大会；前編); 243. "The Obstacle Swim Meet – Part 2" (ザ・障害物水泳大会；後編); 244. "Battle: A Mendo Family Fireworks Event" (合戦！ 面堂家花火大会); 245. "The Golden Age of the Beach Cafe" (浜茶屋繁盛記)
24	February 15, 1985	4-09-121174-7
246. "Crooked Commerce" (非道なる商売人); 247. "Last Date" (最後のデート); 248. "The Great Escape and Hullabaloo" (大脱走・大騒動); 249. "Delinquent Girls: Operation Seduction" (スケ番グループ色気大作戦); 250. "Kotatsu Love" (コタツにかけた愛); 251. "Vestiges of a Wife" (妻は面影の中に); 252. "A Stormy Date – Part 1" (嵐を呼ぶデート = その1 =); 253. "A Stormy Date – Part 2" (嵐を呼ぶデート = その2 =); 254. "A Stormy Date – Part 3" (嵐を呼ぶデート = その3 =); 255. "A Stormy Date – Part 4" (嵐を呼ぶデート = その4 =); 256. "A Stormy Date – Part 5" (嵐を呼ぶデート = その5 =)
25	April 15, 1985	4-09-121175-5
257. "May We Meet in Our Dreams – Reality" (夢で逢えたら；現実編); 258. "May We Meet in Our Dreams – The Showdown" (夢で逢えたら；大決戦); 259. "The Shape of Tenacity" (執念の形); 260. "Love Hidden in the O-Den" (オデンに秘めた恋); 261. "The Tragic Twilight Hour of Autumn Potatoes" (更け行く秋のイモの悲しき); 262. "In Case of a Cold" (風邪ひかば); 263. "Mochi Mayhem – Sculpt the Principal" (モチ争奪校長胸像杯); 264. "Ringing in the New Year" (歳末（とき）は鐘鳴り); 265. "Chomp-Chomp, Everybody!" (かむかむエブリボデェ); 266. "Heartbreak Crossin' – Part 1" (ハートブレイクCrossin'；前編); 267. "Heartbreak Crossin' – Conclusion" (ハートブレイクCrossin'；後編)
26	July 15, 1985	4-09-121176-3
268. "The Setsubun Bean Crisis" (節分危機一豆); 269. "Woman vs. Woman Showdown – Part 1" (決闘！ 女vs.女；前編); 270. "Woman vs. Woman Showdown – Part 2" (決闘！ 女vs.女；中編); 271. "Woman vs. Woman Showdown – Part 3" (決闘！ 女vs.女；後編); 272. "Big Bottle, Little Bottle" (大ビン小ビン); 273. "House Call" (風邪見舞い); 274. "Haunted Mendo" (あやかしの面堂); 275. "Fantasy Bubble Gum" (妄想フーセンガム); 276. "Alien Invaders" (宇宙からの侵略者); 277. "Love's Servant" (愛の使者（キューピッド）どすえ); 278. "Exorcism Three-Way" (お祓い三すくみ)
27	October 15, 1985	4-09-121177-1
279. "Fox Takes a Bride" (キツネの嫁取り); 280. "Planet Strongfood" (強食惑星); 281. "A Problematic Blue Bird of Happiness" (かってな幸福、青い鳥); 282. "Mother's Heart, Child's Heart" (母の心、子の心); 283. "Fly Away, Shoulder Pain!" (飛んでけ！ 肩こり); 284. "Delinquent Girls—Operation Animals" (スケ番三人娘、動物作戦); 285. "Pick Your Fish" (活魚つかみどり); 286. "Ten-Year Truth" (十年目の真実); 287. "Picking Hangya" (はんぎゃ摘み); 288. "Swimsuit Rhapsody" (水着ラプソディー); 289. "The Zen Club" (反省座禅会)
28	January 15, 1986	4-09-121178-X
290. "Wish Upon a Star" (星に願いを); 291. "Special Delivery Kiss ♥" (口づけ●速達小包); 292. "Siblings ★ Battle of Love—Part 1" (兄妹★愛の闘い；前編); 293. "Siblings ★ Battle of Love—Part 2" (兄妹★愛の闘い；後編); 294. "Pool of Rage" (怒りのプール); 295. "Slippery Soap" (つるつるソープ); 296. "Beach Cafe Summer" (浜茶屋の夏); 297. "Toll of the Wind Chimes" (風鈴樹の音色); 298. "The Home Visit Blues" (涙の家庭訪問); 299. "The Haunted Parasol" (妖精のパラソル); 300. "The Girl in the Photograph" (写真の中の女)
29	April 15, 1986	4-09-121179-8
301. "Electric Jungle—Part 1" (電飾の魔境 = その1 =); 302. "Electric Jungle—Part 2" (電飾の魔境 = その2 =); 303. "Electric Jungle—Part 3" (電飾の魔境 = その3 =); 304. "Electric Jungle—Part 4" (電飾の魔境 = その4 =); 305. "Magical Hat" (マジカルハット); 306. "Red Shoes of Passion" (情熱の赤い靴); 307. "Reach for the Stars, Prima Ballerina!" (プリマの星をつかめ); 308. "The Secret Past of the Cosmic Box" (箱宇宙(こすもぼっくす)に秘められた過去); 309. "Electric Secret Agent—Part 1" (電気仕掛けの御庭番 前編); 310. "Electric Secret Agent—Part 2" (電気仕掛けの御庭番 後編); 311. "The Case of the Battered Principal" (校長殴打事件)
30	July 15, 1986	4-09-121180-1
312. "The Runaway Turkey" (七面鳥逃げた); 313. "I Know Your Secret" (おまえのひみつをしっている); 314. "A Mature Love Story—Part 1" (おとなの恋の物語 前編); 315. "A Mature Love Story—Part 2" (おとなの恋の物語 後編); 316. "Scary Manju" (饅頭こわい); 317. "Raging Sky Battle" (怒りの空中戦); 318. "The Legend of the Snow Cone" (カマクラ伝説); 319. "Date With a Spirit" (霊魂とデート); 320. "Ultra-Colorful Couple's Look" (極彩のペアルック); 321. "Invitation to Another Realm" (別世界への招待); 322. "Darling's True Feelings" (ダーリンへの本音)
31	September 15, 1986	4-09-121501-7
323. "Falling Headfirst in Love—Part 1" (愛の脳天逆落とし 前編); 324. "Falling Headfirst in Love—Part 2" (愛の脳天逆落とし 後編); 325. "Sakura Mochi Over Flowers" (花より桜もち); 326. "Mr. Mole Finds a Bride" (モグラの嫁とり); 327. "The Cursed Egg" (呪われたタマゴ); 328. "Lost Memories" (失われた記憶); 329. "Open the Door" (扉を開けて); 330. "The End of Love and Sadness" (愛と哀しみの果て); 331. "Running for Tomorrow" (明日なき暴走); 332. "Dream Doors" (夢の扉); 333. "Once More for Tomorrow" (明日へもういっちょ)
32	November 15, 1986	4-09-121502-5
334. "Mastering the Path of Poverty" (極めよ、貧乏道); 335. "Time Bomb Memories" (思い出は時限爆弾); 336. "The Octopus Flute" (タコを呼ぶ笛); 337. "Fly, Messenger Pigeon of Love!" (飛べ、愛の伝書鳩); 338. "Fortress of Fastidiousness—Part 1" (潔癖の要塞 前編); 339. "Fortress of Fastidiousness—Part 2" (潔癖の要塞 中編); 340. "Fortress of Fastidiousness—Part 3" (潔癖の要塞 後編); 341. "Nagisa's Fiancé—Part 1" (渚のフィアンセ 前編); 342. "Nagisa's Fiancé—Part 2" (渚のフィアンセ 後編); 343. "Revenge of the Morning Glory" (朝顔、怒りの逆襲); 344. "Sherbert Fury" (怒れ、シャーベット)
33	January 15, 1987	4-09-121503-3
345. "The Horse and the Young Lady" (馬と令嬢); 346. "Flower Petals of Love and Courage—Part 1" (愛と勇気の花一輪 前編); 347. "Flower Petals of Love and Courage—Part 2" (愛と勇気の花一輪 中編); 348. "Flower Petals of Love and Courage—Part 3" (愛と勇気の花一輪 後編); 349. "One Night's Battle—Part 1" (一夜の攻防戦 前編); 350. "One Night's Battle—Part 2" (一夜の攻防戦 後編); 351. "Beware the Damsel-Eyed Measels" (乙女バシカの恐怖); 352. "Goat and Cheese" (ヤギさんとチーズ); 353. "Howling at the Moon" (月に吠える); 354. "Steal My Heart" (ハートをつかめ); 355. "The Search for the Secret Hot Spring" (秘湯を求めて)
34	April 15, 1987	4-09-121504-1
356. "Boy Meets Girl, Act 1—Pitch-Black" (ボーイミーツガール ACT.1 まっくろけ); 357. "Boy Meets Girl, Act 2—Will You Marry Me?" (ボーイミーツガール ACT.2 嫁に来ないか); 358. "Boy Meets Girl, Act 3—Farewell Morning" (ボーイミーツガール ACT.3 別れの朝); 359. "Boy Meets Girl, Act 4—Heart Ignition" (ボーイミーツガール ACT.4 ハートのIgnition); 360. "Boy Meets Girl, Act 5—Labyrinth of Reunion" (ボーイミーツガール ACT.5 再会のラビリンス); 361. "Boy Meets Girl, Act 6—Are You Really Getting Married?" (ボーイミーツガール ACT.6 結婚するって本当ですか); 362. "Boy Meets Girl, Act 7—Crooked Heart" (ボーイミーツガール ACT.7 ねじれたハートで); 363. "Boy Meets Girl, Act 8—Disaster" (ボーイミーツガール ACT.8 こまっちゃうな); 364. "Boy Meets Girl, Act 9—Unstoppable" (ボーイミーツガール ACT.9 どうにもとまらない); 365. "Boy Meets Girl, Act 10—I Want You When I Can't Have You" (ボーイミーツガール ACT.10 ないものねだりのI Want You); 366. "Boy Meets Girl, Act 11—FIN" (ボーイミーツガール ACT.11 Fin)

=== Shinsōban edition ===
No.	Original release date	Original ISBN	English release date	English ISBN
1	November 17, 2006	4-0912-0716-2	February 19, 2019	978-1-9747-0342-5
2	November 17, 2006	4-0912-0717-0	February 19, 2019	978-1-9747-0342-5
3	December 16, 2006	4-0912-0718-9	May 21, 2019	978-1-9747-0343-2
4	December 16, 2006	978-4-0912-0719-7	May 21, 2019	978-1-9747-0343-2
5	January 18, 2007	978-4-0912-0720-3	August 20, 2019	978-1-9747-0344-9
6	January 18, 2007	978-4-0912-0738-8	August 20, 2019	978-1-9747-0344-9
7	February 16, 2007	978-4-0912-0739-5	November 19, 2019	978-1-9747-0345-6
8	February 16, 2007	978-4-0912-0740-1	November 19, 2019	978-1-9747-0345-6
9	March 16, 2007	978-4-0912-0756-2	February 18, 2020	978-1-9747-0346-3
10	March 16, 2007	978-4-0912-0757-9	February 18, 2020	978-1-9747-0346-3
11	April 18, 2007	978-4-0912-0758-6	May 19, 2020	978-1-9747-0347-0
12	April 18, 2007	978-4-0912-0759-3	May 19, 2020	978-1-9747-0347-0
13	May 18, 2007	978-4-0912-0760-9	August 18, 2020	978-1-9747-0348-7
14	May 18, 2007	978-4-0912-0769-2	August 18, 2020	978-1-9747-0348-7
15	June 18, 2007	978-4-0912-0770-8	November 17, 2020	978-1-9747-0349-4
16	June 18, 2007	978-4-0912-0773-9	November 17, 2020	978-1-9747-0349-4
17	July 18, 2007	978-4-0912-0774-6	February 16, 2021	978-1-9747-0350-0
18	July 18, 2007	978-4-0912-0775-3	February 16, 2021	978-1-9747-0350-0
19	August 10, 2007	978-4-0912-0776-0	May 18, 2021	978-1-9747-0351-7
20	August 10, 2007	978-4-0912-0777-7	May 18, 2021	978-1-9747-0351-7
21	September 18, 2007	978-4-0912-0778-4	August 17, 2021	978-1-9747-0352-4
22	September 18, 2007	978-4-0912-0779-1	August 17, 2021	978-1-9747-0352-4
23	October 18, 2007	978-4-0912-0780-7	November 16, 2021	978-1-9747-0353-1
24	October 18, 2007	978-4-0912-0784-5	November 16, 2021	978-1-9747-0353-1
25	November 16, 2007	978-4-0912-0785-2	February 15, 2022	978-1-9747-0354-8
26	November 16, 2007	978-4-0912-0786-9	February 15, 2022	978-1-9747-0354-8
27	December 15, 2007	978-4-0912-0787-6	May 24, 2022	978-1-9747-0355-5
28	December 15, 2007	978-4-0912-0788-3	May 24, 2022	978-1-9747-0355-5
29	January 18, 2008	978-4-0912-0789-0	August 23, 2022	978-1-9747-0356-2
30	January 18, 2008	978-4-0912-0790-6	August 23, 2022	978-1-9747-0356-2
31	February 18, 2008	978-4-0912-0798-2	November 22, 2022	978-1-9747-0357-9
32	February 18, 2008	978-4-0912-0799-9	November 22, 2022	978-1-9747-0357-9
33	March 18, 2008	978-4-0912-0800-2	February 28, 2023	978-1-9747-0358-6
34	March 18, 2008	978-4-0912-0807-1	February 28, 2023	978-1-9747-0358-6
