= Basara (manga) =

Japanese fantasy manga series by Yumi Tamura

- The Japanese cover of the first manga volume

バサラ
- Genre: Drama, fantasy
- Manga
- Written by: Yumi Tamura
- Published by: Shogakukan
- English publisher: NA: Viz Media
- Imprint: Flower Comics
- Magazine: Bessatsu Shōjo Comic
- Original run: September 1990 – June 1998
- Volumes: 27
- Anime television series

Legend of Basara
- Directed by: Noburu Takamoto
- Produced by: Takao Asaga; Takashi Terasaki
- Written by: Takao Koyama; Yoshimichi Hosoi; Masashi Kubota
- Music by: Fumitaka Anzai; Toshiyuki Omori
- Original network: Sun Television
- Original run: April 2, 1998 – June 25, 1998
- Episodes: 13

Basara (Japanese: バサラ) is a Japanese fantasy manga series written and illustrated by Yumi Tamura. The story takes place in a future Japan, reduced to a barren desert by a catastrophe at the end of the 20th century. The main character is Sarasa, a girl whose twin brother, Tatara, is prophesied to be the "child of destiny" (運命の子供 or 運命の少年) who will bring back the country's independence and stop the tyrannical rule of the Empire, namely the Red King. When Tatara is killed, Sarasa pretends to be him in order to keep the downtrodden from losing hope.

The manga was serialized in Shogakukan's Bessatsu Shōjo Comic magazine from September 1990 to June 1998. Shogakukan collected the individual chapters into 27 bound volumes under the Flower Comics imprint from March 1991 to March 2000. The manga won the 38th Shogakukan Manga Award in the shōjo (girls) category in 1993. Viz Media licensed the manga for an English-language release in North America; they published 27 volumes from August 2003 to May 2008.

Basara was adapted into a 13-episode anime television series titled Legend of Basara (レジェンド・オブ・バサラ), which aired in Japan from April to June 1998. It was produced by KSS and directed by Noburu Takamoto.

The manga was also adapted into several stage plays in Japan, the first of which premiered in 2012. A filmed performance was released on DVD in July 2013. The second stage play was performed at Theater 1010 in Tokyo from January 9 to January 14, 2014. The third stage play was performed at Kinokuniya Hall in Tokyo from January 25 to January 28, 2019. The fourth stage play was performed at Theater Sun Mall in Tokyo from January 13 to January 24, 2022.

== Overview ==
In Basara's post-apocalyptic setting, Japan has been controlled by a succession of corrupt and oppressive rulers of Saffron Clan. The current one is the Golden Emperor, a sovereign so obsessed with maintaining his power that he has had most of his children killed. He later appointed territories to the remaining children, allowing them to rule as subordinate kings and expend their energies in rivalries among each other, instead of trying to dethrone him. As a result, most of the Kings neglect the people they rule.

Though the peasants have been downtrodden for decades, they have not completely lost their rebellious spirit. Four swords named for the gods of the Four Symbols—Byakko, Suzaku, Seiryū and Genbu—forged for fallen rebel leaders two generations past, are the symbols of underground resistance groups across Japan. The sword of Byakko is kept in Byakko Village, and according to a prophet, a child of fate who will lead a revolution will be born there. When twins are born—a girl and a boy—the prophet says that one of them is the child of destiny. Villagers believe the boy, Tatara, is the child of destiny, but ultimately the girl, Sarasa, is the leader. When the local ruler, the Red King, destroys her village and has her brother beheaded, she assumes his name and duty to lead her people in rebellion.

Sarasa undergoes psychological strain over having to pretend to be a boy. As such, she often visits hot springs to "let her hair down." During these visits, she runs into a mysterious young man named Shuri, and they fall in love with each other.

Unknown to Sarasa, Shuri is really the Red King, upon whom she has sworn revenge for destroying her village and killing her family. The Red King is likewise unaware that Sarasa, in her alter ego, is the rebel leader he is trying to kill. As the story progresses, the pair's relationship deepens even as their struggle becomes more bloody.

== Characters ==
=== Main characters ===
Sarasa (更紗)

Voiced by: Akiko Kimura
The protagonist, a 15-year-old girl who takes the name of her murdered twin brother Tatara, who was known as the child of fate. As Tatara, she wields the sword of Byakko and leads the survivors of Byakko Village. Even among her allies few people know she is a girl.
Sarasa hopes to create a land that is fertile, full of flora, and free of strife. Though she is quick to cry and psychologically weak in some respects, over the course of the story she develops undeniable skills in leadership and swordplay, and becomes the central figure of the Tatara Army.
Byakko sword: One of the four swords descended from the Basarano rebels. It was Genshou, Tatara's and Sarasa's great-grandfather's, weapon.
The name Sarasa refers to calico cloth.
Shinbashi (新橋/シンバシ)
Sarasa's pet owl, the runt of his hatching. Sarasa is unwilling to let the other chicks crowd him out, and decides to take care of him.
The Red King, Shuri (赤の王 (朱理))
Voiced by: Kazuhiko Inoue
The 17-year-old youngest son of the Emperor, he rules over Saikoku (western Japan) which includes Chugoku, Shikoku and Kyūshū. In the early parts of the story Shuri stands out as brutally cruel to those who do not obey him, because he is responsible for the destruction of Byakko Village and the murder of Tatara. Later he meets Sarasa, unaware that they are enemies, and falls in love with her.
Though he is merciless to his enemies, Shuri is a capable ruler and very proud of his realm. He is big-hearted, with a free-spirited personality and is generally quite personable, though he tends to be overly competitive. Shuri is an expert swordsman.

=== Byakko Village ===
==== The Deceased ====
Tatara (タタラ)
Voiced by: Akira Ishida
Sarasa's twin brother, raised as the child of fate in order to protect Sarasa. Respected by everyone in Byakko Village, Tatara is very responsible, and very close to his sister. He is killed by General Kazan, one of the Red King's subordinates.
The name Tatara refers to bellows, as used to smelt metal. It is also the Japanese name of Bond, a Mansion under the White Tiger (Byakko).
Makoto (Maa-kun) (マコト (まーくん))
Sarasa's childhood friend, who died in Tatara's place at about 8 years of age.

==== The Revival ====
Nagi (ナギ)
Voiced by: Hayami Sho
The blind prophet who foretold the coming of the child of fate, Nagi was also the physician and schoolteacher of Byakko Village. He serves as a mentor to Sarasa, who trusts him completely. Nagi learned medicine from the great doctor Bashō.
Kakuji (角じい)
Voiced by: Tesshō Genda
A Byakko villager; he instructs Tatara, and later Sarasa, in swordplay. He plays a surrogate father role for Sarasa, and she places a great deal of trust in him.
Kakujii originally came from a fishing village in the Tohoku region, but was thrown into Abashiri Prison after rebelling against the Black King, who rules there. He later escaped, and eventually ended up in Byakko Village.

=== Butterfly Circus ===
Ageha (揚羽)
Voiced by: Kaneto Shiozawa
A former slave and survivor of the Blue Nobles, a nomadic people all but wiped out by the government. Ageha saved Sarasa from the Red King when she was younger, but he lost his left eye in the bargain. He has friends all across Japan and is capable of calling in tremendous favors from them.
Ageha usually tours with Madam Butterfly's troupe of traveling performers under the name Kicho, the star dancer. He keeps an owl, Kagero, who is a parent of Sarasa's owl, Shinbashi. Since he was a young man he has been looking for a woman to die for. He eventually finds that in Sarasa.
'Ageha' refers to the swallowtail butterfly, and Kicho comes from the personal name of Oda Nobunaga's wife Nohime.
Madame Butterfly
the mistress of the Butterfly Circus.

Aro
the former female fellow of Ageha in the past, she had slept with Ageha. She died in a razzia led by Shido.

=== Suzaku Tribe ===
Hayato (ハヤト)
Voiced by: Hiro Yuki
A boy from the city of Dazaifu in Kyūshū, Hayato becomes one of Tatara's first allies. He is the successor to the wielder of the Suzaku sword, but specializes in the use of bow and arrows. His great grandfather with his 3 friends were the heroes revolted against the cruel king Shishiō but failed. Hayato is scatterbrained, but because he gets the others out of many dangerous situations, he becomes a sort of mascot figure for the Tatara Army.
The Suzaku tribe
the tribe under the lead of the wielder of the Suzaku sword.

The Shōjō clan
the traitors of the Suzaku, they took over the Suzaku battleship by creating a fake Suzaku sword to fool others.
Suzaku sword: One of the four swords descended from the Basarano rebels. It was Rashou's, Hayato's grandfather's, weapon.

=== Chacha's Pirate Ship ===
Chacha (茶々)
Voiced by: Kaori Yamagata
The fierce and beautiful leader of a group of pirates who capture Sarasa and Hayato, intending to sell them to foreigners. However, Sarasa's daring impresses Chacha, and she decides to become Sarasa's ally instead. Chacha has a sisterly nature and likes to have others depend on her. Her lover is her right-hand man, Zaki.
Chacha is named after the childhood name of Yodo-Dono, a concubine of Toyotomi Hideyoshi.
Zaki (座木)
Voiced by: Koji Ishii
Cha Cha's first mate and lover; a man of few words. While even more deadly in battle that she, Zaki admires Cha Cha's indomitable spirit and supports her in any way he can. His loyalty is to Cha Cha above all, and he would trade even Tatara's life for Cha Cha's.

=== Suō Castle ===
Shidō (四道)
Voiced by: Jurota Kosugi
The governor of Dazaifu and commander of the Kyūshū division of the Red Army, Shidou is the Red King's cousin and closest confidant. He is the commander of the two powerful war-units of Red Army: the navy unit Fuujin (Kazekami, Wind God) and the infantry Raijin (Thunder God). While generally warm and genial, Shidou does not flinch from the grislier duties of leadership – he is a calculating and ruthless general who is said to leave mountains of corpses behind him on the battlefield.
Shidō is the first character to realize the full implications of Sarasa and Shuri's relationship, but he is killed before he can speak of it.
Senju (千手)
Shidō's fiancee, a young noblewoman. Senju is made of sterner stuff than her delicate looks would suggest. She truly loves Shidou even though their marriage was arranged, and they have a rush wedding before Shidou goes into battle with Tatara at her urging.
Senju's name is derived from a title for the bodhisattva Kanon, meaning 'One Thousand Hands'.

=== Seiran Castle ===
Asagi (浅葱)
Voiced by: Nozomu Sasaki
The captain of the Blue King's special guards, "Gunjou", which is made up of handsome boys. Asagi is actually a secret child of the Emperor and his daughter Ginko and is the true Blue King. Asagi infiltrates Tatara's army on the orders of the White King, plotting to play Tatara and the Red King against each other.
Asagi has a contrary and self-centered personality, and he hates physical labor. Though he is very skilled with a sword he is physically weak. He eventually grows fond of Tatara's Army, despite his best efforts. He forms a crush on Sasara, and in the end shows his loyalty to her.
Snake King
the false Blue King.

Raizō (雷蔵)
A subordinate of the false Blue King, known as the "Count". He is actually the leader of the rebellion in Seiran, and inheritor of the sword of Seiryū. Raizō is a friend of Ageha, and he secretly rescues participants of the Suzuka Murder Race.
Raizou is married to Izumi, a mute former slave of the false Blue King, and over the course of the story, they have a child, Raita.
Seiryū sword
One of the four swords descended from the Basarano rebels. It was Tenmanya Nabezou's weapon.

=== Kumano Region ===
Nachi (那智)
The son and heir of the head priest of the Kumano Shinto shrine. Nachi runs across Sarasa while hunting the largest whale in the seas in his region. Nachi is a merchant with a bold, optimistic personality, and he speaks with a strong regional accent.
Nachi is a member of the Tengu youth organization with his friend Hijiri, and serves as second in command. He is knowledgeable about survival skills, and comes to Sarasa's aid numerous times.
Nachi is named after the eponymous Nachi region, part of present-day Wakayama prefecture.
Hijiri (聖)
The leader of the Tengu youth organization in Kumano; like Nachi, he is the son of a local Kumano leader. Hijiri's personality is opposite to Nachi's – he is calm and quick-thinking, and a master of Iaidō. He is strict with Sarasa, but well-meaning.
Hijiri has been the closest of friends with Nachi since they both were young, and is often worried by Nachi's recklessness.

=== Okinawa Isle ===
Bashō (芭蕉)
A physician who travels all over Japan with his assistant Yūna, using Okinawa as his home base. He is Nagi's surrogate parent and mentor.
Both Sarasa and Shuri go to Okinawa seeking treatment from Bashō, and he later joins Nagi as a medic for the Tatara Army.
Nakijin (今帰仁)
A karate master who is kind, serious and reliable. He nurses Sarasa for a time while she is recovering from eye injuries. Despite his initial dislike of Shuri, they reach and understanding as they defend Okinawa's independence and eventually develop an unbreakable friendship.
Nakijin's name is derived from Nakijin gusuku and the likewise-named region of Okinawa.
Yūna (ユウナ)
Bashō-sensei's assistant whom Shuri meets in Okinawa. She is bold and tomboyish but likes to be relied upon, and treats Shuri like a younger brother. She is a childhood friend of Nakijin, and also capable in karate. Yūna is engaged to the President of Okinawa, Asato, who is also her surrogate father.
Yūna's name comes from the Okinawan name of Hibiscus tiliaceus, a tropical plant.

=== Tōhoku Region ===
==== Kazuno ====
Masunaga (増長)
Representative of the Kazuno resistance who assists Sarasa in a rescue mission to the dreaded Abashiri prison, and later allies with Tatara's army. A long-time friend of Tamon.
Masunaga's name is derived from one of the Buddhist Heavenly Kings, Virūḍhaka, patron of growth.
Tamon (Monta) (多聞)
One of the four generals of Kazuno, he is an eccentric who speaks with a distinctive northern accent. Unselfish and aloof from the world, he loves fishing and travels the land in search of good fishing spots. Sarasa finds him in the most inhospitable part of the Abashiri prison, where he is the only survivor. He holds the sword of Genbu.
Tamon is named after another of the Four Heavenly Kings, Vaisravana, whose Japanese name means all-hearing.
Genbu sword
One of the four swords descended from the Basarano rebels. It was Akihiko's weapon.

==== Hokkaidō – Abashiri Jail ====
The land entrusts the emperor's brother.

Kaze no Fukuro (Wind Owl)
Prince of Hokkaido. He is the son of the emperor's brother, also a cousin of Shuri. His face resembles Shuri.
Mizu no Shika (Water Deer)
Close friend of Kaze no Fukuro.
Hi no Kitsune (Fire Fox)

- Karon: Hi no Kitsune's guard

Tsuchi no Kuma (Earth Bear)
He was in the same jail as Kakujii. When Kakujii planned to escape, no one followed him, then the prison's guard punished his fellow inmates.
Prisoners

- Shirasu: The perverted prisoner who leads the prisoners at Jail A, guarded by Mizu no Shika. He and his companies threaten Sarasa by noticing her feminine smell. To protect her, Ageha sacrifices his body to Shirasu.

=== Capital Kyōto ===
Ginko (銀子)
The White King, who is actually female. She was married off to the leader of Awaji Island in an arranged marriage, but she ended up falling in love with him. When the Emperor ordered the attack on Awajishima, she got trapped under the burning building, losing the function of both of her legs. She was 'appeased' with the title of 'White King', but although she is the eldest child, her name is listed after the Black King's in the order of ranking.
Hiragi (Kakihito) (柊(柿人))
Kakihito attacked Awaji Island, killing Ginko's husband, as leader of the Oka, a group of young men from Kyoto who serve as the vanguard of the army. He saved Ginko from the burning debris, getting severely burned in the process. He then gave up serving on the front lines of the army, retiring to be the 'shadow of the White King'.

==== Four Nobles of Blue King ====
In the English version, they are called "The Four Virtues." They appear to work for Asagi, the true Blue King, but it is revealed later they belong to the White King. Each has a plant as part of their name (Kiku = chrysanthemum, Ume = plum, Ran = lily, -take = bamboo).

Kikune (菊音)
The junior member of the White King's secret unit, the Four Nobles, which is tasked with guarding Asagi. Despite the feminine appearance of all the Four Nobles members, Kikune is the only female among them. She has a cheerful, open personality and is an aspiring inventor. Kikune is employed by the Black King's wife under the name Kasane and befriends Sarasa, even though they are enemies. She is also skilled at making mechanical contraptions.
Muratake (群竹)
The senior member of the Four Nobles. He is calm, collected, and very duty-bound but seems somewhat absent-minded. Unlike the other members of the group, his loyalties lie with Asagi over the White King. He has skill with medicine.
Ranmaru
Umewaka

==== Four Elders of the Capital ====
Hagiwara of the South
Momonoi of the North

- Hozomi: son of Momonoi. Lives at Suo and is famous for his paintings.
- Renko: lover of Hozomi. A reporter, friend of Taro.

Tachibana of the West
Sakurada of the East

==== Yarogumi ====
The guardians of the capital. Their leader is Hachiya.

Hachiya

=== Shikoku Castle ===
Murasaki no Ue (紫の上)
The wife of the Black King, beloved by the people.
Black King
Eldest son of the emperor Ukon.
Hida no Ichimatsu (飛騨の市松)
The Black Army's three-horned admiral, devoted to Murasaki no Ue. He proposes to Kikune at the near end of the Manga.

=== Others ===
Tarō-chan (太郎ちゃん)
A close friend of Ageha who directs a nationwide newspaper network. He dreams of writing Ageha and Tatara's respective biographies.
The old man
Taro's adopted father when he investigates the plan "Pomegranatte" of Hagiwara.

== World: Important Places ==
Set in a post-apocalyptic world, Japan is under the tyrannical rule of a monarchy. The Golden Emperor has divided Japan into several provinces, entrusting the rule of these provinces to his offspring, consisting of the Black, White, Blue and Red Kings.

- Kazuno (鹿角) – The northernmost part of Honshū, which has been fighting against the Black Army for independence. Kazuno is protected by four generals, Tamon to the north, Masunaga to the south, Hirome to the west and Mochikuni to the east.
- Motokuro no Ryōdo (もと黒の領土) – the realm of the Black King
  - Shikoku (紫黒) is Motokuro no Ryōdo's capital and lies in the northeast. The Black King and his mistress Mogami no Kata live here in Kotsuki castle.
  - Tenkyōko is a lake where the Black King has a second castle called the Dove Pavilion. This is where Shuri traps the Black King and his mistress, Mogami no Kata.
- Kantō (関東) – the realm of the Blue King
  - Seiran (青藍) is the capital of Kantou, where the Blue King (the Snake King) resides. There are ruins of the high-rise buildings, maybe the ruined Tokyo after the apocalypse.
- Kyōto (京都) – the capital of Japan, where the Emperor resides in Ukon Palace. Kyouto was the site of construction for a large-scale gold Buddha, which required the labour of many slaves which were taken by the Emperor from his son's realms. Protected by four elders, Momonoi to the north, Sakurada to the east, Tachibana to the west, Hagiwara to the south. These four names correspond to the Japanese names of certain botanica.
- Ōsaka (大阪) – A nearly autonomous merchant town.
- Kii and Kumano (紀伊 熊野) – lies south of Kyoto and is considered a holy land, it is a site for religious pilgrimage.
- Sanyō and Sanin (山陽 山陰) – a desert land, the realm of the Red King
  - Suō (蘇芳) – The Red King's capital, known as 'The Ruby of the Desert' which prospers until a military coup sends the Red King into exile.
  - Byakko no Mura (白虎の村) – Byakko village, where Tatara and Sarasa were born. The village was razed by the Red King and no longer exists.
  - Shikoku (四国) – One of the provinces entrusted to the Red King, it is divided into four nations
  - Kyūshū (九州) – entrusted to the Red King, Dazaifu is its capital, and Sakura-jima (Tatara's base) is in the southern part of this province
- Hokkaidō (北海道) – The northernmost part of Japan, this is where Abashiri prison is. Hokkaido is entrusted to the Emperor's brother.
- Okinawa (沖縄) – An island to the south that has declared its independence from Japan, it has a democratic government.
- Europe – it is known that the European civilization survives and rebuilds itself to the 19th or early 20th century level, with steam warships and rifled artillery. The Europeans government(s) threat the Japan as the barbaric nation, and retaliated with force against any hostile actions of Japanese.

== Basara no Gaiden – Basara's Sidestories ==
Basara also has a large collection of side stories (thirteen chapters). There are stories about the world of Basara before and after the events of the main storyline, and the others are about the lives of the other sub-characters such as Hijiri, Nachi, Masunaga, and Tamon.

=== Katana ===
The story is about the Basarano's Revolution and the four swords of royal clan. The heroine is Tara, fights along with her rescuers from the punishment, against the royal clan led by king Shishioh (Shishioh means "Lion King"). Tara's partners are the first wielders of the four swords: Rashou wields the Suzaku, Tenman'ya Nabezou wields the Seiryuu, Asahiko wields the Genbu (true sword, not a bamboo sword) and Genshou wields the Byakko. Tamura said that she hoped to tell a story about some of the characters' great-grandparents. Genshou is Sarasa's great-grandfather; Rashou is Hayato's. Tara is Shuri's great-grandmother, as at the end of the story, she is captured by the Emperor and marries him, with the intent that if she is truly cursed, her hope is that it will be passed onto the royal family.

The Four Swords' Tale

The Four Swords are the Byakko (White Tiger) of Sarasa, the Suzaku (Crimson Firebird) of Hayato, the Seiryū (Azure Dragon) of Raizō and the Genbu (Black Tortoise) of Tamon. Legends say that if the 4 swords of the heroes from the past are reunited, the new era will come.

=== Wakaba ===
The story is about Japan after Tatara's successful revolution. In this side story, Hayato, using the false name "Shun", is the main role. There are also new characters such as Sarasa and Shuri's children, Ayumu and Hikaru, the mature Raita, son of Raizou and the mature Motomichi, son of Shidou.

== Anime ==
A 13-episode anime adaptation, titled Legend of Basara (レジェンド・オブ・バサラ), aired in Japan from April 2 to June 8, 1998. It was produced by KSS and directed by Norihiro Takamoto. While generally very faithful to the manga, some material from further into the story was cut, such as Senju's assassination attempt and the Suzuno Murder Race episode. The anime roughly covers volumes 1–5 of the manga. The anime was released on home video in Japan, first on VHS and later on DVD. The opening theme is "Endless Loop" by Rouage.

No.	Title	Original release date
1	"Boy of Destiny"; Transliteration: "Unmei no Shounen" (Japanese: 運命の少年)	April 2, 1998
2	"Arch-enemy! The Red King"; Transliteration: "Shukuteki! Aka no Ou" (Japanese: 宿敵！赤の王)	April 9, 1998
3	"Attack"; Transliteration: "Shuugeki" (Japanese: 襲撃)	April 16, 1998
4	"Darkness of the Ordeal"; Transliteration: "Shiren no Yami" (Japanese: 試練の闇)	April 23, 1998
5	"Suzuku's Rashou"; Transliteration: "Suzaku no Rashou" (Japanese: 朱雀の羅生)	April 30, 1998
6	"Flame of the Lotus"; Transliteration: "Kuren no Honou" (Japanese: 红蓮の炎)	May 7, 1998
7	"Dance of Death"; Transliteration: "Shi no Odori" (Japanese: 死の踊り)	May 14, 1998
8	"New Bonds"; Transliteration: "Aratana Kizuna" (Japanese: 新たな絆)	May 21, 1998
9	"The Country's Mahoroba"; Transliteration: "Kuni no Mahoroba" (Japanese: 国のまぼろば)	May 28, 1998
10	"Eruption of Sakura Jima"; Transliteration: "Sakura Jima Fun Ga" (Japanese: 桜嶋噴火)	June 4, 1998
11	"Trapped"; Transliteration: "Shidou Shisu" (Japanese: 四道死す)	June 11, 1998
12	"Light Blue Amid the Blue/The Pale Blue of Ultramarine"; Transliteration: "Kunjou no Asagi" (Japanese: 群青浅葱)	June 18, 1998
13	"Reunion, and Then..."; Transliteration: "Saikai, Soshite" (Japanese: 再会、そして)	June 25, 1998
