= Chicago (manga) =

Japanese manga series by Yumi Tamura

- Japanese cover of the first volume of Chicago, published by Shogakukan

シカゴ (Shikago)
- Genre: Psychological drama; Science fiction
- Manga
- Written by: Yumi Tamura
- Published by: Shogakukan
- English publisher: NA: Viz Media
- Imprint: Flower Comics
- Magazine: Bessatsu Shōjo Comic
- English magazine: NA: Animerica Extra
- Original run: October 13, 2000 – April 13, 2001
- Volumes: 2

Chicago (Japanese: シカゴ, Hepburn: Shikago) is a Japanese near-future action manga series written and illustrated by Yumi Tamura. It was serialized in Shogakukan's Bessatsu Shōjo Comic magazine from the November 2000 issue (released in October) to the May 2001 issue (released in April). Shogakukan collected the individual chapters into two bound volumes published under the Flower Comics imprint. Viz Media licensed the manga for an English-language release in North America, first serialized in Animerica Extra magazine and later published in graphic novel format.

== Overview ==
It is the middle of the 21st century, and Tokyo is expanding rapidly, filling the ground of Tokyo Bay with landfills to make room for the growing population. But suddenly, Tokyo suffers its greatest earthquake since the first quarter of the 20th century, and the landfill liquefies, creating untold damage in the newly made urban area. It is there that the members of Self-Defense Force Rescue Squad Four are sent to locate survivors and assist in any way possible. But what they dig up is a plot of murder and destruction—one that wipes out nearly the entire squad and leaves its two surviving members, the fierce tomboy Rei and her cool, handsome partner Uozumi, in a fight for their lives well after the rubble from the quake has been cleaned up. There is only one place where they can find the work that keeps them alive and the support to start uncovering the mystery that killed their squad: the south-Shinjuku bar called Chicago.

=== Rescues Inc. ===
Rescue workers Rei and her handsome partner Uozumi are looking for survivors after Tokyo's worst earthquake of the 21st century. But their efforts uncover man-made violence, and they are suddenly attacked and their entire squad murdered. Some secret plot is lurking in the ruins of Tokyo Bay District D, and to find it, Rei and Uozumi must join a privately funded hostage rescue organization run out of a Tokyo bar called Chicago. Now, Rei saves the lives of others while she searches for her own salvation.

== Characters ==
=== Squad Four ===
Rei (冷)
A tomboyish woman who worked for the Rescue Inc. After their partners are murdered, Uozumi is taken to jail.
Uozumi (魚住)
Partner of Rei.
Mika (ミカ)
Uozumi's boyfriend

=== Chicago Bar ===
Shin (シン)
A handsome recruit of Chicago Bar who works with Rei and Uozumi in their first mission. He and Rei seem to have romantic feelings.
JJ (ジェイ・ジェイ)
Boss of Jacky's Chicago Bar.
Scout
He's the man who takes Rei and Uozumi to the Chicago Bar.
Zion (ジオン, Jion)
A big guy who also is the recruit of Chicago.
Dr. "Thunder" Sanders (ドクター サンダー サンダース, Dokutā "Sandā" Sandāsu)
A bald scientist who seems weird. He invents special things.

=== Mission Hostage ===
Billy (ビリー, Birī)
A boy who was mistaken for Alto, his friend, and was kidnapped under his name by the bandits. He dreams of being a journalist. When he is saved by Rei, he thinks she's a cop and gets a mini-camera to her uniform. Afterward, she returns it to him and tells him not to peep.
Alto Dejoji
Son of a millionaire. He and Billy belong to the same club and are in the same photo. It is for this reason that Billy was mistaken for him.

== Volumes ==
No.	Original release date	Original ISBN	English release date	English ISBN
1	March 2001	4-09-135271-5	November 5, 2002	1-59116-041-3
2	August 2001	4-09-135272-3	May 15, 2003	1-56931-829-8

== Reception ==
In a column for Anime News Network, writer and cartoonist Shaenon K. Garrity listed Chicago as one of her favorite "badass" shōjo (girls') manga series; she stated that "virtually every page [of Chicago] contains something more incredibly hardcore than you have ever seen from characters with giant sparkly shojo eyes and even more ginormous shojo hair."
