= Marionette Generation =

Japanese manga series

- Cover of the first volume.

マリオネット ジェネレーション (Marionetto Jenereeshon)
- Genre: Romantic comedy
- Manga
- Written by: Haruhiko Mikimoto
- Published by: Kadokawa Shoten
- English publisher: NA: Viz Media
- Magazine: Newtype
- English magazine: NA: Animerica Extra
- Original run: July 1989 – March 1998
- Volumes: 5

Marionette Generation (マリオネット ジェネレーション, Marionetto Jenereeshon) is a Japanese manga series written and illustrated by Haruhiko Mikimoto. The manga was serialised in Kadokawa Shoten's Newtype beginning in 1989, and was later collected into five tankōbon volumes which were published between July 1989 and March 1998. The series was licensed in North America by Viz Media, who serialized it in Animerica Extra. The manga is also licensed in France by Panini Comics' Planet Manga imprint.

== Manga ==
Kadokawa Shoten released the manga's five tankōbon volumes between July 1989 and March 1998. Viz Media released the five volumes between July 6, 2001, and April 7, 2004. Individual chapters are called "part"s.

No.	Title	Original release date	English release date
1	Entrances	July 1989; 978-4-04-852221-2	July 6, 2001; 1-56931-558-2
01. "Sleeping Lady-1"; 02. "Sleeping Lady-2"; 03. "Sleeping Lady-3"; 04. "Sleeping Lady-4"; Extra Special Behind-the-Scenes Side Story: "What's My Name!?"; Side Story Collection: "Private Time"; 05. "Whisper-1"; 06. "Whisper-2"; 07. "Little Lovers-1"; 08. "Little Lovers-2"; 09. "Little Lovers-3"; 10. "Little Lovers-4"; 11. "Again-1"; 12. "Again-2"; 13. "Present"; Prequel Episode: "Unbalanced Hair"; An Autumn Princess Story: "A Profile of the Heart"
2	Pulling Strings	August 1991; 978-4-04-852225-0	February 9, 2002; 1-56931-708-9
14. "A Fan Letter"; 15. "Here I Am!"; 16. "Naughty, Naughty!"; 17. "This Can't Be Good"; 18. "My Uncle"; 19. "Looks Like a Kid"; 20. "You Owe Me!"; 21. "B-E-L-I-E-V-E"; 22. "Busted..."; 23. "ZZZZZ..."; 24. "Another One"; 25. "That's the Story..."; 26. "O.K.?"; 27. "Sheesh..."; 28. "Hear Me Roar!"
3	Manipulations	April 1994; 978-4-04-852480-3	July 6, 2002; 1-59116-024-3
29. "A Regular Girl"; 30. "A Normal Day For a Regular Girl"; 31. "A Normal Relationship"; 32. "Whoa!"; 33. "Sheesh"; 34. "Who?"; 35. "But It Can't Be...Can It?"; 36. "Why...?"; 37. "Maybe..."; 38. "Giggle"; 39. "It's Unnatural!"; 40. "Just an Ordinary..."; 41. "It Comes From Within"; 42. "Displays of Affection"; 43. "Conditions"; 44. "One Date, as Agreed"; 45. "What's Up with That?"; "Retribution"
4	Improvisations	April 1997; 978-4-04-852588-6	August 31, 2003; 1-59116-055-3
46. "Blush"; 47. "That About Sums It Up..."; 48. "Wishy-Washy"; 49. "Responsibility"; 50. "Lucky You"; 51. "Destiny"; 52. "Going Through a Rough Time"; 53. "Impulse"; 54. "Sorry to Inform You..."; 55. "Instead of Misty"; 56. "Huh!?"; 57. "Is It Because Of..."; 58. "Lucky!♥"; 59. "Acting Strange"; 60. "Another Friend of Yours...?"; 61. "Probably..."
5	Finale	March 1998; 978-4-04-852803-0	April 7, 2004; 1-59116-200-9
62. "What's Going On!?"; 63. "Somewhere Before..."; 64. "Wha-?"; 65. "Wel-come..."; 66. "Dense"; 67. "I Declare!"; 68. "I'm Counting On You"; 69. "Very Lucky"; 70. "Get Cracking"; 71. "Would You Like to Come Live With Me?"; 72. "Am I Sure?"; 73. "For Keeps"; "The Fifth One of the Plus One"

== Reception ==
Animefringe's Patrick King commends Mikimoto's artwork, saying that he has "an undeniable knack for illustrating characters that clearly convey their emotions". In a later review, King commends the series for its "sheer imagination and artistic brilliance" and comments that the manga's romance has "less panty shots and more drama than usual, and with the addition of a talking doll there's really no way you can go wrong here".
