= 7 Seeds =

Japanese manga series and its adaptation(s)

- First tankōbon volume cover, featuring Natsu Iwashimizu
- Genre: Science fiction; Survival
- Manga
- Written by: Yumi Tamura
- Published by: Shogakukan
- Magazine: Bessatsu Shōjo Comic (2001–2002); Flowers (2002–2017)
- Original run: November 2001 – July 2017
- Volumes: 35
- Original net animation
- Directed by: Yukio Takahashi
- Written by: Touko Machida
- Music by: Michiru
- Studio: Gonzo (#1–12); Studio Kai (#13–24)
- Licensed by: Netflix (worldwide): NA: Sentai Filmworks (Note: Home video rights through Section23 Films.)
- Released: 28 June 2019 – 26 March 2020
- Runtime: 24–31 minutes
- Episodes: 24
- icon

7 Seeds (stylized as 7SEEDS) is a Japanese manga series written and illustrated by Yumi Tamura. Set in a post-apocalyptic future, 7 Seeds takes place in an unspecified number of years after a meteorite hits Earth, where new species have evolved, and follows the struggles of five groups of young adults to survive after they are revived from cryonic preservation. The title comes from five groups of individuals in cryogenic chambers along with supplies, called "seeds", laid down by the Japanese government.

The manga was originally serialized in Shogakukan's Bessatsu Shōjo Comic magazine, premiering in the November 2001 issue; it transferred to Flowers magazine in April 2002, where it ran until its conclusion in May 2017. Shogakukan collected the individual chapters into 35 bound volumes.

An original net animation (ONA) adaptation, produced by Gonzo and directed by Yukio Takahashi, was announced in November 2018. The first season was released worldwide on Netflix in June 2019. A second season produced by Studio Kai premiered on 26 March 2020.

In 2007, 7 Seeds won the 52nd Shogakukan Manga Award for the shōjo category. Including digital sales, it has sold more than six million copies in Japan.

== Story ==
When astronomers predict that the Earth will be hit by a meteorite, the world leaders meet to develop a plan for human survival called the Seven Seeds project. Each country agrees to preserve numbers of healthy young people through cryogenics, which will allow them to survive the devastation of the impact. After a computer determines that Earth is once again safe for human life, it will revive each group. The Japanese government creates five groups of survivors named Winter, Spring, Summer A, Summer B, and Fall. Each group consists of seven members, who are not told about what will happen before they are placed in cryonic preservation, and one adult guide who is trained in wilderness survival. These groups are scattered across Japan: the Summer groups in southern and northern Kyūshū, Fall in western Honshū, Spring in central Honshū near Tokyo, and Winter in Hokkaidō.

Awoken from the cryogenic sleep many years later, the young men and women find themselves amidst a hostile environment fully absent of any human life apart from themselves. Their former home country Japan has greatly changed. Completely alone, they must depend only on themselves to survive in the new world.

== Setting ==
7 Seeds takes place an unknown number of years after the collision of a large meteorite with Earth. As a result of the impact, the climate of Japan has greatly changed from what the characters knew from the present day. In the Kansai region there are only two seasons, a dry season and a longer, heavier rainy season. Takahiro of Winter group describes the winters in the northern island of Hokkaidō as being as mild as in Kanagawa Prefecture where he grew up. In addition, sea levels have risen greatly: downtown Yokohama is completely underwater, only the top hand of the statue in Nagasaki Peace Park is above the surface of the ocean. The geography of Japan has changed as well: after an eruption of Mount Aso, Kyūshū has been split into two islands, and the Kansai region is separated from central Honshū by a wide strait. The series depicts a Japan in which, as a result of the new environment and mass extinctions, ecosystems have changed and several new species of animals and plants have evolved.

For example, on the island where Summer group B first lands, off the coast of Nagasaki Prefecture, Botan notes how few of the ecological niches are filled, including no birds or flying insects, and that the limited number of species are still radiating to fill empty niches. In particular, a local rodent resembling a rabbit is in the process of speciation into herbivorous and ravenously carnivorous versions, which are still visually similar. Other dangers new to the characters include swarms of carnivorous white cockroaches and gigantic Venus flytraps, sundews, and nepenthes. Species that are unchanged but were previously unknown in Japan include banana trees and crocodiles. Semimaru notes that neither on the island nor on the Kyūshū mainland do they see any ants, bees, or similar insects.

In the Kansai region, Fall group domesticates flightless birds about the size of a chicken and sheep that have grown to resemble llamas, which can be ridden, milked and shorn for wool. Izayoi tells Natsu that a local wasp is deadly, killing with a single sting, and another species has a sting that sickens the victim for a day. According to Akio, corn is the only crop from their seed cache that grows in the area's soils, but Fall group also cultivates a variety of tobacco with a narcotic effect when smoked.

In the southern part of central Honshū, Natsu, Arashi, and Semimaru of Summer group B cross a desert with cactus scrub. Throughout the region they find remains of large reptiles that revive from estivation during the rainy season, which remind Natsu of velociraptors from Jurassic Park. These "dinosaurs", as the characters call them, have grassland and woodland varieties, and during the rainy season are the dominant predator from the south coast to at least as far north as Tokyo.

On the island where the Spring group first lands, off the coast of the Kantō region, Hana notes that there are no vertebrates on land or in the sea, and Momotaro describes the ecology as similar to that of the Carboniferous Era. On land, there are giant insects the characters call "boat beetles" and swarms of bees with stings that are painful but not deadly, which force the group to live on rafts off-shore. In the island's swamps, there are giant praying mantis and giant dragonflies. While at the island, the group lives off shellfish and shallow-water nautiluses, but see no bony fish. The characters find the climate changed as well, as it is too overcast to see the stars for the first two weeks after they are awake, even though it is spring, a season that in the present day is noted for clear weather.

On the mainland of the Kantō region, Spring group meets large aquatic lizards living among the submerged ruins of Yokohama, which hunt in groups. Nearby, in the ruins of central Tokyo, the party from Summer group B is attacked by a giant predatory fish, which Takahiro of Winter group identifies as descended from a deep-sea fish, the only kind of bony fishes to have survived. They also meet a fungus-like growth Takahiro calls "blue mucus", which infects Hana's skin when she touches it. This growth goes dormant in the dry season, and Takahiro realizes it is intolerant to salt and uses it to cure her.

In northern Honshū near Sendai, Natsu, Arashi and Semimaru of Summer group B find the first flowers they have seen during their journey over most of the length of Japan.

In southern Hokkaidō, Winter group encounters grasslands populated by many mammals they do not know, including small-eared rodents, herds of unknown ruminants, and tigers with saber-teeth. They also meet wolves with the ability to project illusions normally used to help hunt.

The project organizers also prepared sealed caches containing seeds and instructional books near the "seven Fuji". These seven Fuji are not related to the famous Mount Fuji, but are regional landmarks also named Fuji:

- Bungo Fuji in Ōita Prefecture is Mt. Yufudake, where the cache is marked by a statue of the Buddha Vairocana.
- Ogino Fuji in Kanagawa Prefecture is Mt. Kyogatake, where the cache is marked by a statue of Monjubosatsu, the bodhisattva Manjusri.
- Kobe Fuji in Hyogo Prefecture is Mount Futatabi of the Rokkō Mountains, marked by a statue of Acala (Fudō myō-ō).
- Natori Fuji in Miyagi Prefecture is Mt. Taihaku, near Sendai, where the cache is marked by a statue of Kokūzō Bosatsu (Ākāśagarbha).
- Akan Fuji in Hokkaidō is Mt. Meakandake, where the cache is marked by a statue of Avalokiteśvara, the goddess of mercy.
- Tosa Fuji in Kumamoto Prefecture is Mount Takamori, marked by a statue of Mahāsthāmaprāpta.
- Noto Fuji in Ishikawa Prefecture is Mount Takatsume-ya, where the cache is marked by a statue of goddess Kikurihime.
- Fuji is a ghost ship with similar capabilities to the RP FLIP. The ghost ship is adrift at sea in a vast ship graveyard. It is marked by a painting of the buddha Samantabhadra riding on a white elephant's back. This Fuji was the only one kept hidden and used as a humans' shelter at the same time.

== Development and production ==
In an author's note, Tamura says that 7 Seeds was inspired by news reports that near-Earth object (89959) 2002 NT_{7} might potentially collide with Earth.

=== Songs ===
Yumi Tamura often includes certain songs in her chapter titles. If there is further info material available, you can find it using the links in the 'manga' table.

There are also songs that do not appear in chapter titles but still play a major role at turning points in the manga. Those are listed below.

- Bridge Over Troubled Water (by Simon and Garfunkel). ^{Appeared in Volume 3, East Wind Chapter 2, Spirit of Sound.}
- Die Fledermaus (The Bat) (by Johann Strauss II). ^{Appeared in Volume 14, Summer Solstice Chapter 11, Tell.}
- Clair de lune (by Claude-Achille Debussy). ^{Appeared in Volume 14, Summer Solstice Chapter 12, Know.}
- Minute Waltz (by Frédéric François Chopin). ^{Appeared in Volume 14, Summer Solstice Chapter 13, Hate.}
- Eine kleine Nachtmusik (by Wolfgang Amadeus Mozart). ^{Appeared in Volume 16, Summer Solstice Chapter 23, Farewell.}
- Csikós Post (by Hermann Necke). ^{Appeared in Volume 16, Summer Solstice Chapter 23, Farewell.}
- Pomp and Circumstance (by Sir Edward William Elgar). ^{Appeared in Volume 16, Summer Solstice Chapter 23, Farewell.}
- Nutcracker Suite (originally choreographed by Marius Petipa and Lev Ivanov with a score by Pyotr Ilyich Tchaikovsky). ^{Appeared in Volume 16, Summer Solstice Chapter 23, Farewell.}
- Orphée aux enfers (Orpheus in the Underworld) (by Jacques Offenbach). ^{Appeared in Volume 16, Summer Solstice Chapter 23, Farewell.}

=== The four seasons ===
The four seasons serve as the theme for 7 Seeds, since every team is named after one of them: Spring, Summer A/B, Autumn, and Winter. The team members were chosen into their teams based on which seasons their names matched best.

Almost every 7 Seeds chapter arc is named after one of the 24 solar terms consisting of the 72 pentads (Shichijūni kō). The Rainwater chapter, for example, completely consists of Shichijūni kō.

== Media ==
=== Manga ===
7 Seeds was written and illustrated by Yumi Tamura and published by Shogakukan. It began serialization in the November 2001 issue of the monthly shōjo manga magazine Bessatsu Shōjo Comic. In April 2002, it transferred to the monthly josei manga magazine Flowers. The final chapter was published in the July 2017 issue of Flowers, released on 27 May.

Shogakukan collected the individual chapters into 35 bound volumes, printed under the Flower Comics imprint, and later, under the Flower Comics Alpha imprint. The first volume was released on 26 March 2002; the last volume was released on 10 August 2017. Each volume was divided into sections focusing on different groups of survivors, with section titles containing a kigo (seasonal word) appropriate for the group name. Shogakukan also published an official fanbook, titled Edge of Emotions, on 9 December 2011. The fanbook contained detailed character profiles, a color illustration gallery, and a long interview with Tamura.

In 2008, Pika Édition licensed the manga in France, where it was marketed as a seinen series. In 2011, Pika announced that negotiations with the Japanese publisher, Shogakukan, had been unsuccessful, and therefore, they would cease publishing 7 Seeds and two other titles. In total, Pika published 10 volumes of the manga in French.

In 2017, after the conclusion of the 7 Seeds manga in Japan, Tamura announced the launch of a spin-off series in Flowers. The first chapter was published in the magazine's October issue, released on 28 August; the final chapter was published in the December issue, released on 28 October. Shogakukan collected the chapters into a single bound volume on 10 January 2018.

=== Drama CDs ===
7 Seeds was adapted into a radio drama which was broadcast in Japan from 9 December 2003 to 6 February 2004. The nine episodes were collected on three drama CDs:

- 7 Seeds 1, released on 26 March 2004, focuses on Summer group B and dramatizes the events of volume 1 of the manga.
- 7 Seeds 2, released on 23 April 2004, focuses on Winter group and dramatizes events of volume 4 of the manga.
- 7 Seeds 3, released on 21 May 2004, focuses on Spring group and dramatizes events of volumes 2 and 3 of the manga.

A fourth drama CD was released in Japan on 10 August 2017, bundled with a limited edition of volume 35 of the 7 Seeds manga. The story was based on an original scenario written by Yumi Tamura. Several voice actors who would later be cast in the anime adaptation of 7 Seeds were first featured on the drama CD, including Kazuhiko Inoue as Kaname Mozunoto, Shō Hayami as Takashi Sugurono, Nozomu Sasaki as Takahiro Aramaki, and Katsuyuki Konishi as Semimaru Asai.

=== Anime ===
An anime adaptation was announced on 26 November 2018. The series is animated by Gonzo and directed by Yukio Takahashi, with Touko Machida handling series composition, Youko Satou designing the characters, and Michiru composing the music. The series was originally scheduled to release on Netflix in April 2019, but it was delayed to 28 June 2019 due to production delays. Amatsuki performed the series' opening theme song "Ark", while majiko performed the series' ending theme song "WISH".

A second season premiered on 26 March 2020. The main cast and staff members reprised their roles, and Studio Kai producing the animation. Mone Kamishiraishi performed the second season's opening theme song "From the Seeds", which was composed by Glim Spanky, while Cider Girl performed the second season's ending theme "Synchro".

7 Seeds has received its North American home video release by Sentai Filmworks via Section23 Films on 28 December 2020 with the first season.

On 4 January 2021, the staff members announced that the second season's ending animation sequence has been removed after they were notified that it had similarities to the anime Beyond the Boundary's ending theme.

==== Season 1 (2019) ====
No. overall	No. in season	English title Original Japanese title	Original release date
1	1	"Spring Begins" (Japanese: 立春)	28 June 2019
A shy girl named Natsu Iwashimizu awakes during a storm and is taken aboard an inflatable boat with three others. No-one recalls what happened, and they paddle their way to a nearby rocky island. The others introduce themselves as Arashi Aota, Semimaru Asai and the older Botan Saotome. The group then look for water and food. Meanwhile, another group have also landed on an island; Hana Sugurono, Mansaku Tsunomata, Fujiko Amacha, Haru Yukima, Momotaro Nobi, Chisa Taiami, Hibari Nigusa and their leader, the arrogant and belligerent Dosei Yanagi. They encounter large aggressive insects and decide to leave on the raft they constructed, however they are caught in a storm and are shipwrecked back on the same island. While exploring, Yanagi falls into a group of insects although he returns later, seemingly unharmed. Elsewhere another group, awaken from cryogenic sleep, and when confronted by their erstwhile leader, Unami, they draw guns and shoot him.
2	2	"Insects Awaken" (Japanese: 啓蟄)	28 June 2019
Arashi falls ill after eating fungi collected by Natsu, however he soon recovers. The team continues its search for edible food, but Natsu and Arashi are captured by carnivorous plants and attacked by large rodents, however they are saved by the arrival of Mozu (Kaname Mozunoto) who was separated from his group. He explains that they are part of a government survival project and Botan explains the 7 Seeds project, but Arashi refuses to believe it and misses his girlfriend Hana. Meanwhile, Yanagi leads his group back to the waterfall where they encountered the giant insects assuring them that it will be safe. He then leads them into a tunnel, but it's a trap as he has been impregnated with insect larvae. However, he sets himself alight to save the others, and tells them to search for the 7 Fujis. The group returns to the shore and build another raft, and prepare to sail to the closest Fuji, Mt. Ogino Fuji.
3	3	"Light Snow" (Japanese: 小雪)	28 June 2019
Botan's group encounters three people being menaced by a crocodile in a pond, and she immediately jumps in to save them. Botan explains that they are the remainder of Summer Team B; Matsuri Tendō, Chimaki Yamori and Hotaru Kusakuri. Natsu realizes their island in a lake, so they build a raft and leave to find the outer shore. They arrive and begin the search for food, but also find the Nagasaki peace statue underwater. Botan decides to head for the nearest Fuji, Mt. Bungo Fuji, also known as Mt. Yufu. While walking, Natsu accidentally come across the entrance to one of the sealed caches containing the necessary materials for survival and self-sufficiency. Chimaki decides to visit his nearby home town of Kumamoto, and Natsu and Arashi accompany him, however they find that it is underwater. Arashi decides to travel to his home in Tokyo, vainly hoping to find his girlfriend Hana. Natsu initially accompanies him, but Semimaru follows and joins them. Along the way, they encounter some other humans. Meanwhile, the Spring team discover that they are near the ruins of Yokohama.
4	4	"Autumn Begins" (Japanese: 立秋)	28 June 2019
Arashi, Natsu and Semimaru realize that they have stumbled upon the Fall Team settlement which is above one of the sealed caches in the former Kobe region. The team have already been there for three years, but they are dominated by Akiwo Haza and Ran Shishigaki who ruthlessly allocate tasks to other members of the team and dominate the guide Ryoya Izayoi. When Semimaru tries to steal some food, the three travelers are tied up. Akiwo and Ran have banned sex in the team to avoid fulfilling the role for which they were selected. Ryoya, frees the three captives, but plans to poison them and everyone else because he feels that the 7 Seeds project has failed, but Semimaru stops him. They leave, but later, Ryoya helps them launch their inflatable boat to continue their journey towards Eastern Japan. They find another entrance to a sealed cache which is at either Mt. Ogino Fuji or Mt. Kyogatake, but is it is flooded and of little use. Meanwhile, Hana and Haru of the Spring Team paddle their inflatable through the partially submerged ruins of Yokohama. They camp the night in an abandoned church, and return to the team the next day. As Arashi's group settle for the night, they are watched by a bearded man.
5	5	"Heavy Snow" (Japanese: 大雪)	28 June 2019
Arashi decides to search underwater for signs of humans, but is suddenly confronted by a giant fish. When it tries to attack him, it is suddenly killed by a huge spear thrown by the bearded man accompanied by two wild dogs. His name is Takahiro Aramaki, the only survivor of the Winter Team who died fifteen years ago. Meanwhile, Hana and the Spring Team find the same flooded cache as Arashi, including food, books and supplies that are still intact. After they find a letter written by Natsu to any other survivors, Mansaku Tsunomata states that they must accept their current situation and survive. Fearing Takahiro, Arashi, Natsu and Semimaru leave during the night. Takihiro finds himself alone again with his dogs. He recalls how four of his team were killed by a saber-toothed tiger-like cat soon after emerging. He befriended a wild dog which followed them, but Fubuki was later killed by the same tiger while saving Takahiro and Mitsuru. She later froze to death while dancing in the snow. The dog died from her wounds, but her two pups became the foundation of his pack of dogs. Back in the present, Takahiro sees Hana being chased by a dinosaur-like creature and he uses his dogs to save her.
6	6	"Grain Rain" (Japanese: 穀雨)	28 June 2019
Takahiro is taken in by the Spring Team, although there is some mistrust. He tells Hana about the three people he met and she thinks one may be Arashi. Hana accidentally touches a plant which Takahiro says are poisonous, and she begins to develop symptoms. She decides to avoid infecting the others and leaves alone to find Arashi, but she is knocked into the water by a giant fish. She decides that life is not worth living, but is rescued by Takahiro who takes her to the island on which Summer Team B first landed. However, her health continues to deteriorate, and she wanders off alone expecting to die. When she sees a message carved in the rock by Arashi, she regains the will to live. Takahiro realizes that salt somewhat neutralizes the poison and finds a salty pond to help Hana recover. Takahiro, Haru and Hana return to the Fall Team's settlement, but find it abandoned and covered in volcanic ash. Meanwhile, Arashi and his group find another cache and a sailing boat.
7	7	"Winter Solstice" (Japanese: 冬至)	28 June 2019
Arashi, Natsu and Semimaru decide it is time to return to Kyushu and rejoin their team using the sailing boat. Meanwhile, Takahiro, Haru and Hana find a tunnel entrance and two members of the Fall Team underground. One captures Haru who insists that he has been hearing the sound of a motor. When Takahiro's group go to find them, Akiwo and Ran and Team Fall take their inflatable raft and move further into the underground system which appears to be an evacuation complex. They find that power is available and they access the computer system. Meanwhile, Takahiro's group also explore another part of the complex where they find a body and a diary. The diary details the experience of Mark Ibaraki, a ventriloquist who was hired by Hana's father, Takashi Sugurono, along with other entertainers for the Ryugu Shelter which was described as a new underground theme park. Soon the meteorites hit earth, destroying the surface. Mark realized that they were engaged to distract the survivors. The facility was not able to cope with the disaster, and eventually after food supplies ran out. Then a deadly infection called the Acari X virus spread throughout the facility and it was sealed off. The last survivors were frozen to death to prevent the disease spreading and Mark was the last to die, taking his own life. As the 7 Seeds survivors emerge from the complex they are confronted by armed people wearing protective clothing and are accused of spreading the X virus. As Ran is about to be shot, Ryoya leaps in front of her and is shot instead.
8	8	"Summer Solstice" (Japanese: 夏至)	28 June 2019
The armed group decide that the X virus has probably already been released, and leave the teams to their own devices. As Ryoya dies, he reveals to Hana that it was Arashi who inspired him to survive and help his team. When they arrive back at Team Spring's camp, they find it destroyed and Fujiko Amacha, Mansaku Tsunomata, Chisa Taiami and Momota Nobi missing. Takahiro suggests they travel on to his former camp. Meanwhile, Arashi, Natsu and Semimaru learn how to sail the boat and find a girl who looks like Hotaru floating in the water. Her name is Hibari from the Spring Team who says that Hotaru is dying. Elsewhere, Momota from Team Spring is found by Summer Team A but Madonna casually tests food and medical treatments on him rather than her own team. They then use him as bait to attract predators which they can kill for food. Ran and the others come across Summer Team A's well designed camp and realize they were who ones who shot Ryoya. Away from the camp, Koruri comes across Haru making music while flying her hang glider. Takahiro creates a diversion while Hana attempts to rescue Momota, but they are caught. In retaliation, the group capture Koruri and offer to trade her for Momota. Suddenly, Takahiro and the camp is attacked by a colony of white carnivorous bats, and everyone cooperates to defeat them.
9	9	"Lesser Heat" (Japanese: 小暑)	28 June 2019
Slowly, Summer Team A and the other group begin to cooperate, although there is still some mistrust between them. Together they successfully devise a plan to get rid of the bat colony using music made by Haru playing Die Fledermaus. They form an uneasy truce and Summer Team A also help treat the injuries of the others, including Kurumi Shikano who is pregnant with Ryusei Ogiwara's child. When Ango discovers that Hana is the daughter of Professor Takashi, he tells everyone about the program which created the Summer Team A, and how he protected his younger friend Shigaru. However, he discovered that those who failed were not returned to the outside world, but killed. On board the boat, Arashi, Natsu and Semimaru learn that Hotaru is a cousin of Hibari.
10	10	"Cold Dew" (Japanese: 寒露)	28 June 2019
After his discovery about the training program, Ango had to reconcile himself that only the chosen seven would leave alive and he focused completely on his survival skills. Towards the end of training he found that items were sabotaged causing the inattentive students to sustain accidents. After the school caught fire, he realized that only the seven students who survived would be chosen. He also heard that one of the group will be a "reaper". Towards the end, they are both told that only he or Shigaru will be chosen from their group, but they remained friends to the end when Shigaru sacrificed himself to save Ango although Ryo caused his death. Finally when the seven surviving students are selected to be Team Summer A members, the instructors are surprised that they are not in a mood to celebrate following the deaths of their comrades. Consequently, when they awake from their hibernation they kill Umami, the instructor selected to lead them. Ango finishes his story, but shows his resentment to Hana because of her association with Professor Takashi and his team.
11	11	"Greater Heat" (Japanese: 大暑)	28 June 2019
Ango's animosity towards Hana increases, and she becomes convinced that Ango will kill her if she stays in the village. She decides to leave, and Takahiro offers to leave with her as does Haru. Ango tries to rape Hana, but he is stopped by Ayu and Hana realizes that Arashi is no longer there to protect her. Hana prepares to leave that night. Meanwhile, the boat of Arashi and the others becomes snagged and they make landfall near the abandoned former settlement of the Fall Team. Natsu finds a note to Arashi from Hana, but she hesitates to show him. Later, Natsu and Semimaru encounter Matsuri and who tells them that Botan and Hibari are in danger. Kaname Mozunoto rescues them and Hibari and Hotaru meet for the first time. Later, Natsu gives Hana's note to Arashi.
12	12	"End of Heat" (Japanese: 処暑)	28 June 2019
Ryo orders Hana to join the group in searching for a water source underground, putting her in a vulnerable position. In the caves, Ryo, Hana and Ayu descend further looking for water, and Ryo tells Hana about her father. However he cuts her rope, letting her fall to her death to because he fears that she is causing Ango to become mentally unstable. When Ryo and Ayu return, the others decide to try to find Hana. Meanwhile, Hana survived the fall and continues to look for water and Haru plays a flute to signal their location in case she is still alive. Elsewhere in the cave, Ango hears an imaginary voice blaming him for Shigaru's death, and when he come across Hana. He pushes her into the swirling water just as the others reach them. As they prepare to save her, she yells that Ryo is not to be trusted. Just as Koruri reaches her, Hana is swept away. Gengorou unsuccessfully tries to save her. When they return to the camp, Takihiro approaches Ryo and accuses him of being a murderer.

==== Season 2 (2020) ====
No. overall	No. in season	English title Original Japanese title	Original release date
13	1	"Frost Descends" (Japanese: 霜降)	26 March 2020
Following Hanna's disappearance in the underground river, the community become increasingly antagonistic towards Ango for his behaviour. When Ango pulls a knife on the others, Takahiro Aramaki throws a rock at his hand to disarm him and injures the hand. Ango decides to leave and Ryo accompanies him. The others then create a new dry season camp near the watercourse to avoid carrying water back to their base camp. Takahiro decides to leave and search for Hanna whom he believes is still alive, and Ayu joins him. Meanwhile, Kaname Mozunoto watches the developments from afar. As they travel, Ango and Ryo come across a sailing boat jammed between some rocks in a bay.
14	2	"Summer Begins" (Japanese: 夏至)	26 March 2020
Ango and Ryo surmise the group they found are Summer Team B. They are inadvertently discovered and introduce themselves. The group is friendly, but Semimaru is suspicious of the visitors. Ango observes that they appear to lead a carefree and unstructured life. One evening, Niigusa Hibari does palm reading, but after she looks Ango's left palm because of his injured right hand, she commences surprisingly crying but says she cannot read his palm.
15	3	"Grain in Ear" (Japanese: 穀雨)	26 March 2020
Ango and Ryo spend more time with Summer Team B and find a solution to releasing the sailing boat from the rocks. Hibari expresses misgivings to Saotome about sailing with Ango and Ryo, however the combined group set sail to explore the island. Meanwhile, Takahiro and Ayu travel on together and he asks her to adopt a black puppy which is being bullied by the other dogs. As Summer Team B sails at night, Ryo deliberately closes the windows so that everyone succumbs to carbon monoxide poisoning. When Ango notices, gets Ryo to help him drag everyone on deck to revive them, not knowing that Ryo caused the crisis. Days later Arashi prepares to dive off the boat to go scavenging, and Ryo offers to go with him.
16	4	"Autumnal Equinox" (Japanese: 秋分)	26 March 2020
As Arashi searches for food underwater, he becomes caught in some reeds and Ango saves him. The team recommissions a sauna room on the boat and take turns using it, but Ryo locks Semimaru inside. Fortunately Natsu finds him and the others revive Semimaru. Natsu admits to Ango that tier team never received any training and were in fact regarded as dropouts. Later, Arashi goes diving again and tells Ryo who does not inform the others. Sometime later they realize he is missing and become distraught and prepare to turn back. Meanwhile, has Arashi surfaced to find the boat has sailed on.
17	5	"Vernal Equinox" (Japanese: 春分)	26 March 2020
Saotome becomes suspicious of Ango and Ryo and searches their cabin. She finds a gun, but is interrupted by Ango and makes an excuse and leaves. She recalls her briefing before entering cryogenic sleep in which the possession of guns by the teams was not recommended, and that a potassium cyanide capsule would be issued to the leaders in case it would be needed for suicide or to kill others. Meanwhile, Arashi manages to survive the night, dreaming of Hanna, and the next day lands on a rocky island with strange plants. Elsewhere, Hanna wakes up on a beach and thinks of Arashi as she recalls her father's words to keep on living. She explores her surroundings of barren rocky mountains, and encounters various animals and a herd of wild horse which she follows in search of water.
18	6	"White Dew" (Japanese: 白露)	26 March 2020
While searching for Arashi, the team's boat sails into a fog. It becomes caught in thick sticky algae adjacent to a ship graveyard and Semimaru decides to fly Arashi's kite as a signal. Meanwhile, Arashi discovers the "trees" on his island are actually windmills covered in vegetation. He sees his kite flying and realizes that the boat must be nearby. The fog begins to lift and Chimaki sees a giant structure beside them and suspects that it is one of the seven Fujis. Semimaru finds a way to the structure which is revealed to be a ghost ship. The others, including Ango and Ryo, join him to explore, leaving Chimaki behind on their boat. As they explore the ship, its power circuits switch on, but then it begins listing heavily and Natsu becomes separated from the others. Back on their boat, Chimaki tries to lower the sails and is knocked into the water.
19	7	"Winter Begins" (Japanese: 冬至)	26 March 2020
The ship mysteriously orients itself vertically and stabilizes. The group find themselves separated, however they each finds clues about the events which have taken place on the ship. Meanwhile, Arashi reaches their boat and after he helps Chimaki out of the water, he follows the others onto the old ship. Saotome and Hibari find the captain's cabin and watch a video recorded many years earlier by the captain in which he describes the last days of the ship as supplies ran out and the crew had begun fighting among themselves. He decided to fire the ship's missiles towards Japan to put the surviving Japanese people out of their misery, then and started a countdown which does not appear to have been completed. Suddenly, the countdown restarts. Elsewhere on the ship, Ango has become disorientated and delirious. When he sees a figure he believes it is Ukai and fires his gun, not realizing that the figure is Arashi.
20	8	"Lesser Cold" (Japanese: 小寒)	26 March 2020
Even though the ship is very old and only partly functional, Saotome decides they must stop the countdown of the missile launch and destruction of the ship with a deadline of approximately 13 hours. Meanwhile, Ango apologizes to Arashi for shooting at him. Ango missed, although he is concerned about the fact that he was hallucinating. The pair find themselves trapped at the lower levels, but fortunately Natsu rescues them using a mobile crane. Ango and Ryo communicate using Morse code to confirm their locations. Meanwhile, the horses lead Hanna to a waterhole which shared by many other animals, including an alligator.
21	9	"Grain Full" (Japanese: 小満)	26 March 2020
Hanna discovers that alligators are not the only danger on the island after the huge leaves of a tree capture and kill one of the horses. Back on the ghost ship, Ango berates Natsu for risking her life to save them, however she begins to assert herself as she gains more confidence. Meanwhile, Ryo decides to take Semimaru and Matsuri to find Ango, Arashi and Natsu. At the same time, Saotome and Hibari make their way to the control room, but are unable to stop the countdown. As Ryo tries to reach Ango, he becomes incredulous at the unfocused antics of Semimaru and Matsuri who play around, seemingly oblivious to the dangers around them. Meanwhile, back at the island that evening, Hanna sees two figures in the distance holding a flaming torch.
22	10	"Rain Water" (Japanese: 雨水)	26 March 2020
Hanna recognizes Fujiko and Chisa as the figures in the distance and they have a tearful reunion, exchanging stories about their separate experiences. Back on the ghost ship, the two groups separately make their way to the top. However, Ango becomes distraught and tells Arashi and Narsu about Shiggeru's death. Arashi cannot understand Ango's motivation to survive at the expense of the other students. He asserts that they were manipulated by the professors, and that they are now free to take control of their own lives. At that moment, the two groups reconnect, and Ryo tells Ango that Shiggeru cut the rope himself during the test at the same time as Ryo to save Ango, forcing Ango to accept the reality of their current situation. With the air cleared, the two groups continue on their way upwards.
23	11	"Greater Cold" (Japanese: 大寒)	26 March 2020
The two groups make their way to the ship's command center and find Saotome and Hibari already there. Saotome explains the former captain's proposed missile launch towards Japan, and they decide that their only option is to stop the launch. They split into groups to seek out the four cancellation devices spread throughout the ship. Surprisingly, members of Summer Team B prove to be adept at deciphering the access codes to each of the devices, however when they press the buttons, the countdown fails to stop. They then decide to cut the ship's power, but find it difficult to move through the ship because metal-eating bacteria is rapidly spreading through the ship.
24	12	"Pure Brightness" (Japanese: 清明)	26 March 2020
After failing to stop the missile launch countdown, everyone decides to reconvene in the control room before leaving the ship. However, the condition of the ship continues to deteriorate due to the rapidly spreading bacteria. They find that they have to cooperate and use all of their individual skills to return to the control room. As they arrive, the ship begins to shut down, finally succumbing to the ravages of the bacteria which also stops the missile launch. As they prepare to leave the ship, they realize that everyone played their part in overcoming their challenges, and even Ango and Ryo begin to appreciate the diverse talents of the misfits in Summer Team B. Meanwhile, separately Arashi and Hanna come to the same realization, that they must accept their place in the new world.

=== Stage play ===
A stage play adaptation of the manga, titled 7 Seeds: Spring Chapter (7SEEDS～春の章～), ran from 20 to 29 December 2024, in Tokyo's Kokumin Kyōsai coop Hall / Space Zero. The stage play will star Iori Sagara as Hana Sugurono, Naoki Kunishima as Haru Yukima, Ryosuke Yamamoto as Mansaku Tsunomata, Rio Sawada as Hibari Nigusa, Maasa Sudo as Chisa Taiami, Rento Nishimiya as Momotaro Nobi, Karen Aizome as Fujiko Amacha, Yojiro Murata as Dosei Yanagi, Ryo Taguchi as Takahiro Aramaki, and Hiroki Nakata as Kaname Mozunoto.

== Reception ==
7 Seeds won the 52nd Shogakukan Manga Award for the shōjo category in 2007. The series ranked number 10 on the top 20 list of manga for female readers in the 2018 edition of Takarajimasha's Kono Manga ga Sugoi! guidebook. It was nominated in the comic category for the 49th Seiun Awards in 2018.

Including digital sales, the series has sold more than 6 million copies in Japan. Volume 12 reached number 7 on the Tohan best-seller list and volume 13 reached number 10.
