= Animerica Extra =

Manga magazine

- Animerica Extra vol. 1, issue 1
- Categories: Manga (shōjo)
- Frequency: Monthly
- Founded: 1998
- Final issue: December 2004
- Company: Viz Media
- Country: United States, Canada
- Based in: San Francisco, California
- Language: English

Animerica Extra was a monthly manga magazine published in by Viz Media. Established as a companion to the anime news and review magazine Animerica, Animerica Extra primarily published English-language translations of Japanese manga. The magazine shifted towards publishing shōjo manga (girls' manga) in 2003, before ceasing publication in late 2004, replaced by Shojo Beat the following year.

== History ==
Animerica Extra was conceived as a sister publication to Animerica, Viz's general interest anime and manga magazine. Amid the anime boom of the 1990s, Animerica Extra and the Viz manga magazines Manga Vizion and Pulp were among the first English-language manga magazines to publish manga titles aimed at demographics outside of children's manga, and have been noted as being "instrumental in disseminating manga culture" in North America. The magazine principally published English-language translations of manga, though it published non-manga content such as the short stories of Mitsuru Adachi, and feature stories on manga, anime, and Japanese culture. Certain issues featured original cover artwork by manga artists, including Haruhiko Mikimoto and Chiho Saito.

Sales for the magazine were initially strong; in August 2001, ICv2 reported that Animerica Extra had grown its circulation month-over-month for over a year, and cited the magazine's growth as proof of uncaptured potential in the American shōjo market. Animerica Extra's readership was roughly 70 percent female; ICv2 additionally noted that retailers such as Mile High Comics were able to capitalize on the success of Animerica Extra to attract female customers to comic book stores. Following the cancellation of Pulp in 2002, the magazine's serialization of Banana Fish continued in Animerica Extra. In July 2003, the magazine began publishing shōjo manga exclusively and began printing certain manga in its original right-to-left format, as opposed to the flipped artwork it had previously published.

In December 2004, Animerica Extra ceased publication. The magazine was replaced by the manga magazine Shojo Beat, which was published by Viz from July 2005 until July 2009.

== Serializations ==
The following titles were serialized in Animerica Extra:

- Banana Fish by Akimi Yoshida (Note: Serialization continued from Pulp after the magazine folded in 2004.)
- Chicago by Yumi Tamura
- Fushigi Yūgi by Yuu Watase
- Maison Ikkoku by Rumiko Takahashi (Note: Only four chapters of Maison Ikkoku were published in Animerica Extra; the full series was published under Viz's Editor's Choice imprint.)
- Marionette Generation by Haruhiko Mikimoto
- Revolutionary Girl Utena by Chiho Saito and Be-Papas
- Short Program by Mitsuru Adachi
- Steam Detectives by Kia Asamiya
- Video Girl Ai by Masakazu Katsura
- Wild Com. by Yumi Tamura
- SOS by Hinako Ashihara
- Times Two by Shouko Akira
- X/1999 by Clamp (Note: Serialization of X/1999 was suspended from July 2001 until March 2002 due to licensing issues.)

Titles serialized in Animerica Extra were also published as collected editions by Viz.

== See also ==
- List of manga magazines published outside of Japan
