= Don't Call It Mystery =

Japanese manga series

- First tankōbon volume cover, featuring Totonō Kunō

ミステリと言う勿れ (Misuteri to Iu Nakare)
- Genre: Mystery
- Manga
- Written by: Yumi Tamura
- Published by: Shogakukan
- English publisher: NA: Seven Seas Entertainment
- Imprint: Flowers Comics α
- Magazine: Monthly Flowers
- Original run: November 28, 2017 – present
- Volumes: 16
- Television drama
- Directed by: Hiroaki Matsuyama
- Written by: Tomoko Aizawa
- Music by: Ken Arai
- Licensed by: Viki
- Original network: Fuji TV
- Original run: January 10, 2022 – March 28, 2022
- Episodes: 12
- Live-action television film
- Directed by: Hiroaki Matsuyama
- Written by: Tomoko Aizawa
- Music by: Ken Arai
- Released: September 15, 2023
- icon

Don't Call It Mystery (Japanese: ミステリと言う勿れ, Hepburn: Misuteri to Iu Nakare), also known as Do Not Say Mystery, is a Japanese manga series written and illustrated by Yumi Tamura. It has been serialized in Shogakukan's josei manga magazine Monthly Flowers since November 2017. A television drama adaptation was broadcast on Fuji TV from January to March 2022.

By February 2026, the manga had over 22 million copies in circulation. In 2022, Don't Call It Mystery won the 67th Shogakukan Manga Award for the general category.

== Plot ==
One day in winter, university student Totonō Kunō was accompanied to the police station to be investigated by detectives from the Ohinari Police Station, who visited his apartment in connection with the murder of Sagae, a fellow student and high school alumnus. It is said that Sagae was seen arguing with someone who looked like Kuno around 10 o'clock last night. Kuno categorically denies committing the crime, and goes to question and investigate an Inspector called Yabu and his friends every day.

== Characters ==
Totonō Kunō
Portrayed by: Masaki Suda
Shioji Kariatsumari
Portrayed by: Nanoka Hara (film)
Yura Akamine
Portrayed by: Ko Shibasaki (film)
Asaharu Rumazaka
Portrayed by: Kouhei Matsushita (film)
Rikinosuke Kariatsumari
Portrayed by: Keita Machida (film)
Neo Hahakabe
Portrayed by: Riku Hagiwara (film)

== Media ==
=== Manga ===
Written and illustrated by Yumi Tamura, Don't Call It Mystery was first published as a one-shot in Shogakukan's josei manga magazine Monthly Flowers on November 28, 2016. It started as a serialized manga in the same magazine on November 28, 2017. Shogakukan has collected its chapters into individual tankōbon volumes. The first volume was published on January 10, 2018. As of February 10, 2026, 16 volumes have been released.

At Anime Expo 2022, Seven Seas Entertainment announced that they licensed the series for English publication.

==== Volumes ====
| No. | Original release date | Original ISBN | English release date | English ISBN |
|---|---|---|---|---|
| 1 | January 10, 2018 | 978-4-09-870029-5 | May 30, 2023 | 978-1-68579-719-5 |
Chapter 1: "A Single Subject"; Chapter 2 (Part 1): "Conversation with a Criminal"; Omake: "Tamu Tamu Time"
| 2 | May 10, 2018 | 978-4-09-870120-9 | May 30, 2023 | 978-1-68579-719-5 |
Chapter 2 (Part 2): "Conversation with a Criminal"; Chapter 3: "A Passing Train"; Chapter 4: "The Planned and the Unplanned"; "[Behind the Curtain] Between Chapter 2 and Chapter 3"; Omake: "Tamu Tamu Time"
| 3 | October 10, 2018 | 978-4-09-870204-6 | August 29, 2023 | 978-1-68579-720-1 |
Chapter 4 (Part 2): "The Heirs and Their Storehouses"; Chapter 4 (Part 3): "Something that Left a Mark"; Chapter 4 (Part 4): "A Gathering of Demons"; Omake: "Tamu Tamu Time"
| 4 | February 8, 2019 | 978-4-09-870406-4 | August 29, 2023 | 978-1-68579-720-1 |
Chapter 4 (Part 5): "Killed Too Soon"; Chapter 5: "Rain on the Chopping Block"; Chapter 6: "Cursed Bedtime Stories"; Chapter 7: "Hot or Not?"; Omake: "Tamu Tamu Time"
| 5 | September 10, 2019 | 978-4-09-870542-9 | December 12, 2023 | 978-1-68579-950-2 |
Chapter 8: "The Angel Has His Say"; Chapter 8 (Part 2): "Near and Far from the Flames"; Chapter 8 (Part 3): "Disappearing with the Light Snow"; Chapter 8 (Part 4): "The Frog's Flame Drawings"; Omake: "Tamu Tamu Time"
| 6 | February 10, 2020 | 978-4-09-870861-1 | December 12, 2023 | 978-1-68579-950-2 |
Chapter 9: "The Not-a-Date Date"; Chapter 2.5: "They Still Haven't Found the Bones"; Chapter 2.5 (Part 2): "The Box that Won't Open"; Chapter 2.5 (Part 3): "The Curtain that Fell Again and Again"; Omake: "Tamu Tamu Time"
| 7 | September 10, 2020 | 978-4-09-871103-1 | April 23, 2024 | 979-8-88843-350-8 |
Chapter 10: "Ivy House in the Storm"; Chapter 10 (Part 2): "If Only I Could Lie"; Chapter 10 (Part 3): "Just One Lie"; Omake: "Tamu Tamu Time"
| 8 | March 10, 2021 | 978-4-09-871277-9 | April 23, 2024 | 979-8-88843-350-8 |
Chapter 11: "Silver-Tongued Starry Night"; Chapter 12: "An Encouraging Story"; Chapter 13: "An Optimistic Cynic"; Omake: "Tamu Tamu Time"
| 9 | July 9, 2021 | 978-4-09-871400-1 | August 20, 2024 | 979-8-89160-041-6 |
Chapter 13 (Part 2): "Let No One Sleep"; Chapter 12.5: "Enclosure"; Chapter 14 (Part 1): "Who, What, When, Where and Why"; Chapter 14 (Part 2): "A Restless Night"; Omake: "Tamu Tamu Time"
| 10 | December 10, 2021 | 978-4-09-871497-1 | August 20, 2024 | 979-8-89160-041-6 |
Chapter 14 (Part 3): "After Searching Far and Wide"; Chapter 14 (Part 4): "Everything Comes Full Circle"; Chapter 14 (Part 5): "Rondeau"; Chapter 14 (Part 6): "Devilry at the Water's Edge"; Omake: "Tamu Tamu Time"
| 11 | June 10, 2022 | 978-4-09-871690-6 | December 17, 2024 | 979-8-89160-042-3 |
Chapter 15: "Lost Moments, Overlaid"; Chapter 16: "The Flavors of Fortune"; Chapter 14.5: "Riptide at My Feet"; Side Story: "Scenes of a Marriage"; Omake: "Tamu Tamu Time"
| 12 | January 10, 2023 | 978-4-09-871884-9 | December 17, 2024 | 979-8-89160-042-3 |
Chapter 17: "A Single Ripple"; Chapter 17 (Part 2): "Ruling Out Murder"; Chapter 17 (Part 3): "Under the Water's Surface"; Chapter 17 (Part 4): "The Crashing Tides of Time"; Chapter 17 (Part 5): "Swept Away"; Omake: "Tamu Tamu Time"
| 13 | September 8, 2023 | 978-4-09-872214-3 | June 24, 2025 | 979-8-89373-283-2 |
Chapter 17 (Part 6): "High-Quality Sleep"; Chapter 17 (Part 7): "Ambiguous Murders"; Chapter 17 (Part 8): "Where is Mr. Bear?"; Chapter 17 (Part 9): "The Lion's Share"; Chapter 17 (Part 10): "The Sea Will Remember"; Omake: "Tamu Tamu Time"
| 14 | June 10, 2024 | 978-4-09-872672-1 | June 24, 2025 | 979-8-89373-283-2 |
Chapter 18: "Morality in Confinement"; Chapter 18 (Part 2): "Rattled Red Beans"; Chapter 18 (Part 3): "Royal Plans"; Interlude: "An Ordinary Day"; Chapter 19: "A Brief Tour"; Omake: "Tamu Tamu Time"
| 15 | March 10, 2025 | 978-4-09-872897-8 | — | — |
| 16 | February 10, 2026 | 978-4-09-873295-1 | — | — |

=== Drama ===
In June 2021, it was announced that the series would be adapted into a drama series, starring Masaki Suda as Totonō Kunō. It was broadcast on Fuji TV from January 10 to March 28, 2022. It was directed by Hiroaki Matsuyama, with scriptwriting handled by Tomoko Aizawa, and music composed by Ken Arai. King Gnu performs the series' theme song "Chameleon" (カメレオン, Kamereon). The streaming service Viki added the series to its catalogue in May 2022.

==== Episodes ====
| Episode no. | Title | Original release date |
|---|---|---|
| 1 | "A strange college student is suspected of murder, and there are as many truths as there are people!" Transliteration: "Kawarimono no daigakusei ga satsujin yōgi, shinjitsu wa hito no kazu dake aru!" (Japanese: 変わり者の大学生が殺人容疑、真実は人の数だけある！) | January 10, 2022 |
Totonō Kunō, a university student, is making curry in his apartment from the early morning, until a detective suddenly comes to his door.
| 2 | "Strange bus jack! The purpose is..." Transliteration: "Kimyōna basu jakku! Sono mokuteki wa" (Japanese: 奇妙なバスジャック！その目的は・・・) | January 17, 2022 |
The bus which Totonō uses to get to an exhibition gets hijacked.
| 3 | "Finally the bus jacking is resolved! Who is the culprit!? Sad revenge." Transliteration: "Tsuini basu jakku kaiketsu-hen! Han'nin wa dareda? Kanashiki fukushū" (Japanese: 遂にバスジャック解決編！犯人は誰だ！？哀しき復讐) | January 24, 2022 |
Members from the Police Department rush to the location where Totonō and the other passengers from the bus are being held captive.
| 4 | "Where is the bomber with memory loss? Stop the explosion" Transliteration: "Kioku sōshitsu no bakudan ma, bakudan wa doko e? Bakuhatsu o kuitomero" (Japanese: 記憶喪失の爆弾魔、爆弾はどこへ？爆発を食い止めろ) | January 31, 2022 |
When Totonō is having fun making some curry, he receives a sudden call from one of the police officers.
| 5 | "Strange hospitalized life! The unsolved case from 22 years resurfaces." Transliteration: "Kimyōna nyūin seikatsu! 22-Nen mae no mikaiketsujiken ga ugokidasu" (Japanese: 奇妙な入院生活！22年前の未解決事件が動き出す) | February 7, 2022 |
Totonō, who was hit on the head in the bombing incident, is admitted to the hospital for a checkup.
| 6 | "The darkness hidden in the arson murder, the angel of fire that saves children! What is mysterious woman's aim!?" Transliteration: "Hōka satsujin ni hisomu yami, kodomo o sukuu honō no tenshi! Nazo no josei no mokuteki wa!?" (Japanese: 放火殺人に潜む闇、子供を救う炎の天使！謎の女性の目的は！？) | February 14, 2022 |
On the night before he is to be discharged from the hospital, Totonō takes action after he sees a code hidden on the bulletin board.
| 7 | "The conclusion of the angel of fire arc! The identity of the angel of fire... the astonishing truth is revealed." Transliteration: "Honō no tenshi-hen kanketsu! Honō no tenshi no shōtai to wa kyōgaku no shinjitsu ga akiraka ni" (Japanese: 炎の天使編完結！炎の天使の正体とは・・・驚愕の真実が明らかに) | February 21, 2022 |
Totonō begins to investigate a strange arson murder case. He finds out that the parents of the family whose house was set on fire are dead, but only the children survived.
| 8 | "The curtain rises on the mystery night! Will you kill? Or will you be killed?" Transliteration: "Misuterīnaito kaimaku! Korosu no ka? Korosa reru no ka?" (Japanese: ミステリーナイト開幕！殺すのか？殺されるのか？) | February 28, 2022 |
When Totonō goes to visit a grave, he meets someone unexpected.
| 9 | "Mystery Night Truth Edition! Who killed my mentor?" Transliteration: "Misuterīnaito shinsō-hen! Onjin o koroshita no wa dareda" (Japanese: ミステリーナイト真相編！恩人を殺したのは誰だ) | March 7, 2022 |
At a mountain lodge meeting on mystery to which Totonō is invited to, he discovers that a stalker had committed a crime there.
| 10 | "Final episode! Goodbye, Raika"; Transliteration: "Fainaru episōdo! Sayōnara, Raika-san" (Japanese: ファイナルエピソード！さようなら、ライカさん・・・) | March 14, 2022 |
Totonō and Raika decide to make a New Year's shrine visit. Later over yakiniku, Raika tells the story of her sister Chiyako.
| 11 | "The story finally reaches its climax!" Transliteration: "Monogatari wa iyoiyo kuraimakkusu e!" (Japanese: 物語はいよいよクライマックスへ！) | March 21, 2022 |
Four months ago (between episodes 3 and 4), a new series of serial killings have begun and Detective Furomitsu is dispatched to neighboring Shibahama police station to assist. Meanwhile Garo is still on the search for the mysterious "Jute".
| 12 | "Secrets hidden in the letter The truth of the sister's death revealed There is not one truth" Transliteration: "Tegami ni kakusa reta himitsu... abaka reru imōto no shi no shinsō, shinjitsu wa hitotsu janai" (Japanese: 手紙に隠された秘密...暴かれる妹の死の真相､真実は一つじゃない) | March 28, 2022 |

=== Live-action film ===
In November 2022, Fuji TV announced that a live-action film adaptation was being produced, again starring Suda as Totonō Kunō. Matsuyama, Aizawa and Arai return from the drama series as their respective positions. The film premiered on September 15, 2023. It is based on the manga's "Hiroshima Arc". It screened at the 28th Fantasia International Film Festival on July 26, 2024.

== Reception ==
By July 2021, the manga had over 9 million copies in circulation; over 13 million copies in circulation by December 2021; over 16 million copies in circulation by June 2022; over 18 million copies in circulation by January 2023; and over 22 million copies in circulation by February 2026.

In 2019, the manga was nominated for the 12th Manga Taishō and ranked second with 78 points; in 2020, it was nominated for the 13th award and ranked sixth with 54 points. In 2019, the series was nominated for the 65th Shogakukan Manga Award in the general category; it won the 67th award in the same category, along with Nigatsu no Shōsha, in 2022. It was nominated for the 44th Kodansha Manga Award in the general category in 2020. The manga was nominated for the 26th Tezuka Osamu Cultural Prize in 2022.

On Takarajimasha's Kono Manga ga Sugoi! list of best manga of 2019 for women readers, the series ranked second; it ranked fourth on the 2020 list; sixth on the 2021 list; and tenth on the 2022 list. The series ranked 24th on the 2019 "Book of the Year" list by Da Vinci magazine; it was fifth on the 2020 list; second on the 2021 list; fourth on the 2022 list; 11th on the 2023 list; and 26th on the 2025 list.

The live-action film debuted at first at the Japanese box office, earning over ¥850 million on its opening weekend. Within the first 31 days of its premiere, it earned over ¥3.76 billion, and ranked first at the Japanese box office for five consecutive weekends, becoming the first Japanese live-action film to do so since We Made A Beautiful Bouquet in 2021, a film also starring Suda. By December 2023, while still showing, it earned over ¥4.74 billion in Japan.
