= Animerica =

Monthly magazine published by Viz Media

- Volume 1 Issue #2 of Animerica (April 1993)
- Categories: Anime; Manga; Advertising
- Frequency: Monthly
- Circulation: 45,000 (2004)
- Publisher: Viz Media
- First issue: November 1992 #0
- Final issue: June 2005 #6
- Company: Viz Media
- Country: United States
- Based in: San Francisco, California
- Language: English
- Website: animerica-mag.com
- ISSN: 1067-0831

Animerica was a monthly magazine published by Viz Media containing news, feature articles, and reviews on manga, anime, and related media, as well as a section that serialized manga published by Viz.

== History ==
Animerica was introduced in 1992 with the release of a very low print preview issue (#0 November 1992). The first official issue followed in March 1993. With Viz's connections to Shogakukan, the magazine was one of the first professional-quality anime and manga-oriented magazine to be released in the United States. At the magazine's launch, it was co-edited by Seiji Horibuchi, Satoru Fujii, and Trish Ledoux.

In 1998, Viz introduced a related magazine, Animerica Extra, which was its first monthly manga anthology. This secondary magazine, which eventually came to focus exclusively on shōjo titles, was canceled in 2004.

To celebrate the magazine's ninth anniversary, Viz launched a redesign of the magazine starting with the November 2001 issue that included a new cover design, a new logo, and an increased focus on news, reviews, and Japanese trends. Fold-out posters were also added to every issue. During 2002 the magazine was published in a square-bound, full-colour format without a manga serial that had previously been included. By 2003, the magazine had also doubled its initial page count.

In April 2005, Viz announced that the magazine would be reformatted into two different free versions, and the monthly subscription version would be discontinued. The first version, similar to the original but with a lower page count, was advertising-sponsored and produced exclusively for and distributed at specific anime and manga conventions. The second version was a quarterly digest-sized magazine that focused more on content and had a wider range of content versus the convention version. Termed "magalogs" by Viz, these digest versions were distributed freely at Borders and Waldenbooks. Approximately 100 copies of the first issue of the free version of Animerica were sent to 1,000 Borders and Waldenbooks stores around the United States.

A third variety specifically for Best Buy stores was later added to the line up.

The last monthly issue of the original Animerica was released with a cover date of June 2005 (Volume 13, No. 6). Subscriptions to the original magazine were replaced with subscriptions to Viz's Shojo Beat manga anthology, which had been launched July 2005 to replace the aforementioned Animerica Extra.

=== Trademark and lawsuit ===
When Viz began publication of Animerica, it registered the name as a trademark. In 1997, a Japanese company named Redsun began using the domain name "animerica.com" to host an adult-oriented and hentai distribution website. Viz attempted to purchase the domain name from the company, but Redsun refused. Viz filed a lawsuit claiming the website infringed on its trademark. The court agreed that the website was causing confusion with Viz's publication, but that the confusion was primarily limited to American audiences. The court refused Viz's request that the site be shut down and its assets frozen. It did, however, require that Redsun put a disclaimer on its website and all advertising noting that it was not affiliated with the Animerica magazine nor with Viz Media and that it provide a link to Viz's existing official website for the magazine at "www.animerica-mag.com." In November 2004, Redsun's adult website closed. Viz claimed the name in 2005, and by October the site had been relaunched as the official website of the new Animerica magazine.

== Features ==
Each issue of the original Animerica included articles covering anime and manga releases in both the United States and Japan, interviews with industry professionals such as voice actors and directors, reviews of anime and manga series, and articles and reviews on related areas such as games, model kits, and music releases. They would also include a single chapter from a current Viz manga series. Over the course of the magazine's history, chapters from X, Area 88, Galaxy Express 999, One-Pound Gospel, and Urusei Yatsura appeared in it.

Final issues of the magazine still included articles on anime and manga releases, reviews of titles, and manga previews, but they were all shorter and more concise than the original. The new version had a much lower page count, leaving fewer articles in each issue.

== Circulation and reception ==
Animerica was one of the most popular anime and manga magazines in North America for nearly a decade. In July 2000, Animerica was named the Best English-language publication at the Society for the Promotion of Japanese Animation awards at Anime Expo. In 2004, the magazine had a circulation of 45,000, with 80% of its issues bought via newsstands rather than by subscription. This number was a drop from previous years, due to greater competition from other magazines like Newtype USA, resulting in Viz's changing its format.

== See also ==
- List of manga magazines published outside of Japan
