= Yumi Tamura =

Japanese manga artist

Yumi Tamura 田村由美
- Born: Wakayama, Japan
- Area: Manga artist
- Notable works: Basara; 7 Seeds; Don't Call It Mystery
- Awards: 1993 Shogakukan Manga Award for shōjo manga - Basara; 2007 Shogakukan Manga Award for shōjo manga - 7 Seeds; 2021 Shogakukan Manga Award for general manga - Don't Call It Mystery

Yumi Tamura (田村由美, Tamura Yumi; born September 5th in Wakayama Prefecture, Japan) is a Japanese manga artist.

Her debut short story, Ore-tachi no Zettai Jikan ("This is the Time for Us"), was published in 1983 in Bessatsu Shōjo Comic and received the 1983 Shogakukan Grand Prize for new artists. Since then, she has completed more than 50 compiled volumes of short stories and continuing series. Popular works such as Tomoe ga Yuku! ("There goes Tomoe") exemplify her work, but she made her reputation with the long-running shōjo action/adventure series Basara, for which she won the 1993 Shogakukan Manga Award for the shōjo category. Her series 7 Seeds, for which she won a second Shogakukan Manga Award for the shōjo category in 2007, ran in the anthology magazine Flowers in Japan. Chicago was her first series to be published in North America. In 2021, she won a third Shogakukan Manga Award for general manga for her latest series Don't Call It Mystery.

In addition to manga, she has published four novels with illustrations by herself, as well as doing character designs for Square's Super Famicom RPG Live A Live's Distant Future chapter, "The Mechanical Heart."

== Works ==
- Ore-tachi no Zettai Jikan (1983)
- Shinwa ni Natta Gogo (1986)
- 17 Nichime no Chopin (1987)
- Ano Natsu ga Owaru (1987)
- Tomoe ga Yuku! (1987–1990)
- Bishop no Wa (1990)
- Basara (1990–1998)
- Roppongi Shinjuu (1991)
- Boku ga Tenshi wo Unda Riyuu (1992)
- Madonna ni Tsugu (1992)
- Boku ga Boku wo Wasureta Riyuu (1993)
- X-Day (1993)
- Boku ga Santa ni Atta Riyuu (1994)
- Boku ga Gomi wo Suteta Riyuu (1995
- Megami ga Ochita Hi (1995)
- Hearts (1996)
- Toorima 1991 (1998)
- Wild Com. (1999)
- Hare Tokidoki Yami (1999)
- Odoru Kyoushitsu (1999)
- Ouji-kun (1999)
- Box Kei! (2000)
- Chicago (2000–2001)
- Boku ga Juuban Shoubusuru Wake (2001)
- 7 Seeds (2001-2017)
- Wangan Jungle (2002)
- Chotto Eiyuushite Mitai (2003)
- Bokura no Mura ni wa Mizuumi ga atta (2007)
- Tamura Yumi the Best Selection (2008)
- Neko Mix Genkitan Toraji (2008-ongoing)
- Don't Call It Mystery (2017–)
