= Dongzhi =

Twenty-second solar term of traditional Chinese lunisolar calendars and festival

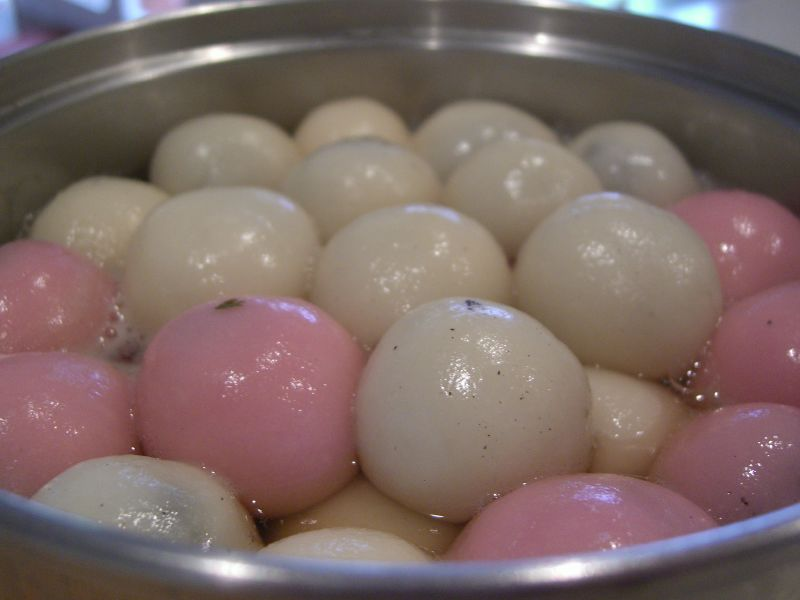
- Tangyuan, a traditional Dongzhi Festival food
- Observed by: Chinese people
- Type: Cultural
- Significance: to mark the winter solstice festival
- Observances: making and eating of tangyuan, ancestor worship
- Date: December solstice (between December 21 and December 23)
- Frequency: annual
- Related to: Winter solstice

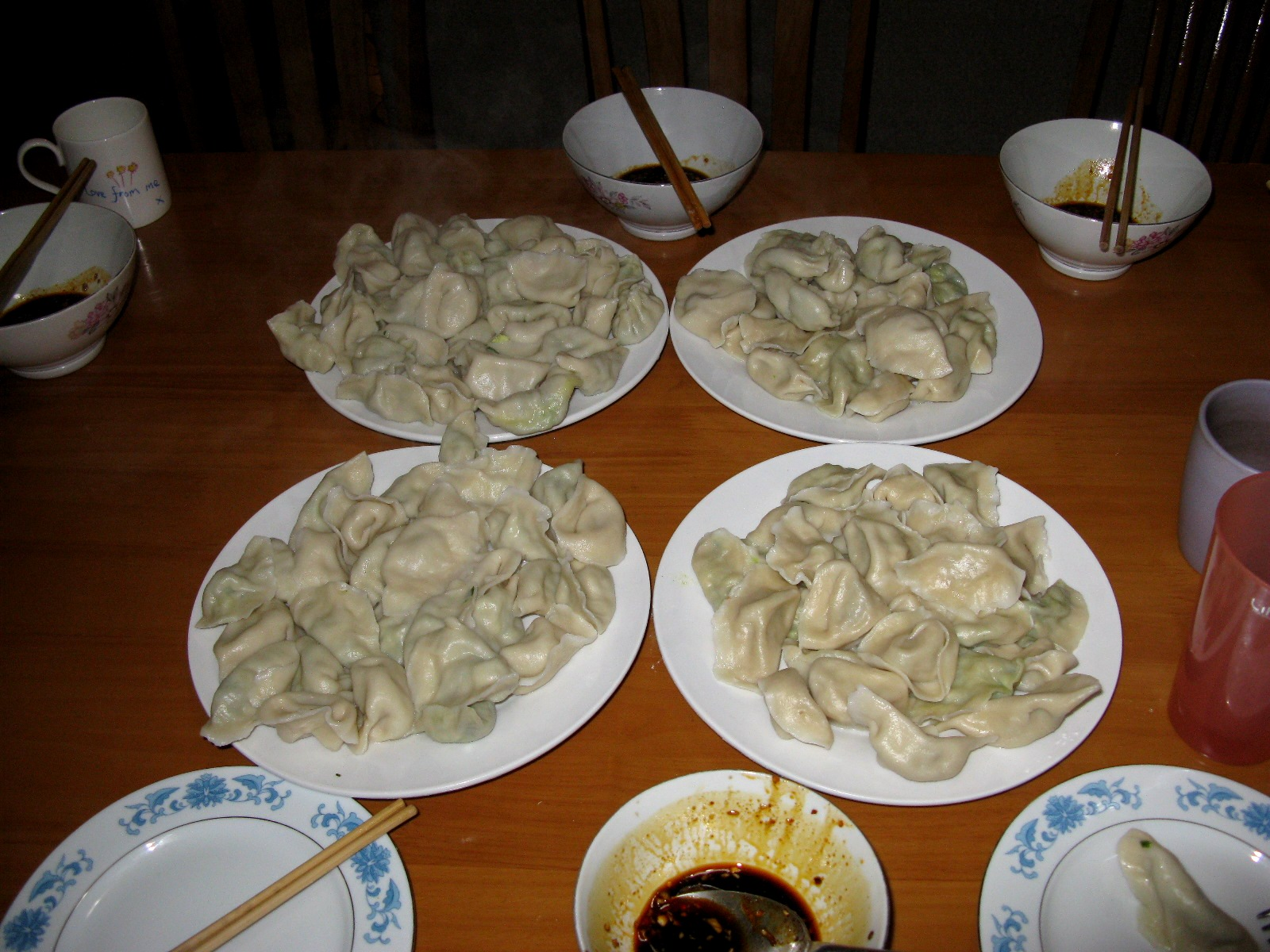
Dongzhi Festival dumplings

Dongzhi

Chinese name
- Chinese: 冬至
- Literal meaning: winter's extreme (i.e. winter solstice)
Transcriptions
Standard Mandarin
- Hanyu Pinyin: dōngzhì
- Bopomofo: ㄉㄨㄙ ㄓㄧˋ
- Yale Romanization: dūng-jr̀
Hakka
- Pha̍k-fa-sṳ: tûng-chṳ
Yue: Cantonese
- Yale Romanization: dūng ji
- Jyutping: dung^{1} zi^{3}
Southern Min
- Hokkien POJ: tong-chì / tang-chì
Eastern Min
- Fuzhou BUC: dĕ̤ng-cé

Alternative Chinese name
- Traditional Chinese: 冬節
- Simplified Chinese: 冬节
- Literal meaning: winter festival
Transcriptions
Standard Mandarin
- Hanyu Pinyin: Dōngjié
Hakka
- Pha̍k-fa-sṳ: Tûng-chiet
Southern Min
- Hokkien POJ: Tang-cheh or Tang-choeh
Eastern Min
- Fuzhou BUC: Dĕ̤ng-cáik

Vietnamese name
- Vietnamese alphabet: đông chí
- Chữ Hán: 冬至

Korean name
- Hangul: 동지
- Hanja: 冬至
Transcriptions
- Revised Romanization: dongji

Mongolian name
- Mongolian Cyrillic: өвлийн туйл
- Mongolian script: ᠡᠪᠦᠯ ᠦᠨ ᠲᠤᠢᠯ

Japanese name
- Kanji: 冬至
- Hiragana: とうじ
Transcriptions
- Romanization: tōji

Manchu name
- Manchu script: ᡨᡠᠸᡝᡵᡳ ᡨᡝᠨ
- Möllendorff: tuweri ten

Dongzhi (Chinese: 冬至; pinyin: dōngzhì), Tōji (Japanese), Dongji (Korean: 동지), Tunji (Okinawan), or Đông chí (Vietnamese) is the 22nd solar term of the Chinese calendar, and marks the winter solstice. The term begins when the Sun reaches the celestial longitude of 270° and ends when it reaches the longitude of 285°. In common usage, Dongzhi more often refers to the particular day when the Sun is exactly at the celestial longitude of 270°. In the Gregorian calendar, it usually begins around 21 December (22 December East Asia time) and ends around 5 January..

The Dongzhi Festival is observed by Chinese people during the solar term. The origins of this festival can be traced back to the philosophy of yin and yang, the lengthening days representing positive energy. The philosophical significance of this is symbolized by the I Ching hexagram fu (Chinese: 復; 'returning'). Also, it is the day with the shortest daylight, and longest night.

== Observances ==
=== China ===
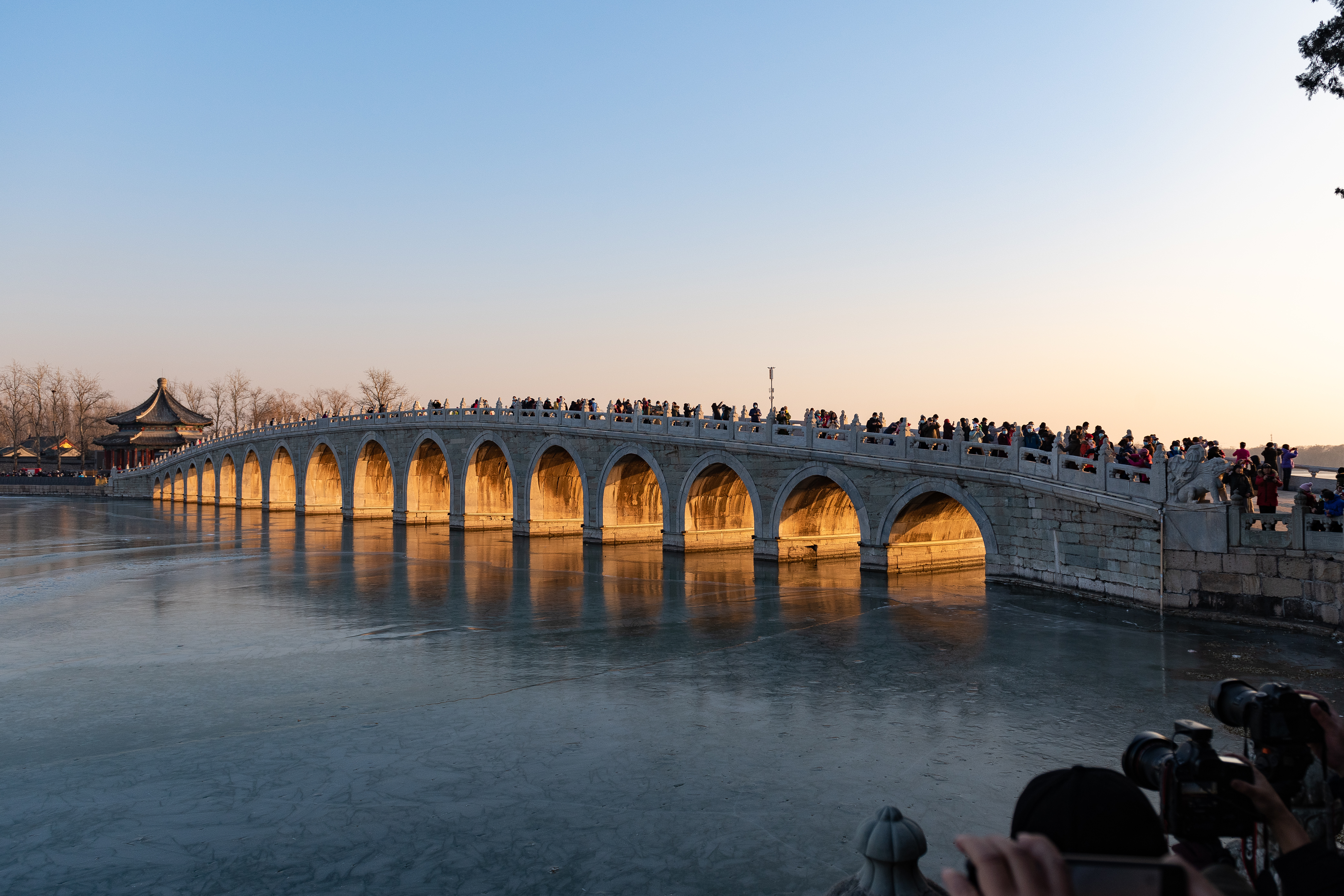
Sunlight directed through the 17 arches of Seventeen Arch Bridge, Summer Palace, Beijing around winter solstice

Dongzhi celebrates the winter solstice, usually around December 21 to 23, and is observed on the longest night of the year. Dongzhi symbolizes the victory of light over darkness as days will start to grow longer, representing yang according to the Chinese philosophy of yin and yang. It was also believed by some that it was the day the Kitchen God went to heaven to report to the Jade Emperor the conduct of a family.

The festival was first celebrated by the Chinese people during the Zhou dynasty (1045 BCE–256 BCE) and declared an official celebration during the Han dynasty (206 BCE–220 CE). The Han people would take a break from work to celebrate with their families. They would hold heaven worshipping as well as honoring their ancestors by burning joss paper at their ancestral shrines to show gratitude. In ancient times, the day was also known as the "festival of extreme length (traditional Chinese: 長至節; simplified Chinese: 长至节; pinyin: Cháng Zhì Jié) as the sun's extreme position lengthens shadows. It was traditionally a very important holiday, comparable to Chinese New Year.

The Chinese people still celebrate certain practices during the Dongzhi festival, such as the union of family. In Hong Kong, many businesses let employees off early to spend time with their families on this day, while in some areas shops close for the holiday. In Suzhou, it is traditional to light incense at dawn.

The Dongzhi Festival has historically been associated with various agricultural activities in China, particularly in rural areas. As the festival represents the winter solstice, it is a crucial time to harvest winter crops, such as wheat, barley, and radishes. It is also an important time to pay respect to certain livestock and feed these animals special meals to celebrate the occasion.

Traditionally, the Dongzhi Festival is a time for families to eat together. One activity that occurs during these gatherings (especially in the Asia and in Overseas Asian communities) is the making and eating of tangyuan (湯圓) or balls of glutinous rice, which symbolize reunion as it sounds similar to 團圓 (tuányuán; 'reunion'). Tangyuan are usually white, but are sometimes colored. Each family member receives at least one large tangyuan in addition to several small ones. The tangyuan are cooked in a sweet soup or savory broth. It is also often served with jiuniang, a mildly alcoholic, unfiltered rice wine containing whole grains of glutinous rice (and often also sweet osmanthus flowers). Many people take some of the tangyuan that have been used as offerings and stick them on the back of the door or on windows and tables and other pieces of furniture. These "empowered" tangyuan serve as protective talismans to keep evil spirits away from children.

People typically eat Winter Solstice dumplings (Chinese: 冬至糰; pinyin: dōngzhìtuán), also symbolizing reunion. This custom is said to have been started by the celebrated physician Zhang Zhongjing during the Han dynasty. One cold winter's day, he noticed that the poor were afflicted with chilblains on their ears. Moved to pity, he ordered his apprentices to make dumplings with lamb and other ingredients, and distribute them among the poor to keep them warm and prevent their ears from getting chilblains. Since the dumplings were shaped like ears, Zhang named the dish 祛寒嬌耳湯 (qùhán jiāoěr tāng; 'soup that dispels cold ears'). From that time on, it has been a tradition to eat dumplings on the day of Dongzhi. Dumplings are not only eaten by the family, but also shared with friends and relatives as a blessing. The dumplings may be molded into the shapes of animals such as dogs and cats. Common superstitions include that married people should leave two uneaten to have their wishes come true, and a single person should leave one for an auspicious year. According to one tradition, the dumplings should be eaten by an even number of people for good luck.

Old traditions also require people with the same surname or from the same clan to gather at their ancestral temples to worship on this day. There is always a grand reunion dinner following the sacrificial ceremony.

Other traditional foods include hot pot and wontons. Shuijiao dumplings are popular in northern China.

The festive food is also a reminder that celebrators are now a year older and should behave better in the coming year. Even today, many Chinese around the world, especially the elderly, still insist that one is "a year older" right after the Dongzhi celebration instead of waiting for the Chinese New Year.

=== Korea ===
In Korea, the winter solstice is also called the "Small Seol," and there is a custom of celebrating the day. People make porridge with red beans known as patjuk (팥죽) and round rice cakes (새알심 saealsim) with sticky rice. In the past, red bean porridge soup was sprayed on walls or doors because it was said to ward off bad ghosts. In addition, there was a custom in the early days of the Goryeo and Joseon Period in which people in financial difficulty settled all their debts and enjoyed the day.

=== Taiwan ===
In Taiwan, like in the culturally related province of Fujian, Dongzhi is a day for spending time with families and making offerings to ancestors. It is also a tradition for Taiwanese to eat tangyuan on this day. They also use the festive food as an offering dish to worship the ancestors.

As well as following some of the customs practiced on mainland China, the people of Taiwan have a unique custom of offering nine-layer cakes as a ceremonial sacrifice to worship their ancestors. These cakes are made using glutinous rice flour in the shape of a chicken, duck, tortoise, pig, cow, or sheep, and then steamed in different layers of a pot. The animals signify auspiciousness in Chinese tradition.

Many people take invigorating tonic foods during this particular winter festival. To the Taiwanese, winter is a time when most physical activities should be limited and you should eat well to nourish your body. This practice follows the habits shown by many animals which follow the law of nature and hibernate throughout winter months to rejuvenate and to preserve life. In order to fight cold temperatures, it is necessary to eat more fatty and meaty foods during winter when your body can better absorb the rich and nutritional foods at this time due to a slower metabolic rate.

Since Dongzhi is the "extreme of winter", Taiwanese regard it as the best time of the year to take tonic foods. Some of the most widely popular winter tonic foods enjoyed by Taiwanese to fight cold and strengthen the body's resistance are mutton hot pot and ginger duck hot pot. Other foods like chicken, pork, and abalone are also common ingredients used in making tonic foods with nurturing herbs such as ginseng, deer horn, and the fungus cordyceps.

== Pentads ==
Each solar term is divided into three pentads which are typically named after seasonal natural events. The pentads during Dongzhi are:

- 蚯蚓結, 'Earthworms form knots', referring to the hibernation of earthworms.
- 麋角解, 'Deer shed their antlers'
- 水泉動, 'Spring water moves'

== Date and time ==
Date and Time of Dongzhi (at UTC+08)
Year	Begin	End
丙申	2016-12-21 18:44	2017-01-05 11:56
丁酉	2017-12-22 00:28	2018-01-05 17:49
戊戌	2018-12-22 06:22	2019-01-05 23:38
己亥	2019-12-22 12:19	2020-01-06 05:30
庚子	2020-12-21 18:02	2021-01-05 11:23
辛丑	2021-12-21 23:59	2022-01-05 17:14
壬寅	2022-12-22 05:48	2023-01-05 23:04
癸卯	2023-12-22 11:27	2024-01-06 04:49
甲辰	2024-12-21 17:20	2025-01-05 10:32
乙巳	2025-12-21 23:03	2026-01-05 16:23
丙午	2026-12-22 04:50	2027-01-05 22:10
丁未	2027-12-22 10:42	2028-01-06 03:54
戊申	2028-12-21 16:20	2029-01-05 09:42
己酉	2029-12-21 22:14	2030-01-05 15:30
庚戌	2030-12-22 04:09	2031-01-05 21:23
辛亥	2031-12-22 09:55	2032-01-06 03:16
壬子	2032-12-21 15:56	2033-01-05 09:08
癸丑	2033-12-21 21:45	2034-01-05 15:04
甲寅	2034-12-22 03:33	2035-01-05 20:55
乙卯	2035-12-22 09:30	2036-01-06 02:43
丙辰	2036-12-21 15:12	2037-01-05 08:34

== See also ==
- Winter solstice
- List of Buddhist festivals
- List of festivals in China
- List of festivals in Japan
- List of Korean traditional festivals
- List of traditional festivals in Vietnam
- Solstice
- Xiazhi (Chinese summer solstice festival)
- Yaldā Night (similar festival in Persian culture)

Preceded by Daxue (大雪)	Solar term (節氣)	Succeeded by Xiaohan (小寒)
