= Nurhaliza Mohamath =

American restauranteur and food writer

Nurhaliza Mohamath (Malay: نورهاليزا موهاماث) is an American restauranteur and food writer, based in Seattle.

== Early life and education ==
Mohamath was born in Saigon, Vietnam to a Cham family, and immigrated to the US at age two. She was raised in the south end of Seattle, Washington.

== Career ==
In March 2022, Mohamath opened Salima Specialties, a Halal pan-Asian restaurant in Seattle serving Cham cuisine.

In 2025, Mohamath was awarded the Tatsuo Nakata Leadership Award by International Examiner, a monthly Asian American newspaper and media nonprofit organization based in Seattle.

In 2026, Mohamath published My Cham Tongue, a cookbook focused on Cham cuisine. The book includes a history of the Cham ethnic group, and 10 recipes for Cham food. Recipes include Poo Kha Ra—spiced beef porridge, and Kureng Magik Kalu—black pepper stew.

== Publications ==
- My Cham Tongue (2026)
