= List of traditional festivals in Vietnam =

Traditional festivals in Vietnam include observances in the Vietnamese, Cham, and Khmer calendars. Those in the Vietnamese calendar include both local and nationwide festivals.

== Traditional festivals in the Vietnamese calendar ==
=== Famous local festivals ===
Name Festival	Note	Place
Cửa Ông Temple Festival	2nd day of 1st lunar month	Cửa Ông Temple, Cẩm Phả, Quảng Ninh province
Đống Đa Festival	5th day of 1st lunar month	Đống Đa district, Hanoi
Liễu Đôi wrestle Festival	5th day to 10th day of 1st lunar month	Liễu Đôi village, Liêm Túc commune, Thanh Liêm district, Hà Nam province
Hương Temple Festival	6th day of 1st lunar month- last day of 3rd lunar month	Hương Sơn commune, Mỹ Đức district, Hanoi
Cổ Loa Temple Festival	6th day to 16th day of 1st lunar month	Cổ Loa commune, Đông Anh district, Hanoi
Ba Bể Lake Festival	9th day and 10th day of 1st lunar month	Ba Bể Lake, Ba Bể district, Bắc Kạn province
Triều Khúc village Festival	9th day to 11th day of 1st lunar month	Triều Khúc village, Hanoi
Sình village Festival	10th day of 1st lunar month	Sình village, Phú Mậu commune, Phú Vang district, Huế
Yên Tử Festival	10th day of 1st lunar month to the last day of 3rd lunar month	Yên Tử Mountain, Thượng Yên Công commune, Uông Bí, Quảng Ninh province
Lim Festival	13th day of 1st lunar month	Lũng Giang commune, Tiên Sơn district, Bắc Ninh province
Bà Thiên Hậu Temple Festival	13th day and 15th day of 1st lunar month	Lái Thiêu commune, Thủ Dầu Một, Bình Dương province
Thượng temple Festival	15th day of 1st lunar month	Lào Cai province
Bà Đen Mountain Festival	18th day and 19th day of 1st lunar month	Black Virgin Mountain, Tây Ninh province
Đồng Nhân temple Festival	3rd day to 6th day of 2nd lunar month	Hai Bà Trưng district, Hanoi
Phương Viên festival	12th day to 14th day of 2nd lunar month	Vạng village, Song Phương commune, Hoài Đức district, Hanoi
Cuông temple Festival	14th day to 16th day of 2nd lunar month	Diễn An commune, Diễn Châu district, Nghệ An province
Quán Thế Âm Festival	18th day to 20th day of 2nd lunar month	Marble Mountains, Da Nang
Central Highland Elephant Racing	3rd lunar month	Đôn village, Đắk Lắk province
Phủ Dày Festival	3rd day to 8th day of 3rd lunar month	Kim Thái commune, Vụ Bản district, Nam Định province
Thầy Temple Festival	4th day to 7th day of 3rd lunar month	Sài Sơn commune, Quốc Oai district, Hanoi
Trường Yên Festival	10th day of 3rd lunar month	Hoa Lư, Ninh Bình province
Chử Đồng Tử Temple Festival	10th day to 12th day of 3rd lunar month	Đa Hoà village, Châu Giang district, Hưng Yên province
Đô Temple Festival	15th day of 3rd lunar month	Đình Bảng village, Từ Sơn district, Bắc Ninh province
Lệ Mật village Festival	23rd day of 3rd lunar month	Lệ Mật village, Việt Hưng commune, Gia Lâm district, Hanoi
Gióng Festival	9th day of 4th lunar month	Hanoi
Bà Chúa Xứ Festival	23rd day to 25th day of 4th lunar month	Sam mountain, Châu Đốc city, An Giang province
Đồ Sơn buffalo fight Festival	9th day of 8th lunar month	Đồ Sơn district, Haiphong
Kiếp Bạc Temple Festival	16th day to 20th day of 8th lunar month	Lê Lợi commune, Chí Linh district, Hải Dương city, Hải Dương province
Keo Temple Festival	13th day to 15th of 9th lunar month	Keo Temple, Duy Nhất commune, Vũ Thư district, Thái Bình province

=== Nationwide festivals ===
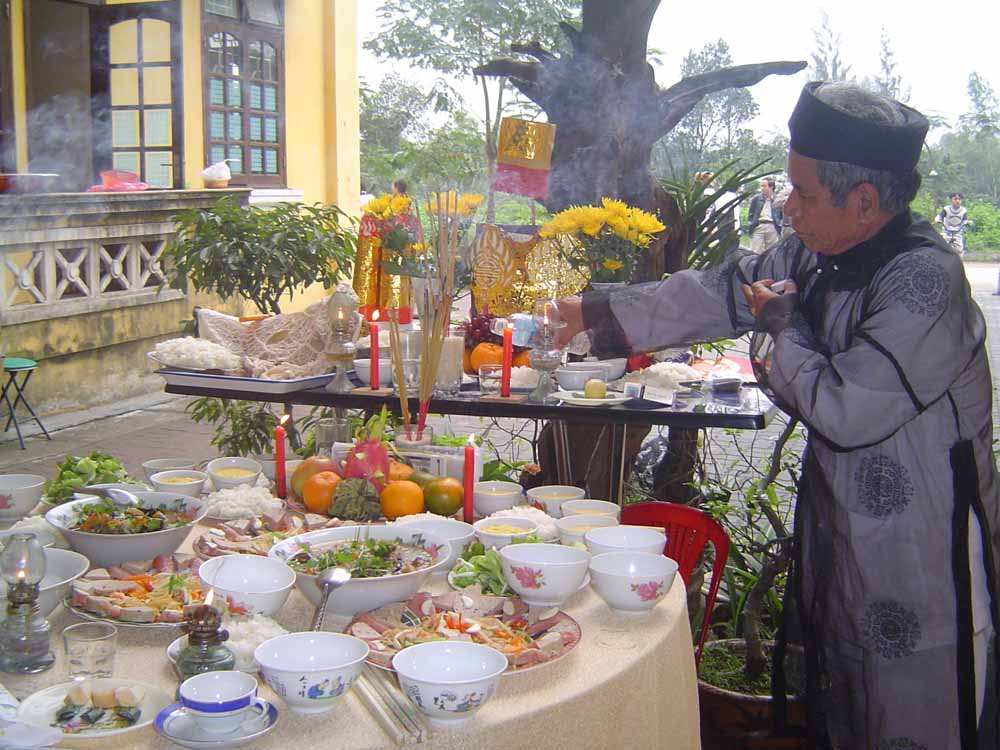
Tất Niên offering during Tết

Name festival	Note
Tết Nguyên Đán	Last day of previous year to 5th day of 1st lunar month
Tết Nguyên Tiêu	14th to midnight on the 15th of 1st lunar month
Cold Food Festival	3rd day of the 3rd lunar month
Hùng Kings' Festival	10th day of 3rd lunar month
Tết Đoan Ngọ	5th day of the 5th lunar month
Ghost Festival	2nd to 15th day of the 7th lunar month
Tết Trung Thu	The night of the 14th to 15th day of the 8th lunar month

== Traditional festivals in the Cham calendar ==
=== 7th month ===
- 7th month in Cham calendar: Kate Festival of Champa ethnic minority.

== Traditional festivals in the Khmer calendar ==
- Chol Chnam Thmey, Cambodian New Year
- Okomboc fullmoon in Sóc Trăng province

== Modern festivals ==
- Huế Festival, Huế city.
- Flower Festival, Đà Lạt city, Lâm Đồng province.
- August, Nha Trang- Rendevouz Festival, Nha Trang city, Khánh Hòa province.
