= Cham festival =

Vietnamese festivals in the Champa region

The Cham festivals of the Champa region in the Vietnam portion of southeast Asia include agricultural festivals, religious festivals, dancing festivals, chancel festivals and tower festivals. All these are part of their ethnic and cultural heritage.

== Agriculture festivals ==
- Padang paday tuan
- Lew po Bhùm
- Padai dôk titan
- Lew Yang trun yuak
- Da a patai tagok lan
- Palau sak
- Rija harei
- Rija dayuap
- Cuh Yang Apui: Fire God worshiping festival
- Gay bhong
- Kap kraung halau
- Ngak kabau Yang batau: Buffalo worshiping festival

== Cham New Year ==
- Rija Nukan

== Chancel festivals ==
- Suk yương
- Ramưwan

== Dancing festivals ==
- Rija nưgar
- Rija harei
- Rija dauap
- Rija praung

== Harvest festival ==
- Katê

== Religious festivals ==
- Puis
- Payak

== Tower festivals ==
- Pơh băng Yang: tower gate opening festival
- Yuơr Yang
- Chabun: Homeland Female God worshiping festival
