= Chams =

Austronesian ethnic group in Southeast Asia

Cham
ꨂꨣꩃ ꨌꩌꨛꨩ اوراڠ چمڤا Urang Campa
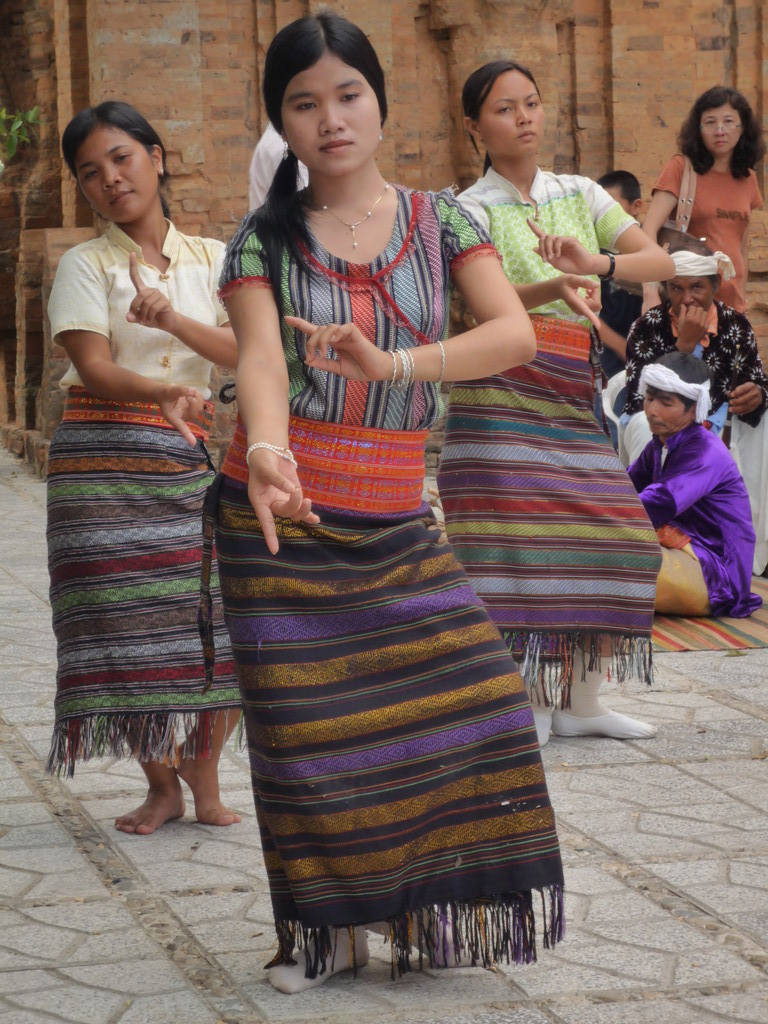
- Cham women performing a traditional dance in Nha Trang, Vietnam

Total population
- c. 822,648

Regions with significant populations
- Cambodia: 600,000
- Vietnam: 178,948
- Thailand: 1,000–4,000
- United States: 3,000
- France: 1,000
- Laos: 700

Languages
- Cham, Tsat, Haroi, Vietnamese, Khmer, Malay

Religion
- Predominantly Sunni Islam (Cambodia, Malaysia, Thailand, southern Vietnam, and Hainan, China); Minorities of Kan Imam San Islam, Bani Islam and Hinduism (central Vietnam)

Related ethnic groups
- Utsuls and other Austronesian peoples (especially Jarai, Rade, Acehnese)

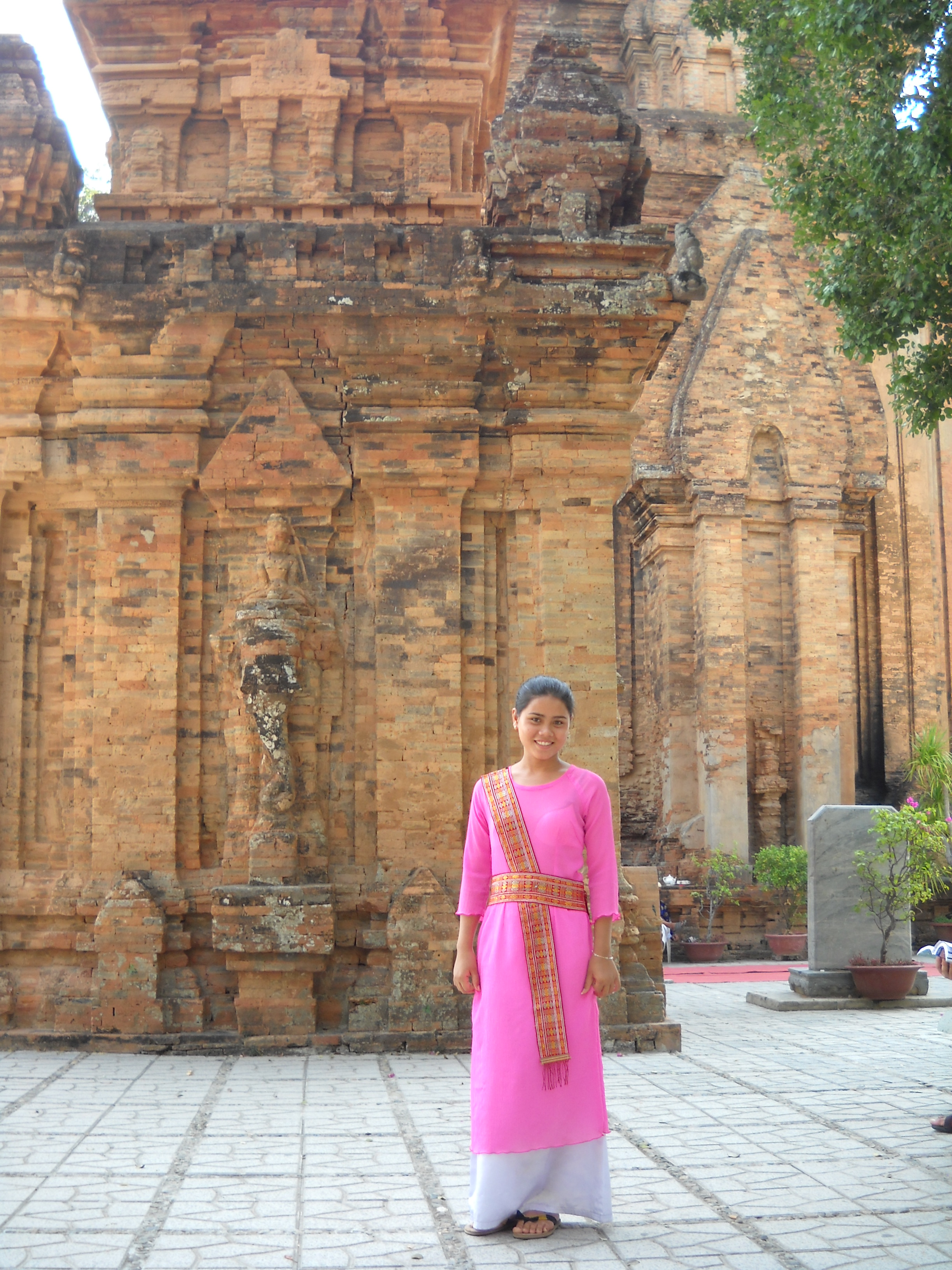
Traditional Cham women's clothes

The Chams (Cham: ꨌꩌ, چام, cam), or Champa people (ꨂꨣꩃ ꨌꩌꨛꨩ, اوراڠ چمڤا, Urang Campa; Vietnamese: Người Chăm or Người Chàm; Khmer: ជនជាតិចាម, Chônchéatĕ Cham), are an Austronesian ethnic group in Southeast Asia and are the original inhabitants of central Vietnam and coastal Cambodia before the arrival of the Cambodians and Vietnamese, during the expansion of the Khmer Empire (802–1431) and the Vietnamese conquest of Champa (11th–19th century).

From the 2nd century, the Chams founded Champa, a collection of independent Hindu-Buddhist principalities in what is now central and southern Vietnam. By the 17th century, Champa became an Islamic sultanate. Today, the Cham people are largely Muslim, with a minority following Hinduism, both formed the indigenous Muslim and Hindu population in both Cambodia and Vietnam. Despite their adherence to Islam, the Cham people still retain their ancestral practice of matriarchy in family and inheritance.

The Cham people speak Cham and Tsat (the latter is spoken by the Utsuls, a Cham subgroup on China's Hainan Island), the two Chamic languages from the Malayo-Polynesian branch of the Austronesian family. The Cham people were one among several ethnic groups that were primarily targeted by the Khmer Rouge's ethnic cleansing campaign during the Cambodian genocide (1975–1979).

== History ==
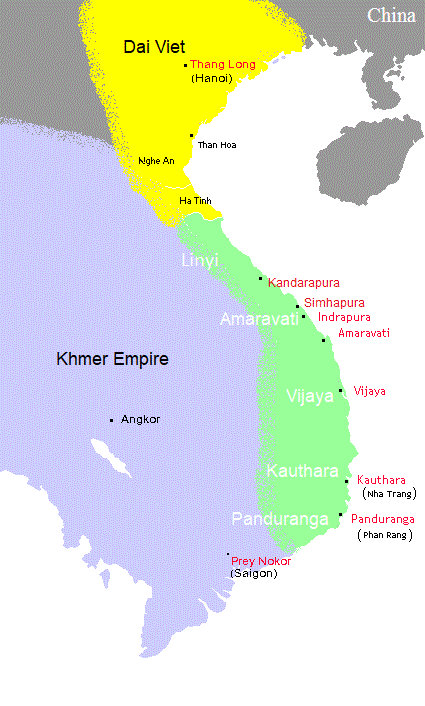
Historical extent of the Kingdom of Champa (in green) around 1100 CE

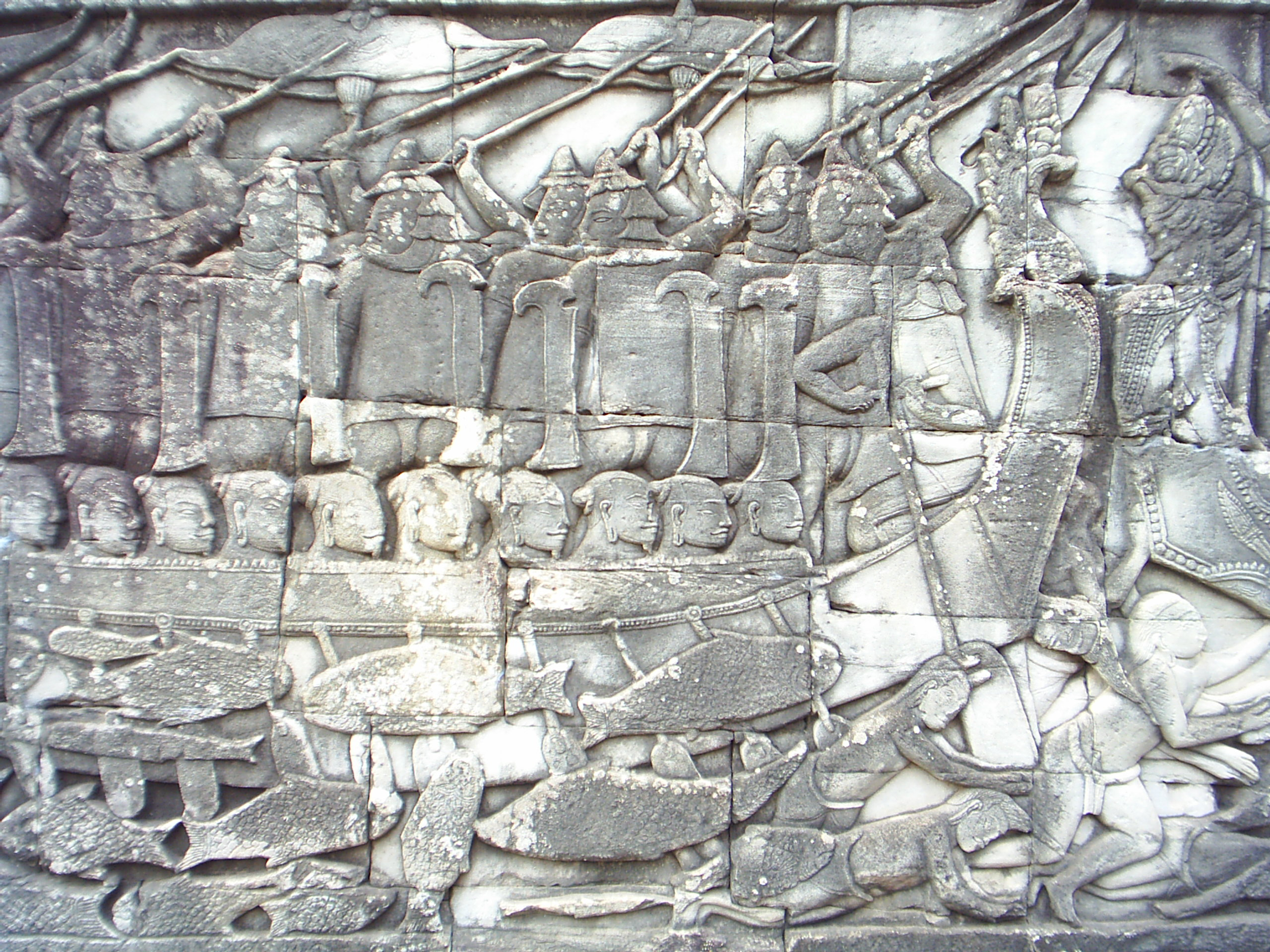
Depiction of Cham naval soldiers fighting against the Khmer, stone relief at the Bayon

For a long time, researchers believed that the Chams had arrived by sea in the first millennium BC from Sumatra, Borneo and the Malay Peninsula, eventually settling in central modern Vietnam.

The original Chams are therefore the likely heirs of Austronesian navigators from Taiwan and Borneo, whose main activities are commerce, transport and perhaps also piracy. Austronesian Chamic peoples might have migrated into present-day Central Vietnam around 3 kya to 2.5 kya (1,000 to 500 BC). With having formed a thalassocracy leaving traces in written sources, they invested the ports at the start of important trade routes linking India, China and Indonesian islands. Historians are now no longer disputing the association of Sa Huynh culture (1000 BC–200 AD) with the ancestors of the Cham people and other Chamic-speaking groups.

Patterns and chronology of migration remain debated and it is assumed that the Cham people, the only Austronesian ethnic group originated from South Asia, arrived later in peninsular Southeast Asia via Borneo. Mainland Southeast Asia had been populated on land routes by members of the Austroasiatic language family, such as the Mon people and the Khmer people around 5,000 years ago. The Chams were accomplished Austronesian seafarers that from centuries populated and soon dominated maritime Southeast Asia. Earliest known records of Cham presence in Indochina date back to the second century CE. Population centers were located on the river outlets along the coast. As they controlled the import/export trade of continental Southeast Asia, they enjoyed a prosperous maritime economy.

Cham folklore includes a creation myth in which the founder of the Cham people was a certain Lady Po Nagar. According to Cham mythology, Lady Po Nagar was born out of sea foam and clouds in the sky. However, in Vietnamese mythology, which adopted the goddess after taking over the Champa kingdom, her name is Thiên Y A Na and she instead came from a humble peasant home somewhere in the Dai An Mountains, Khánh Hòa Province, spirits assisted her as she travelled to China on a floating log of sandalwood where she married a man of royalty and had two children. She eventually returned to Champa "did many good deeds in helping the sick and the poor" and "a temple was erected in her honor".

=== Early history ===
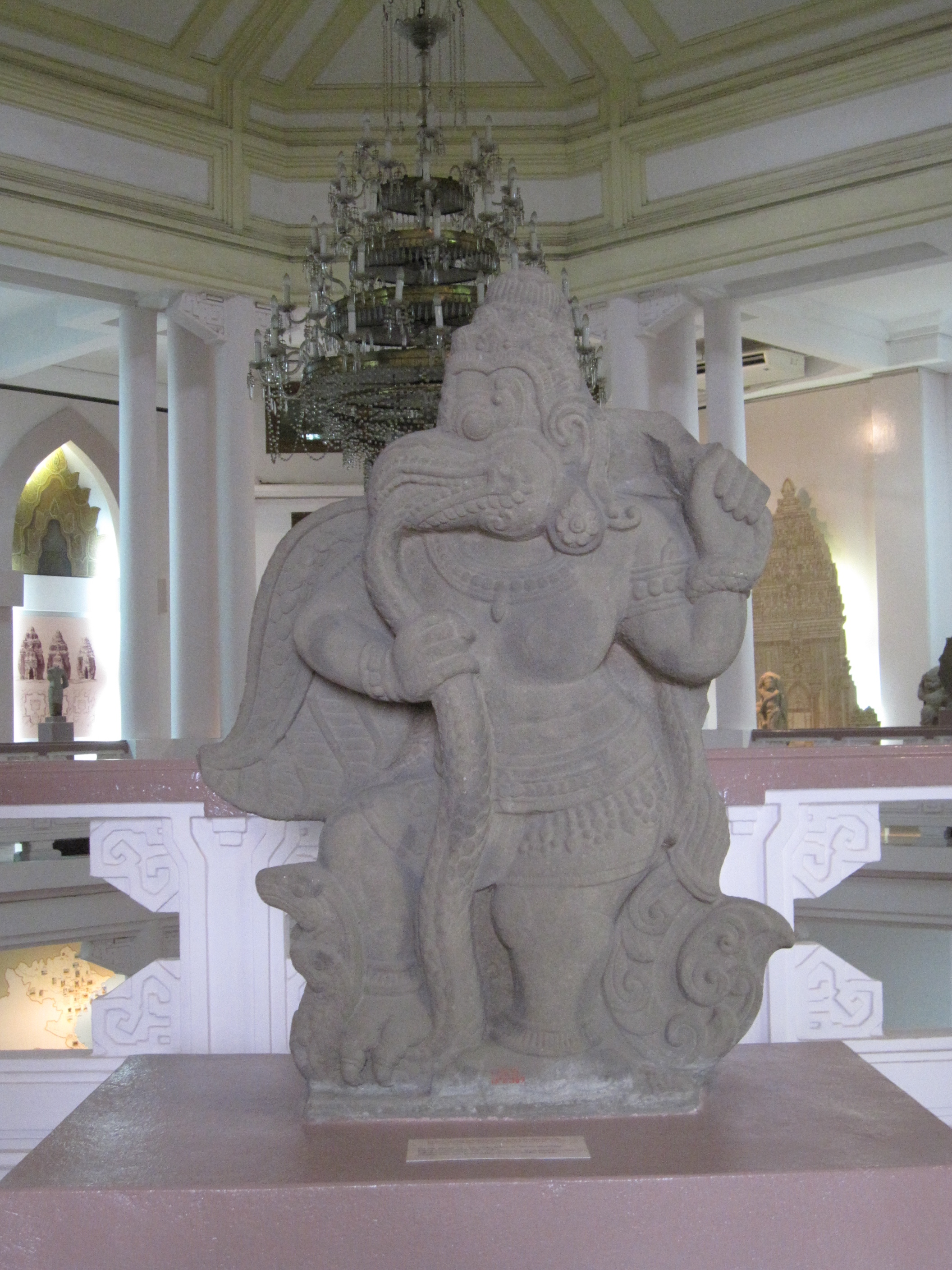
The Chams decorated their temples with stone reliefs depicting the gods such as Garuda fighting the nāga (12th-13th century CE)

Like countless other political entities of Southeast Asia, the Champa principalities underwent the process of Indianization since the early common era as a result of centuries of socio-economic interaction adopted and introduced cultural and institutional elements of India. From the 8th century onward, Muslims from such regions as Gujarat began to increasingly appear in trade and shipping of India. Islamic ideas became a part of the vast tide of exchange, treading the same path as Hinduism and Buddhism centuries before. Cham people picked up these ideas by the 11th century. This can be seen in the architecture of Cham temples, which shares similarities with one of the Angkor temples. Ad-Dimashqi writes in 1325, "the country of Champa... is inhabited by Muslims and idolaters. The Muslim religion came there during the time of Caliph Uthman... and Ali, many Muslims who were expelled by the Umayyads and by Hajjaj, fled there".

The Daoyi Zhilüe records that at Cham ports, Cham women were often married to Chinese merchants, who frequently came back to them after trading voyages. A Chinese merchant from Quanzhou, Wang Yuanmao, traded extensively with Champa and married a Cham princess.

In the 12th century, the Chams fought a series of wars with the Khmer Empire to the west. In 1177, the Chams and their allies launched an attack from the lake Tonlé Sap and managed to sack the Khmer capital of Angkor. In 1181, however, they were defeated by the Khmer King Jayavarman VII.

=== Encounter with Islam ===
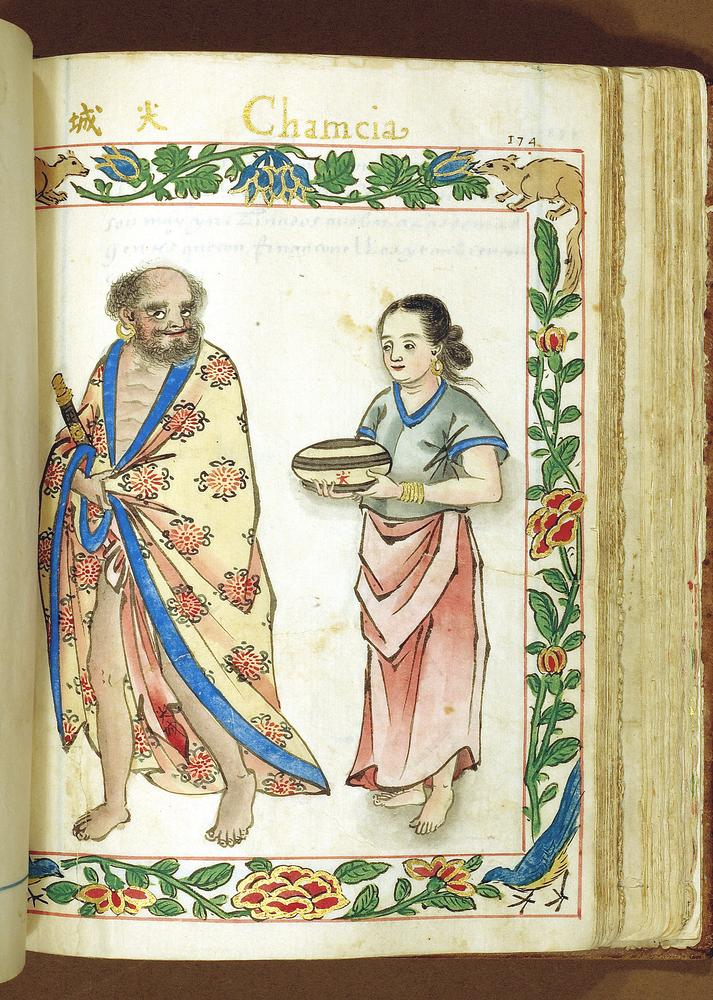
Depiction of Cham people in the Boxer Codex from 1590

Islam first arrived in Champa around the ninth century; however, it did not become significant among the Cham people until after the eleventh century.

Chams who migrated to Sulu were Orang Dampuan. Champa and Sulu engaged in commerce with each other which resulted in merchant Chams settling in Sulu where they were known as Orang Dampuan from the 10th-13th centuries. The Orang Dampuan were slaughtered by envious native Sulu Buranuns due to the wealth of the Orang Dampuan. The Buranun were then subjected to retaliatory slaughter by the Orang Dampuan. Harmonious commerce between Sulu and the Orang Dampuan was later restored. The Yakans were descendants of the Taguima-based Orang Dampuan who came to Sulu from Champa. Sulu received civilisation in its Indic form from the Orang Dampuan.

A number of Chams also fled across the sea to the Malay Peninsula and as early as the 15th century, a Cham colony was established in Malacca. The Chams encountered Sunni Islam there as the Malacca Sultanate was officially Muslim since 1414. The King of Champa then became an ally of the Johor Sultanate; in 1594, Champa sent its military forces to fight alongside Johor against the Portuguese occupation of Malacca. Between 1607 and 1676, one of the Champa kings converted to Islam and it became a dominant feature of Cham society. The Chams also adopted the Jawi alphabet.

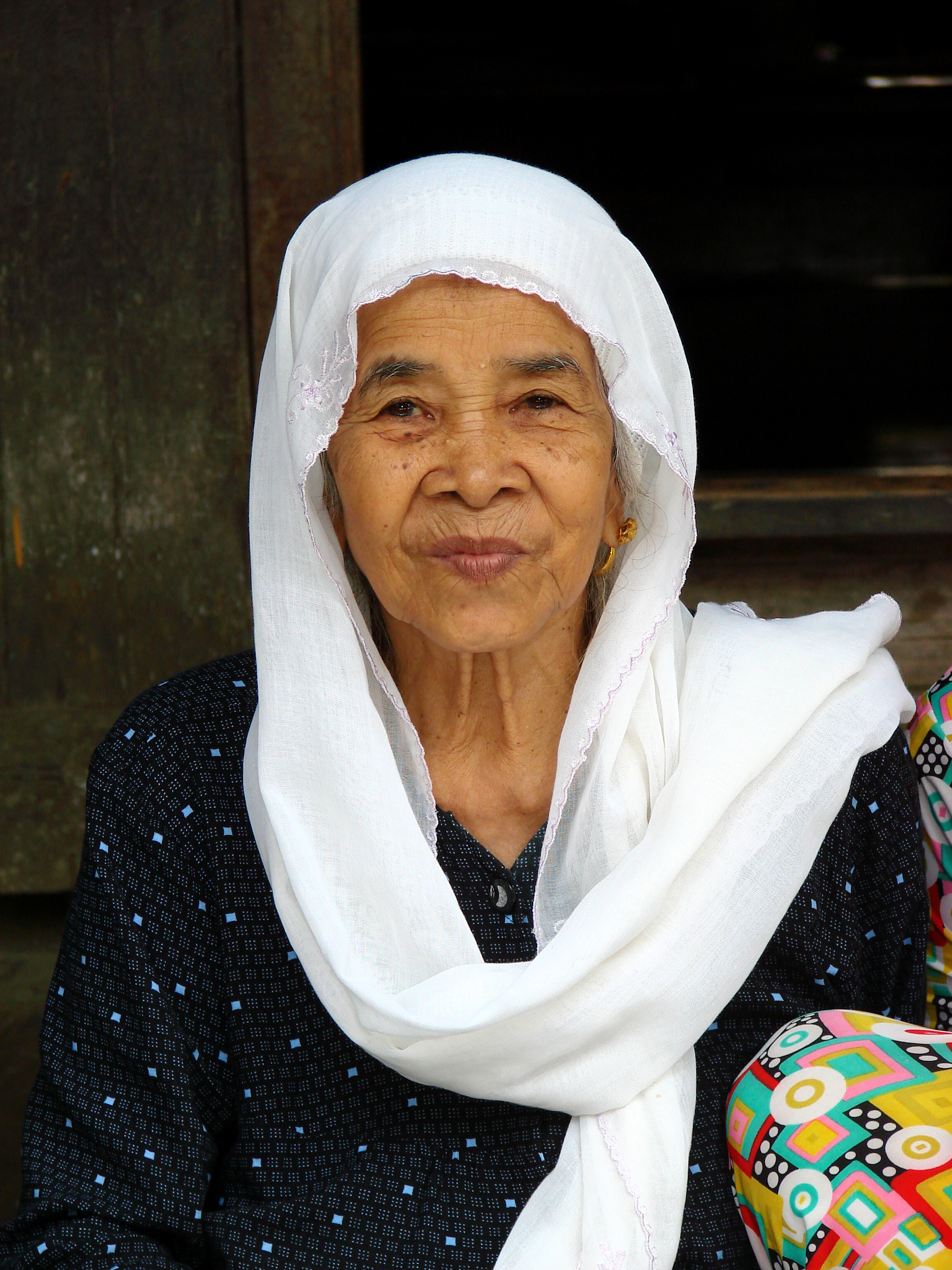
A Cham Muslim woman in Châu Đốc, Vietnam

Historical records in Indonesia showed the influence of Queen Dwarawati, a Muslim princess from the kingdom of Champa, toward her husband, Kertawijaya, the Seventh King of Majapahit Empire, so that the royal family of the Majapahit Empire eventually converted to Islam, which finally led to the conversion to Islam of the entire region. Chams Princess tomb can be found in Trowulan, the site of the capital of the Majapahit Empire. In Babad Tanah Jawi, it is said that the king of Brawijaya V has a wife named Dewi Anarawati (or Dewi Dwarawati), a Muslim daughter of the King of Champa (Chams). Chams had trade and close cultural ties with the maritime kingdom of Srivijaya in the Malay Archipelago.

Another significant figure from Champa in the history of Islam in Indonesia is Raden Rakhmat (Prince Rahmat) who's also known as Sunan Ampel, one of Wali Sanga (Nine Saints), who spread Islam in Java. He is considered as a focal point of the Wali Sanga, because several of them were actually his descendants and/or his students. His father is Maulana Malik Ibrahim also known as Ibrahim as-Samarkandy ("Ibrahim Asmarakandi" to Javanese ears), and his mother is Dewi Candrawulan, a princess of Champa who's also the sister of Queen Dwarawati. Sunan Ampel was born in Champa in 1401 CE. He came to Java in 1443 CE, in order to visit his aunt Queen Dwarawati, a princess of Champa who married to Kertawijaya (Brawijaya V), the King of Majapahit Empire. Local legend says that he built the Great Mosque of Demak (Masjid Agung Demak) in 1479 CE, but other legends attribute that work to Sunan Kalijaga. Sunan Ampel died in Demak in 1481 CE, but is buried in Ampel Mosque at Surabaya, East Java.

Recent scholarship, however, has shown that widespread conversion to Islam came much later. Poorly studied artefacts such as Islamic graves (which simply could have been ships' ballast) have been reexamined to show that they were, in fact, Tunisian and not Cham. Poorly conducted linguistic research attempting to link vocabulary to Arabic has been debunked as well. Rather, there is no sound evidence for widespread conversion to Islam until the 16th century.

=== Wars with the Vietnamese ===
Between the rise of the Khmer Empire around 800 and the Vietnamese's territorial expansion southwards from Jiaozhi and, later, Đại Việt, Champa began to shrink. At a disadvantage against Dai Viet's army of 300,000 troops, the Cham army of 100,000 were overwhelmed. In the Cham–Vietnamese War (1471), Champa suffered serious defeats at the hands of the Vietnamese, in which 120,000 people were either captured or killed, and the kingdom was reduced to a small enclave near Nha Trang with many Chams fleeing to Cambodia. Champa was no longer a threat to Vietnam, and some were even enslaved by their victors.

The Chams were matrilineal and inheritance passed through the mother. Because of this, in 1499 the Vietnamese enacted a law banning marriage between Cham women and Vietnamese men, regardless of class.(Tạ 1988, p. 137) The Vietnamese also issued instructions in the capital to kill all Chams within the vicinity. More attacks by the Vietnamese continued and in 1693 the Champa Kingdom's territory was integrated as part of Vietnamese territory.

The trade in Vietnamese ceramics was damaged due to the plummet in trade by Cham merchants after the Vietnamese invasion. Vietnam's export of ceramics was also damaged by its internal civil war, the Portuguese and Spanish entry into the region and the Portuguese conquest of Malacca which caused an upset in the trading system, while the carracks ships in the Malacca to Macao trade run by the Portuguese docked at Brunei due to good relations between the Portuguese and Brunei after the Chinese permitted Macao to be leased to the Portuguese.

When the Ming dynasty in China fell, several thousand Chinese refugees fled south and extensively settled on Cham lands and in Cambodia. Most of these Chinese were young males, and they took Cham women as wives. Their children identified more with Chinese culture. This migration occurred in the 17th and 18th centuries.

Chams participated in defeating the Spanish invasion of Cambodia. Cambodian king Cau Bana Cand Ramadhipati, also known as 'Sultan Ibrahim', launched the Cambodian–Dutch War to expel the Dutch. The Vietnamese Nguyen Lords toppled Ibrahim from power to restore Buddhist rule.

In the 18th century and the 19th century, Cambodian-based Chams settled in Bangkok.

=== Fall of the Champa kingdom ===
Further expansion by the Vietnamese in 1692 resulted in the total annexation of the Champa kingdom Panduranga and dissolution by the 19th century Vietnamese Emperor, Minh Mạng. In response, the last Cham Muslim king, Pô Chien, gathered his people in the hinterland and fled south to Cambodia, while those along the coast migrated to Trengganu (Malaysia). A small group fled northward to the Chinese island of Hainan where they are known today as the Utsuls. The king and his people who took refuge in Cambodia were scattered in communities across the Mekong Basin. Those who remained in the Nha Trang, Phan Rang, Phan Rí, and Phan Thiết provinces of central Vietnam were absorbed into the Vietnamese polity. Cham provinces were seized by the Nguyen Lords.

After Vietnam invaded and conquered Champa, Cambodia granted refuge to Cham Muslims escaping from Vietnamese conquest.

In 1832, the Vietnamese Emperor Minh Mang annexed the last Champa Kingdom. This resulted in the Cham Muslim leader Katip Sumat, who was educated in Kelantan, declaring a Jihad against the Vietnamese. The Vietnamese coercively fed lizard and pig meat to Cham Muslims and cow meat to Cham Hindus against their will to punish them and assimilate them to Vietnamese culture. The second revolt led by Ja Thak Wa, a Bani cleric, resulting in the establishment of a Cham resistance which lasted from 1834 to 1835 until it was bloody crushed by Minh Mang's forces in July 1835. Only 40,000 Chams remained in the old Panduranga territory in 1885.

=== 20th century ===
Flag of the FLC – Front de Libération du Champa, which was active during the Vietnam War

At the division of Vietnam in 1954, the majority of Chams remained in South Vietnam. A handful of Chams who were members of the Viet Minh went North during the population exchange between North and South known as Operation Passage to Freedom – along with around ten thousand indigenous highland peoples – mainly Chamic and Bahnaric – from South Vietnam. The Democratic Republic of Vietnam during its early years (1954–1960) were actually more favourable toward ethnic minorities and indigenous peoples, compared to Republic of Vietnam, attacking Ngo Dinh Diem's Kinh chauvinist attitudes. Leaders of Communist Party of Vietnam at the time promised equal rights and autonomy, and by 1955 the North's national broadcast station Voice of Việt Nam began broadcasting propaganda radio in Rhadé, Bahnar, and Jarai, to recruit support from the South's indigenous groups. These cultivation efforts later contributed to the foundation of the FULRO in 1964, although FULRO's objective was to fight against both North and South Vietnam.

In Cambodia, due to discriminatory treatments of the colonial and following Sihanouk governments, the Cham communities here sought communism. The Chams began to rise in prominence in Cambodian politics when they joined the communists as early as the 1950s, with a Cham elder, Sos Man joining the Indochina Communist Party and rising through the ranks to become a major in the Party's forces. He then returned home to the Eastern Zone in 1970 and joined the Communist Party of Kampuchea (CPK), and he co-established the Eastern Zone Islamic Movement with his son, Mat Ly. Together, they became the mouthpiece of the Khmer Rouge and they encouraged the Cham people to participate in the revolution. Sos Man's Islamic Movement was also tolerated by the Khmer Rouge's leadership between 1970 and 1975. The Chams were gradually forced to abandon their faith and their distinct practices, a campaign which was launched in the Southwest as early as 1972.

In the 1960s various movements emerged calling for the creation of a separate Cham state in Vietnam. The Front for the Liberation of Champa (FLC) and the Front de Libération des Hauts plateaux dominated. The latter group sought greater alliance with other hill tribe minorities. Initially known as "Front des Petits Peuples" from 1946 to 1960, the group later took the designation "Front de Libération des Hauts plateaux" and joined, with the FLC, the "Front unifié pour la Libération des Races opprimées" (FULRO) at some point in the 1960s. Since the late 1970s, there has been no serious Cham secessionist movement or political activity in Vietnam or Cambodia.

During the Vietnam War, a sizeable number of Chams migrated to Peninsular Malaysia, where they were granted sanctuary by the Malaysian government out of sympathy for fellow Muslims; most of them have now assimilated with Malay cultures. The integrated community who self identifies as Melayu Champa ("Champa Malay") has dabbled into trades of agarwood, clothing (especially in Kelantan) and fishery (in coastal Pahang) from their arrival in the late 1970s to the 80s.

The Cham community suffered a major blow during the Cambodian genocide in Democratic Kampuchea. The Khmer Rouge targeted ethnic minorities like Chinese, Thai, Lao, Vietnamese and the Cham people, though the Chams suffered the largest death toll in proportion to their population. Around 80,000 to 100,000 Chams out of a total Cham population of 250,000 people in 1975, died in the genocide.

== 21st century ==
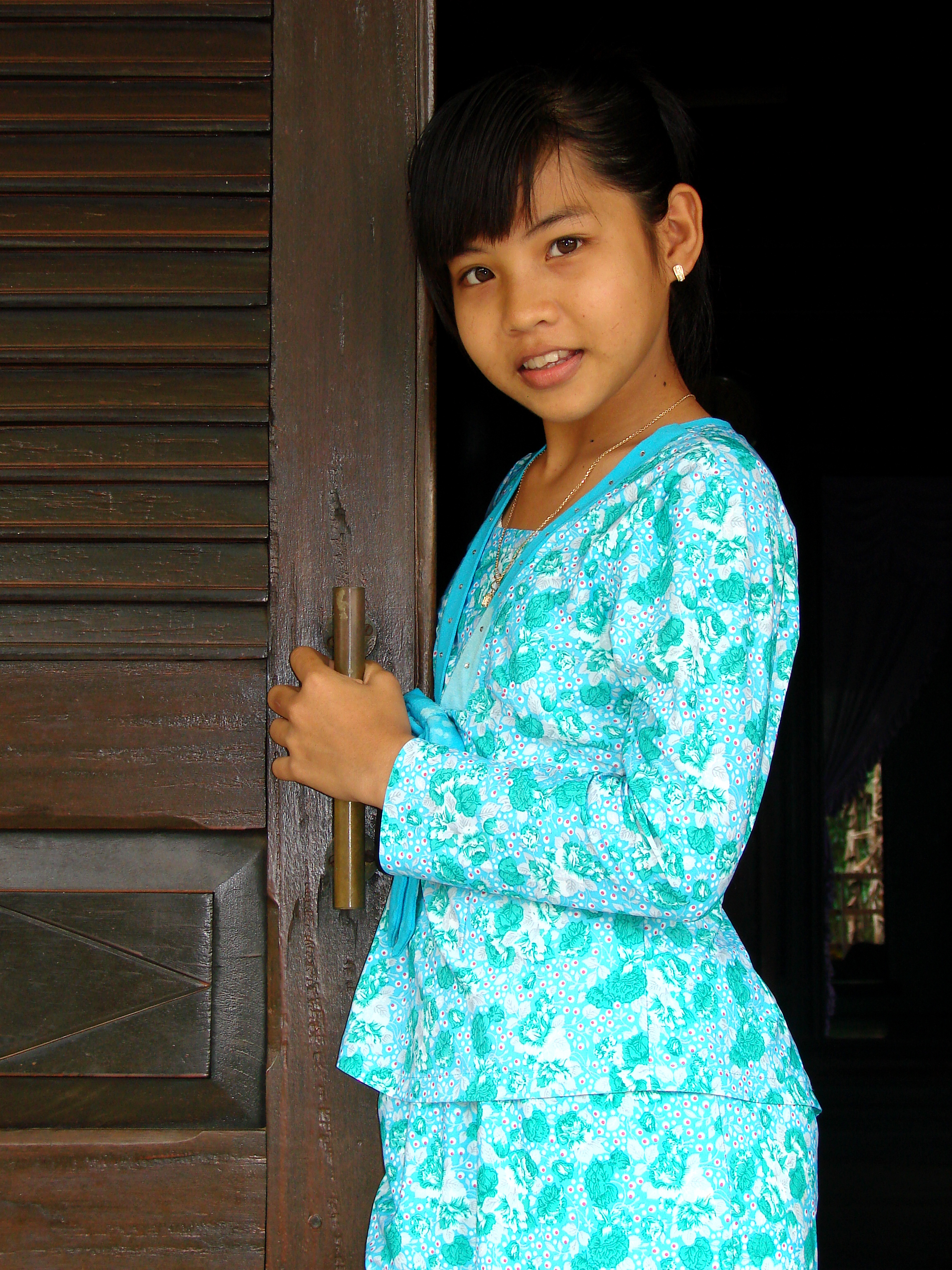
Young Cham girl in Châu Đốc

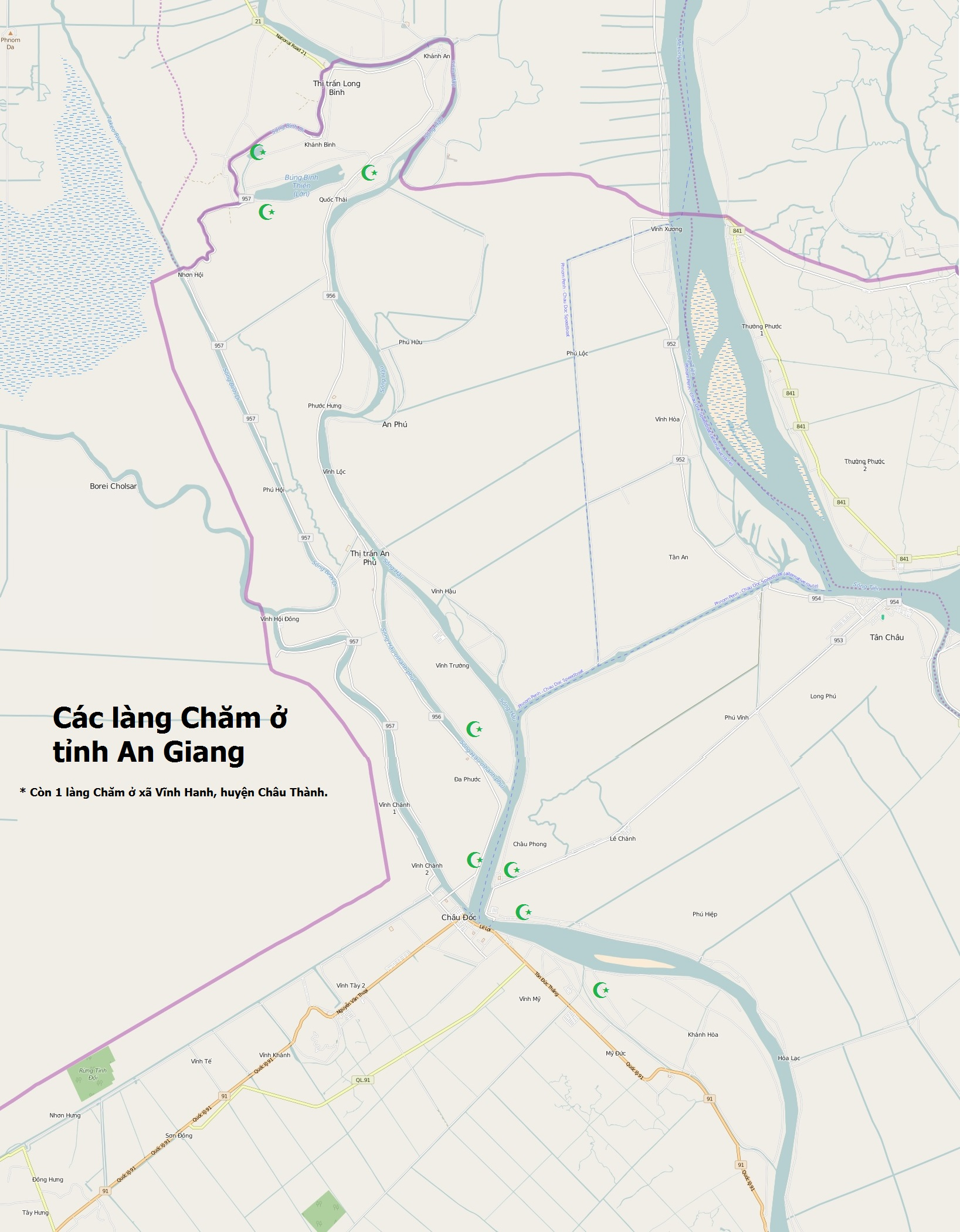
Chams villages in An Giang Province (An Phú, Châu Phú, Châu Thành district, Tân Châu town).

The Chams in Vietnam are officially recognised by the Vietnamese government as one of 54 ethnic groups. There has also been wide-reaching recognition of the historical Champa Kingdom.

An attempt at Salafist expansion among the Chams in Vietnam has been halted by Vietnamese government controls; however, the loss of the Salafis among Chams has been to the benefit of Tablighi Jamaat.

There is evidence that some Acehnese people of Aceh, Sumatra, Indonesia are descendants of Cham refugees who fled after defeat by the Vietnamese polity in the 15th century.

== Geography ==
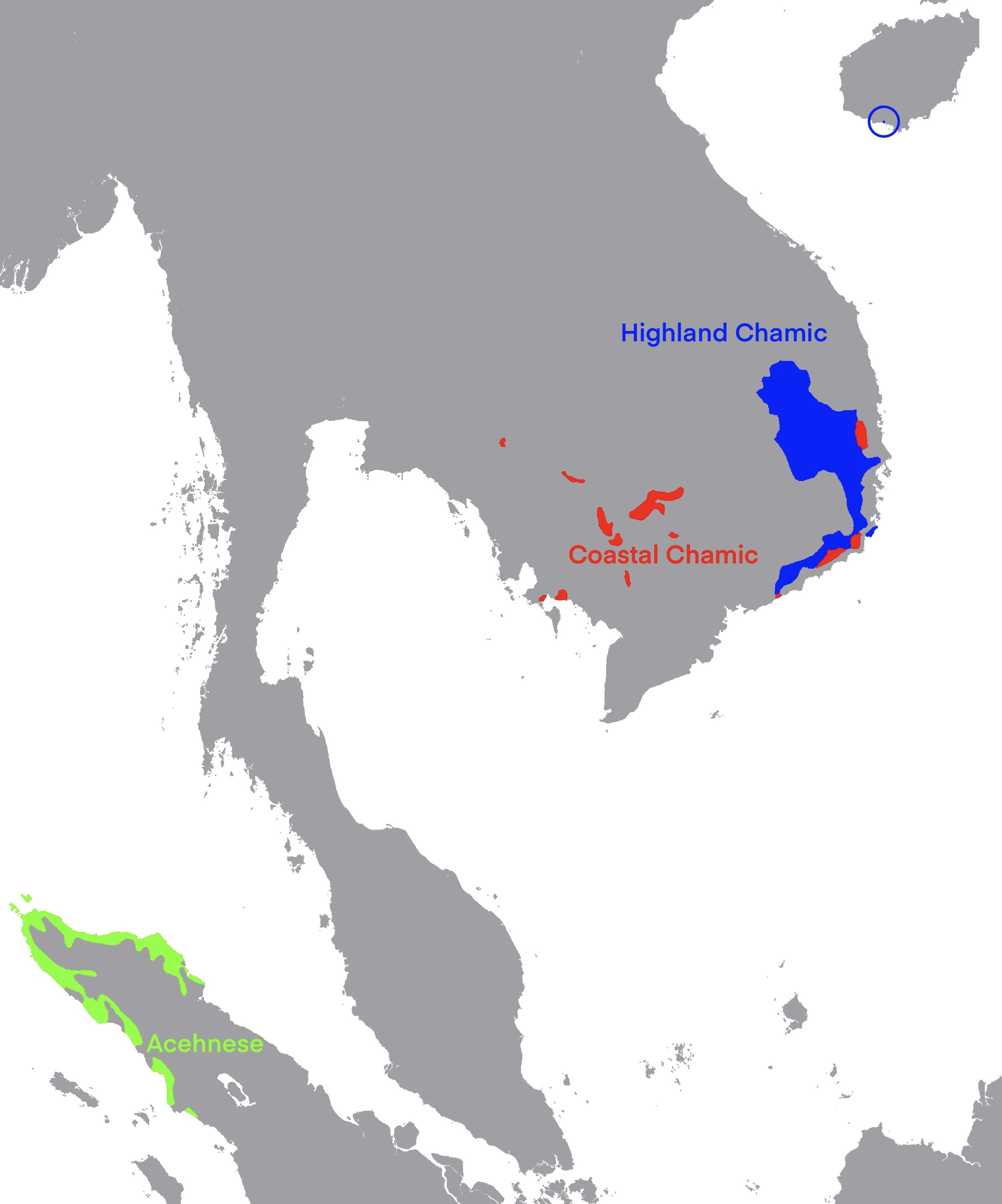
Distribution of Chamic languages in South East Asia.

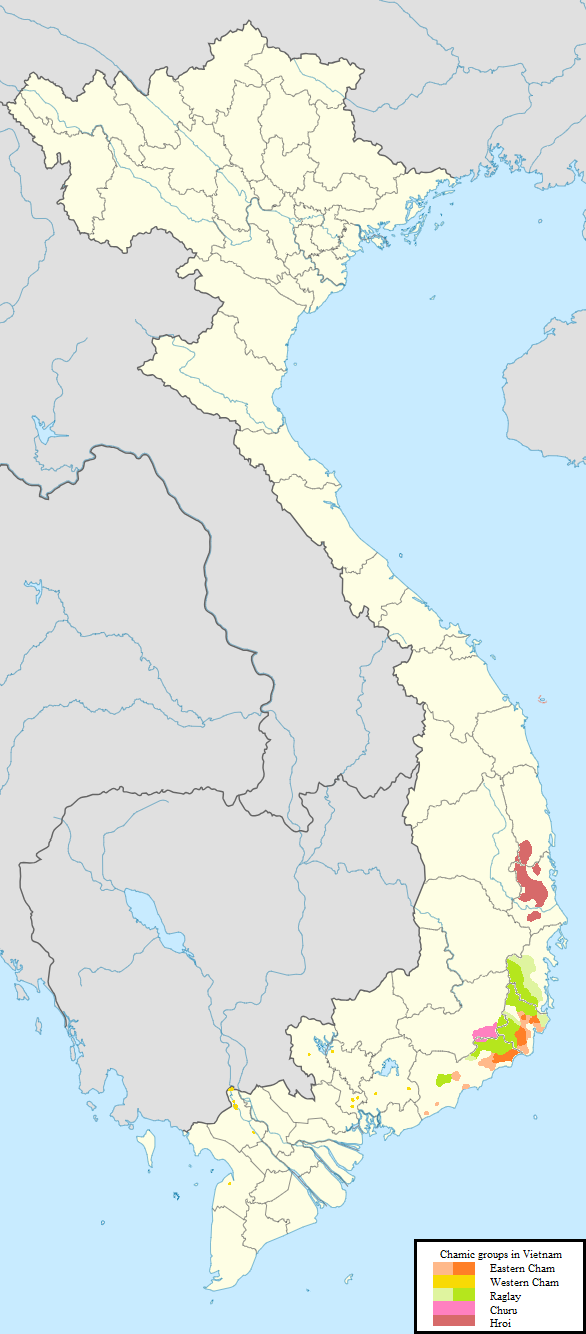
Current distribution of Chams, Roglai and Chru speakers in Vietnam.

Eastern Chams (also known as Panduranga Chams or Phan Rang Chams) and their related ethnic groups, Raglai and Churu, are a major minority in Panduranga region in Bình Thuận and Ninh Thuận provinces of Vietnam. The Haroi Chams mainly populate in Đồng Xuân district of Phu Yen and Vân Canh district of Bình Định province. They are the core of the Hindu and Bani population.

The Western Cham population is concentrated between the in Cambodia and in Southern Vietnam, mainly in Kampong Cham province and An Giang province. In Kampot province, communities of Chvea of Malay origin also identify themselves as Cham. Chams also made significant presence in other southern Vietnamese provinces like Đồng Nai, Tây Ninh, Kiên Giang as well as having a large minority presence in Ho Chi Minh City. This group represents the core of the Muslim communities in both Cambodia and Vietnam. Including the diaspora, their total is about 400,000. An additional 4,000 Chams live in Bangkok, Thailand, whose ancestors migrated there during Rama I's reign. Recent immigrants to Thailand are mainly students and workers, who preferably seek work and education in the southern Islamic Pattani, Narathiwat, Yala and Songkhla provinces.

After the fall of Saigon in Vietnam and Phnom Penh in Cambodia in 1975, 9,704 Cham refugees made their way to Malaysia and were allowed to stay, unlike 250,000 other refugees that fled to Malaysia. Most of the Cham refugees came from Cambodia and were Muslims, known as Melayu Kemboja and Melayu Champa in Malay. Many of these Cham refugees chose to settle in Malaysia, as they preferred to live in an Islamic country and had family ties in the Malaysian states of Kelantan and Terengganu. Kelantan served as a center of Islamic teachings for Chams in Cambodia for three to four centuries and many Cambodian Chams had relatives living there, subsequently many Chams chose to settle in Kelantan. By 1985, around 50,000 or more Chams were living in Malaysia. As of 2013, many have been integrated into Malaysian society.

== Politics ==
While historically complicated, the modern Chams of Cambodia and Vietnam have had friendly relationships with the Khmer and Vietnamese majority. Despite ethnic and religious differences, the majority people of Cambodia and Vietnam have accepted the Chams as closer to them than other minorities. Some Muslim Chams report a friendly attitude of both Cambodians and Vietnamese toward the Chams and little harassment against them from locals. However, between government and people, it is difficult to categorise. According to Cham human rights activists, the Vietnamese regime, the fears of historical influence has evolved into suppression of Islam among Muslims Chams. For example, there is an unofficial ban on distributing the Quran and other Islamic scripture. Even with Vietnam's growing relations with Muslim states like Indonesia, Malaysia, Saudi Arabia, Iran, Turkey and Egypt, the regime discourages growth of Islam because the Vietnamese government distrusts the Cham Muslims.

Relations between the Hanoi government and ethnic minorities are sensitive. In 2001 and 2004 massive human rights protests by hill tribes resulted in deaths and mass imprisonments. For some time after that, the Central Highlands were sealed off to foreigners.

According to international scholars, it is observed that both modern Cham separatism and Cham nationhood are non-existent. The only active representative organisation for the Chams, the International Office of Champa (IOC), based in San Jose, California, only demands civil and land rights for the Cham people in Vietnam and Cambodia. Criticism and concerns against Vietnamese, Indian, Malaysian governments and tourist corporations for misappropriating Cham heritage and ignoring living indigenous culture was made by the IOC and international scientists in recent years.

== Genetics ==
Several studies state that Chams descend from islander Southeast Asian immigrants who later intermixed with mainland Southeast Asians, such as Mon-Khmers and other Austroasiatic groups. Because of this, Chams primarily have Austroasiatic ancestry like other Vietnamese Austronesian groups such as Ede and Giarai. But compared to Ede and Giarai, they share slightly more ancestry with Taiwanese Austronesian groups and have ~10% ancestry from an ancestor of the Atayal. Low to moderate frequencies of South Asian Y-haplogroups are also found in Chams, such as R-M17 (13.6%), R-M124 (3.4%) and H-M69 (1.7%), which is corroborated by a similar proportion of South Asian admixture calculated at 11.6 ± 2.5%.

== Culture ==
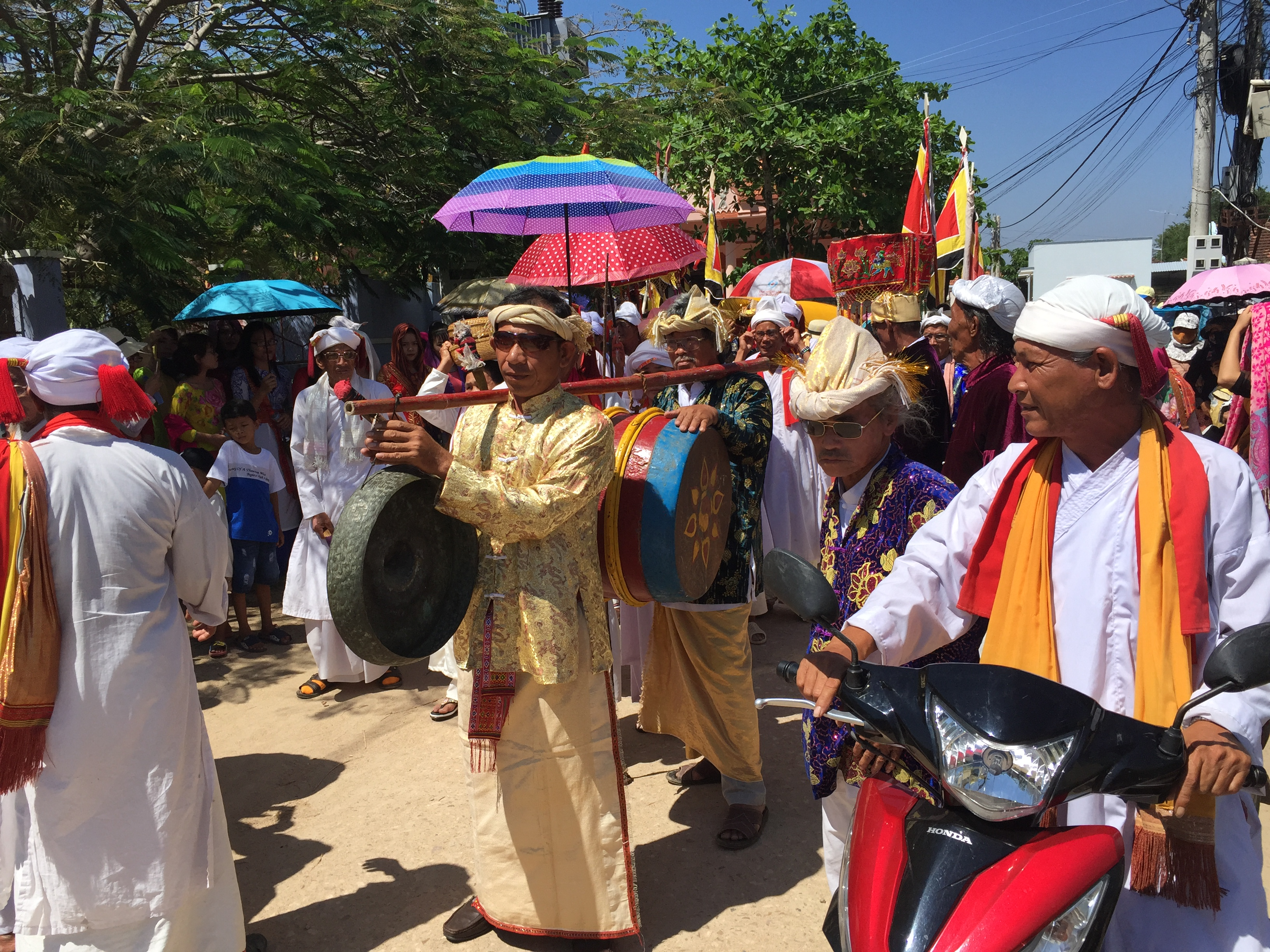
Kate festival of the Cham people

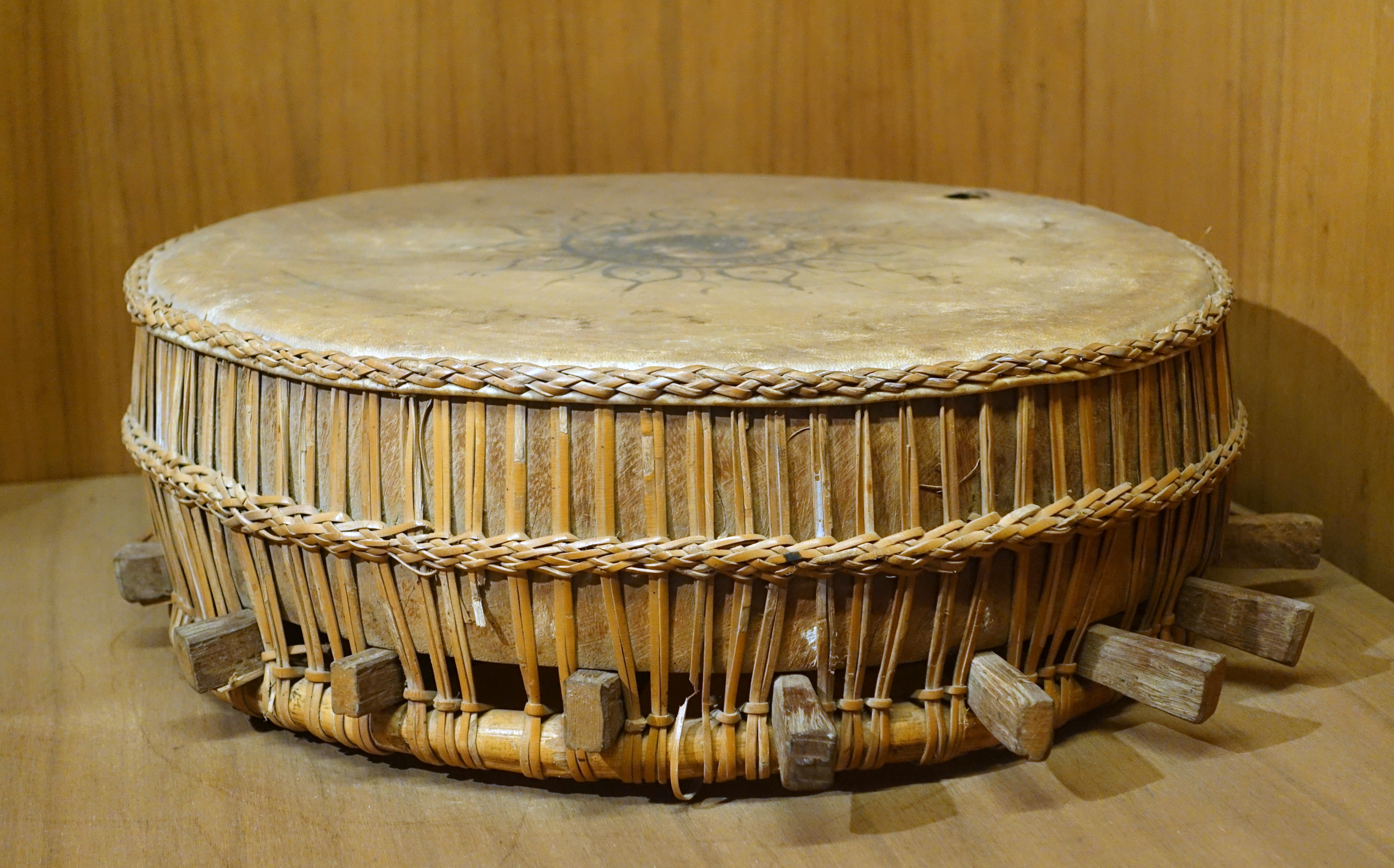
Cham musical drum

The Cham culture is diverse and rich because of the combination of indigenous cultural elements (plains culture, maritime culture, and mountain culture) and foreign cultural features (Indian cultures and religions such as Buddhism; early Han Chinese influences; Islam) (Phan Xuan Bien et al. 1991:376). The blend of indigenous and foreign elements in Cham culture is a result of ecological, social, and historical conditions. The influences of various Indian cultures produced similarities among many groups in Southeast Asia such as the Chams, who traded or communicated with polities on the Indian subcontinent. However, the indigenous elements also allow for cultural distinctions. As an example, Brahmanism became the Ahier religion, while other aspects of influence were changed, to adapt to local Ahier characteristics and environment. The blending of various cultures has produced its own unique form through the prolific production of sculptures and architecture only seen at the Champa temple tower sites.

The Chams shielded and always observed their girls attentively, placing great importance on their virginity. A Cham saying said "As well leave a man alone with a girl, as an elephant in a field of sugarcane."

The Cham Muslims view the karoeh (also spelled karoh) ceremony for girls as very significant. This symbolic ceremony marks the passage of a girl from infancy to puberty (the marriageable age), and usually takes place when the girl is aged fifteen and has completed her development. If it has not taken place, the girl cannot marry since she is "tabung". After the ceremony is done the girl can marry. Circumcision to the Chams was less significant than karoeh. It is not practised, only symbolic and performed with a toy wooden knife.

Important festivals include Kate, celebrated mainly by the Chams of central Vietnam. The festival venerates ancient Cham royalty gods. Among Cham Muslims, Ramadan, El Fitri, and the Hajj are important celebrations. However, the Chams (regardless of faith) all have a very rich tradition of dance, arts, music, costumes, poetry, and more.

=== Language ===
The Cham language is part of the Austronesian language family. Although sparse, Cham literary tradition is ancient, dating back to the 4th century AD. The Dong Yen Chau inscription, written in old Cham, is the oldest known attestation of an Austronesian language. Cham is very rich with many loan words and terminology influenced by many other languages it came into contact with. Most Chams speak the language though many also speak the dominant language of the nation they reside in like Vietnamese, Khmer, Malay and others. Some Chams can also speak and write Arabic.

Cham is written in Eastern Cham script in Central Vietnam while the language is predominantly written in Jawi Arabic script around the Mekong Delta. Western Cham script, used in Cambodia, is different enough from Eastern Cham's to be under review by the Unicode Consortium for inclusion as its own block — as of 2022, the character set is still being revised.

The Kan Imam San sect, accounting for about 10% of the Cambodian Cham minority and mainly centered around a few villages in the Tralach District of Kampong Chhnang Province and their historic mosque atop Phnom Oudong, have kept the use of the Western Cham script, akhar srak, alive — with grants from the US embassy for about a decade starting in 2007, the written form of Western Cham has moved from the preserve of a few elders to being taught in close to 20 classrooms with thousands of students exposed to some degree, albeit limited.

Almost all of the existing texts are housed at two Kan Imam San mosques in Kampong Tralach, primarily at the Au Russey mosque.

=== Religion ===
The first recorded religion of the Champa was a form of Shaiva Hinduism, brought by sea from India. Hinduism was the predominant religion among the Cham people until the sixteenth century. Numerous temples dedicated to Shiva were constructed in the central part of what is now Vietnam. The jewel of such temple is Mỹ Sơn. It is often compared with other historical temple complexes in Southeast Asia, such as Borobudur of Java in Indonesia, Angkor Wat of Cambodia, Bagan of Myanmar and Ayutthaya of Thailand. As of 1999, Mỹ Sơn has been recognised by UNESCO as a world heritage site.

Religiously and culturally, the Chams were grouped into two major religio-cultural groups; the Balamon Chams that adhere to an indigenised form of Hinduism, and Cham Bani that adhere to an indigenised form of Islam. The term "Balamon" derived from "Brahmana", the priests. The term "Bani" on the other hand is derived from Arabic term "bani" (بني) which means "people". Balamon Chams adhere to the old religion of their ancestor, an indigenised form of Hinduism that thrived since the ancient era of Kingdom of Champa in the 5th century AD, whereas Cham Bani are adherents of a localised version of Islam, including a minor element of Sufism, endured with Hindu-Chamic customs as early as around the 11th–13th century. However, it was not until the 17th century that Islam began to attract large numbers of Chams, when some members of the Cham royalty converted to Islam. These two groups mostly live in separate villages. Intermarriage was prohibited in former times, and remains rare even nowadays. Both groups are matrilineal and conform to matrilocal residence practice.

As Muslim merchants of Arab and of Persian origin stopped along the Vietnam coast en route to China, Islam began to influence Cham civilisation. The exact date that Islam came to Champa is unknown; however, the religion first arrived around the ninth century. It is generally assumed that Islam came to mainland Southeast Asia much later than its arrival in China during the Tang dynasty (618–907) and that Arab traders in the region came into direct contact only with the Chams and not others. Islam began making headway among the Chams beginning in the eleventh century, however it split into two distinctive versions.

- The version of Islam practised by the Vietnamese Chams in Central Vietnam is often called Bani which contains many pre-Islamic beliefs and rituals such as magic, spirit worship, and propitiation of the souls of former kings, something mistaken to Hinduism. Bani Islam is the syncretic form of Islam (including minor influences from Sunni and Sufism teaching) that blends indigenous cultural beliefs that are practised by the Cham Bani, who predominantly live in Vietnam's Bình Thuận and Ninh Thuận Provinces, and is considered unorthodox from mainstream Islam. The Cham Bani worship in mosques which are where the main communal setting for prayers and religious rituals take place among the Bani Cham They also celebrate the month of Ramuwan (Ramadan), during which they pray to Allah for their deceased ancestors in the hereafter and pray for good fortune in the lives, and the acar (Imams) stay at the thang magik (Mosques) for one month and pray to God the practice is known as Iʿtikāf. In general, the Bani Muslims are not willing to identify themselves as Shi'a or even Muslims, but as Bani Muslims instead, although some even openly reject the terms "Muslims" in favour of "Banis" alone. The notion of Bani being an Islamic sect is a norm used by the official narratives, with most Muslim scholars rejecting Bani as an Islamic sect due to its difference from mainstream Islam, which Bani originated from.
- The version of Islam practised by Cambodian and Southern Vietnamese Chams belong to mainstream Sunni Islam, mainly to the Shafi'i school, which is also found in Malaysia, Indonesia, Mindanao, Southern Thailand as well as Yemen and East Africa, and in general, they largely abide with the mainstream Sunni Islamic practise, such as observing Ramadan, Mawlid, Eid al-Fitr, Eid al-Adha, Ashura, Islamic New Year, as well as doing Hajj and Umrah. At some aspects however, due to interaction with other religions and thoughts at the same time, mainly from influences of Confucianism, Mahayana Buddhism, Hinduism and Theravada Buddhism, it has many indigenous, magical, Hindu and Buddhist elements to it; while some practice a more centralised form of Sunni Islam and some reformist movements like Salafism can also be found. However, a small band of Chams, who called themselves Kaum Jumaat, follow a localised adaptation of Islamic theology, according to which they pray only on Fridays and celebrate Ramadan for only three days. Some members of this group have joined the larger Muslim Cham community in their practices of Islam in recent years. One of the factors for this change is the influence by members of their family who have gone abroad to study Islam.
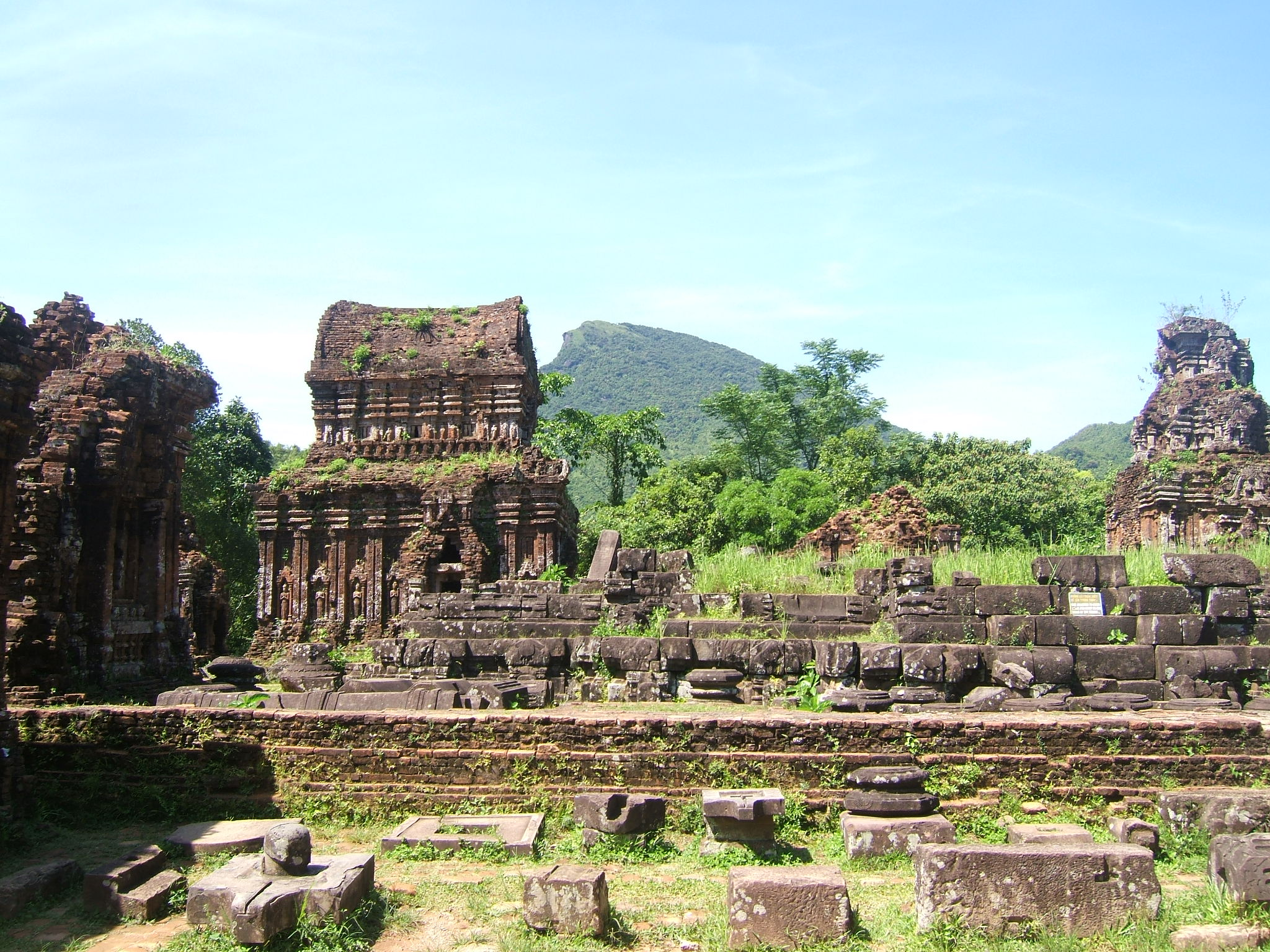
The temples at Mỹ Sơn are one of the holiest of Cham sites

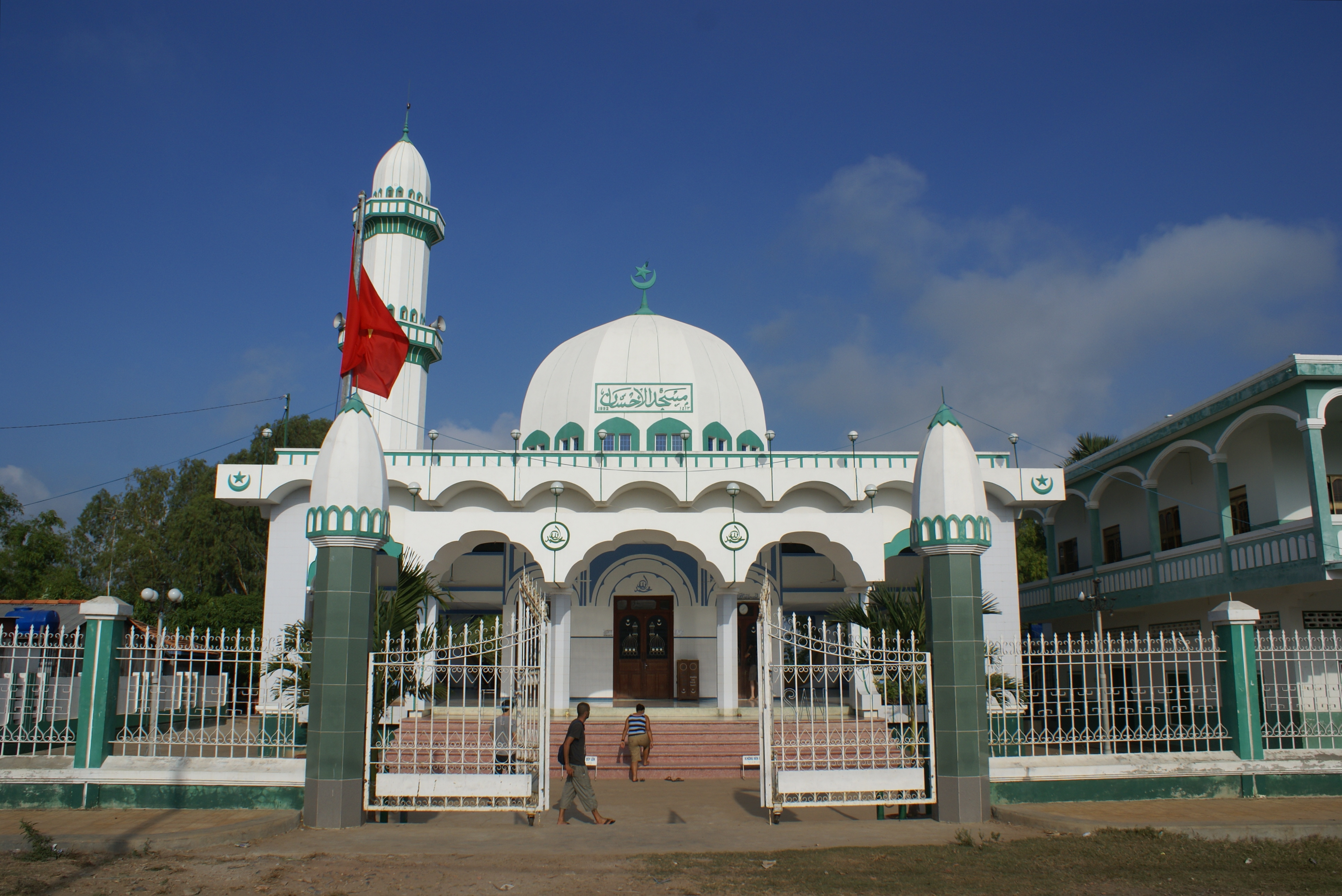
A mosque in Da Phuoc village, An Phu district, An Giang province.

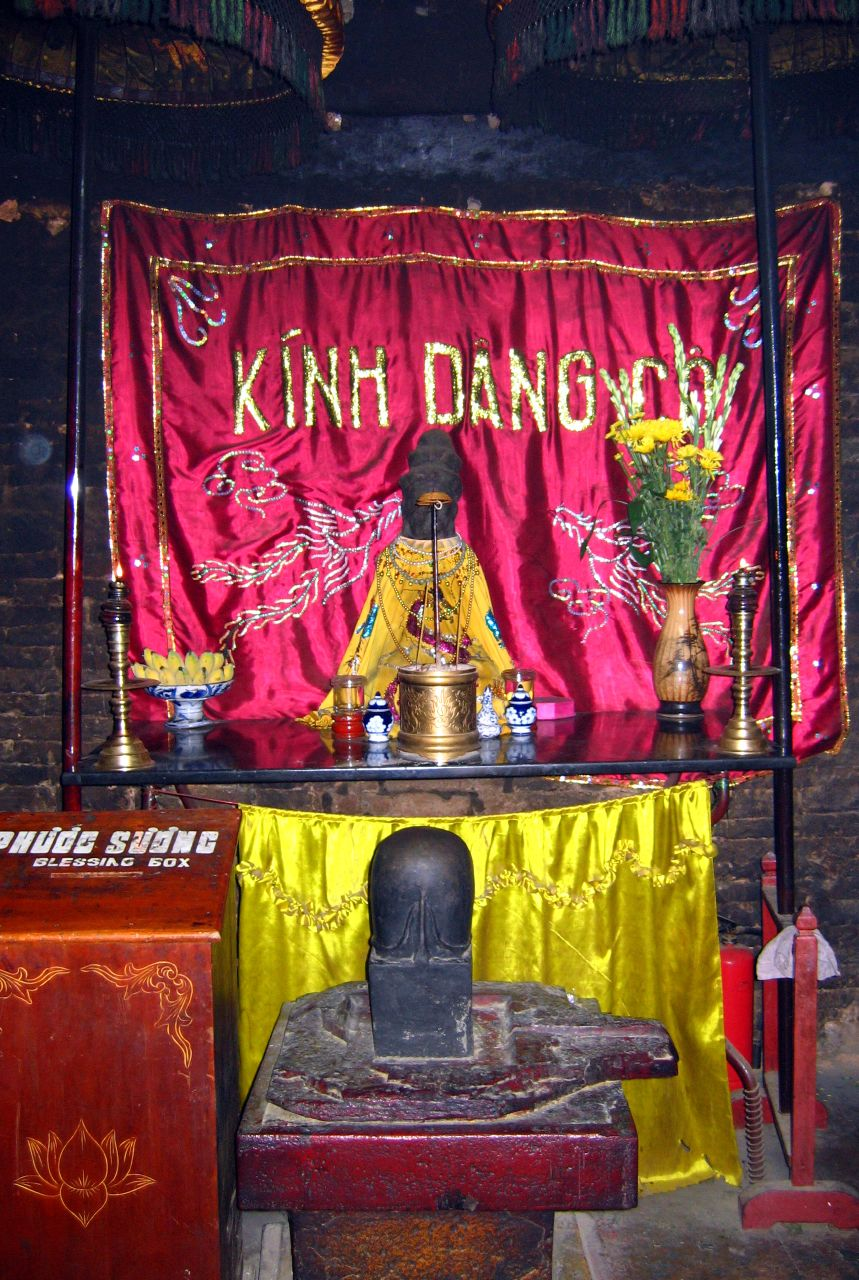
Inside Cham temple in Nha Trang

==== Numbers ====
The number of Balamon Cham Hindus in Vietnam were declared at 64,547 (36%) out of a total Cham population of 178,948 according to the 2019 population census. They do not have a caste system, although previously they may have been divided between the Nagavamshi Kshatriya and the Brahmin castes, the latter of which would have represented a small minority of the population.

Hindu temples are known as Bimong in Cham language, but are commonly referred to as tháp "stupa", in Vietnamese. The priests are divided into three levels, where the highest rank are known as Po Adhia or Po Sá, followed by Po Tapáh and the junior priests Po Paséh.

The majority of Hindu Chams in Vietnam (also known as the Eastern Chams) are syncretic Ahiér Hindu and Bani Muslims and they mostly live in Central Vietnam, while Southern Vietnam's Chams and their Cambodian counterparts are largely Sunni Muslim, as Islamic conversion happened relatively late. A number emigrated to France in the late 1960s during the Vietnam War. In the Mekong Delta, the mainly Cham Sunni community has a population of around 25,000 in 2006.

=== Cuisine ===
Popular Cham dishes are muthin ritong (rice with fish), lithei jrau (rice with meat and vegetables), abu mutham (gruel with fish and vegetables), and kari cam murong (chicken or beef curry). A speciality of Chams in An Giang province is the beef sausage tung lamaow (Cham: ꨓꨭꩂ ꨤꨟꨯꨱꨥ). Chams in this province are also known for their beef, goat or chicken curry with rice.

Chams eat three meals a day – breakfast, lunch and dinner – with rice, maize, sweet potato and beans being the staple food. Other foods eaten by the Chams depend on the region they inhabit. Chams in Central Vietnam eat meat and processed meat products and arrange food in trays and use chopsticks and bowls similar to Kinh people, while Chams in Southern Vietnam eat fish and shrimps and arrange food on plates. Cham cuisine is also diversified by the food prohibitions in religions practised by Chams: Hindu Chams not eating beef, and Muslim Chams not eating pork, while Buddhism-practicing Cham Hroi of Phú Yên and Bình Định provinces in Vietnam eating both beef and pork.

Cham cuisine is very similar to the cuisines of Cambodia, Laos and Northern Thailand. It is sweeter and spicier than the cuisine of Northern Vietnam and uses many different types of fermented fish (mắm), including mắm nêm, which along with different spices, curries and other Cham dishes entered the cuisine of Southern Vietnam following the Vietnamese conquest and annexation of Champa during Vietnam's southward expansion. Another type of mắm that may have originally been a Cham product is mắm ruốc, which has become a famous condiment in modern-day Central Vietnam eaten with raw vegetables, herbs and boiled pork and used as an essential ingredient for the Central Vietnamese noodle dish bún bò Huế.

In Malaysia, where the majority of Chams are from Cambodia, most of their dishes, such as leas hal, num banhchok, and num kong, are of Cambodian origin, while the Cham style of coffee (café Yuon) and green tea have been adopted from the Vietnamese. Other Malaysian Cham dishes, such as tung lamaow and paynong (banana-filled glutinous rice cakes wrapped in banana leaves) are known by Chams in both Cambodia and Vietnam.

== Notable Chams ==
In accordance with Cham custom, the surname is (in some cases) followed by the given name.

- Fatima Ahmed, Italian-Somali writer of distant Cham origin
- Amath Yashya (Amadh Yahya), Cambodian-Cham politician; ex-Member of Parliament, deputy in the National Assembly of Cambodia representing Kampong Cham province, President of Cambodian Islamic Development Association (CIDA); Candlelight Party and Cambodia National Rescue Party
- Samad Bounthong, Cham-American soccer player
- Chế Linh, Vietnamese-Cham singer
- Dụng Quang Nho, Vietnamese footballer
- Inrasara (Phú Trạm), poet and Cham cultural scholar
- Les Kosem, Cambodian-Cham activist leader in FULRO (d. 1976)
- Maha Sajan, king of Champa
- Nurhaliza Mohamath, Cham-American restauranteur and cookbook author
- Amu Nhan, expert on Cham music
- Po Binasuor, the last strong king of Champa
- Po Dharma, Vietnamese-Cham activist leader of FULRO, he was also a Cham cultural historian
- Po Tisuntiraidapuran, ruler of Champa from 1780 to 1793
- Yeu Muslim, Cambodian footballer

== See also ==
- Art of Champa
- Cham alphabet
- Cham calendar
- Cham language
- Hinduism in Southeast Asia
- Islam in Cambodia
- Islam in Southeast Asia
- Islam in Vietnam
