= Cham calendar =

Lunisolar calendar used by the Cham people of Vietnam

The Cham calendar (Cham: ꨧꨆꨥꨪ sakawi) is a lunisolar calendar used by the Cham people of Vietnam since ancient times. Its origins is based on Saka Raja calendar which was influenced by the Shaka era (78 CE) Indian Hindu calendar, with the current standard called Sakawi Cham likely instituted during the reign of Po Rome of the Champa kingdom.

== Features ==
The Cham calendar (Sakawi Cam/Cham) has a system of a set of revolving cycles of days, weeks, months and years. The Cham month consists of two lunar phases of 15 days each. The 1st half denotes the full moon phase called Bingun (Śukla pakṣa), while the new moon phase is called Kanem (Kṛṣṇa pakṣa). The 12 year cycle similar to Chinese zodiac is referred to as Nasak(12 Nasak from 27/28 Nakṣatra). The Cham calendar known as Sakawi Cam is a term used to encompass two calendar variants.

- Sakawi Ahier: This is used by Bhap Cam/Chăm Bà La Môn and is Chams' lunisolar calendar in nature.
- Sakawi Awal: This is used by Bhap Ni/Hồi Giáo Bà Ni and is Javanese lunar calendar in nature.

The calendar is used as an agricultural almanac to ascertain the time of cultivation. The biggest Cham festival known as Kate falls on the 1st day of the seventh Cham month (9th Imlek month).

== Sakawi Ahier ==
=== System ===
The names of the days of the Cham week were derived from their Sanskrit names used in the traditional Hindu calendar.

| Gregorian Day | Cham day (Haray) | Akhar Cam (ꨨꨣꩈ) |
|---|---|---|
| Sunday | Adit | ꨀꨕꨪꩅ |
| Monday | Thom | ꨔꨯꩌ |
| Tuesday | Angar | ꨀꨋꩉ |
| Wednesday | But | ꨝꨭꩅ |
| Thursday | Jip | ꨎꨪꩇ |
| Friday | Suk | ꨧꨭꩀ |
| Saturday | Thanchar | ꨔꩆꨍꩉ |

The length of the month: the full month (balan tapăk) has 30 days and the hollow month (balan u) has 29 days.

| Gregorian month | Cham month (Balan) |
|---|---|
| 1st month | Balan sa |
| 2nd month | Balan dua |
| 3rd month | Balan klau |
| 4th month | Balan pak |
| 5th month | Balan lima |
| 6th month | Balan nam |
| 7th month | Balan tijuh |
| 8th month | Balan dalapan |
| 9th month | Balan salapan |
| 10th month | Balan sa pluh |
| 11th month | Balan sa plu sa |
| 12th month | Balan sa plu dua |

Balan Mak [Māgha]

=== Cham zodiac ===
The Cham zodiac is similar to the Vietnamese zodiac in its usage and arrangement of animals, but replaces the Monkey with the turtle (kra); the cat with the rabbit (Tapay).

| Chinese zodiac | Cham zodiac (nâthak) |
|---|---|
| Rat | Tikuh |
| Buffalo | Kubao |
| Tiger | Rimaong |
| Rabbit | Tapay |
| Dragon | Inagirai |
| Snake | Ulanaih |
| Horse | Athaih |
| Goat | Pabaiy |
| Turtle | Kra |
| Rooster | Manuk |
| Dog | Athau |
| Pig | Papwiy |

== Sakawi Awal ==
This variant is influenced by of 12 Arabic lunar months system consisting of 29-30 days. It uses an 8 year cycle called Ikessarak. This variant is used for certain Islamic festivals observed by the Bani Chams.

| Year | Cycle | Pattern |
|---|---|---|
| 1 | Lieh | Normal, Leap |
| 2 | Hak | Leap, Normal |
| 3 | Jim | Normal, Leap |
| 4 | Jay | Normal, Normal |
| 5 | Dal | Leap, Normal |
| 6 | Bak | Normal, Leap |
| 7 | Wao | Normal, Normal |
| 8 | Jim Luic | Leap, Normal |

== Festivals ==
Important festivals in the Cham calendar:

- Rija Nukan- Cham New Year (Mar/Apr)
- Katê- Harvest festival (Sep)

== See also ==
- Cham festival
