= Fatima Ahmed =

Italian-Somali writer

- Born: 1949 (age 76–77); Phnom Penh, Cambodia
- Occupations: Writer; interpreter
- Children: 3

Fatima Ahmed (born 1949, Phnom Penh) is an Italian-Somali writer.

== Early life ==
Fatima Ahmed was born in Phnom Penh, the capital of Cambodia, in 1949. Her father was a Somali sailor, and her mother was of Vietnamese Cham ancestry. Because of the civil war in Cambodia, Ahmed's family sought shelter in Somalia. While they were there, Ahmed was involved in radio programs, including being a guest speaker on Radio Mogadishu. They later migrated to Italy. In Italy, she was mainly engaged in cultural mediation and as a Vietnamese-language interpreter.

== Biography ==
She later became a writer and cultural mediator who actively participated in meetings, seminars, conferences and cultural activities concerning post-colonial identity. Her writing was mostly about post-colonial experiences. She has collaborated with the EKS & TRA association in literature works as well as dealing with migration. Her publications include Il Ritorno, Shanti (for which she received a medal from the Presidency of the Italian Republic) and Gocce di ricordi, which also won literary prizes. Aukuí was her first novel. She has three children with her Italian husband. They have lived around Lake Maggiore since 1989.
