= Traditional games of Korea =

Traditional games of Korea (Korean: 전통놀이; Hanja: 傳統놀이; RR: jeontongnori) have been influenced by the culture, history and environment of Korea. Examples of popular traditional games include jegichagi, neolttwigi, ssireum, tuho, yut, biseokchigi and paengichigi.

== Characteristics ==
Korean traditional games originated from folk beliefs. The peninsula has been agrarian since ancient times, and Koreans have believed in gods who protect nature and their lands. Exorcisms were performed to increase crops and animal well-being; singing and dancing were popular activities. Traditional games developed during this early period. Although many folk beliefs have disappeared, the games continue to be played.

The names and rules of the games differ by region. In Gyeonggi Province, Gonu is called "Gonu, Goni, Ggoni". Under Japanese rule, nearly all traditional games in Korea disappeared.

Most games (such as Tuho, Ssireum and kite flying) are played with the hands or feet (Jegichagi, Taekgyeon) and do not require equipment or a specific play area. The games are related to the four seasons.

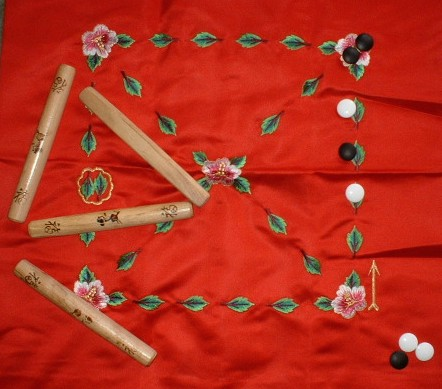
Yutnori

== Games ==
=== Yutnori ===
Yutnori, a board dice game with four wooden sticks, is one of the most popular traditional games of Korea and usually played on the first day of the New Year by two players (or teams).

Each player (or team of two players) takes turns throwing yut sticks. Each stick has two sides (round and flat), which makes the stick roll. Five combinations are possible with yut sticks: do, gae, geol, yut and mo. A player achieving a yut or mo is allowed to roll again. If a board piece lands on a space occupied by an opponent, it is returned to the start and the player goes again. If a piece lands on a space occupied by one's own team, the pieces can go together (counting as one). The combinations determine how the board pieces are moved, and the team that moves all four pieces around the board first wins. The game has its roots in divination rituals.

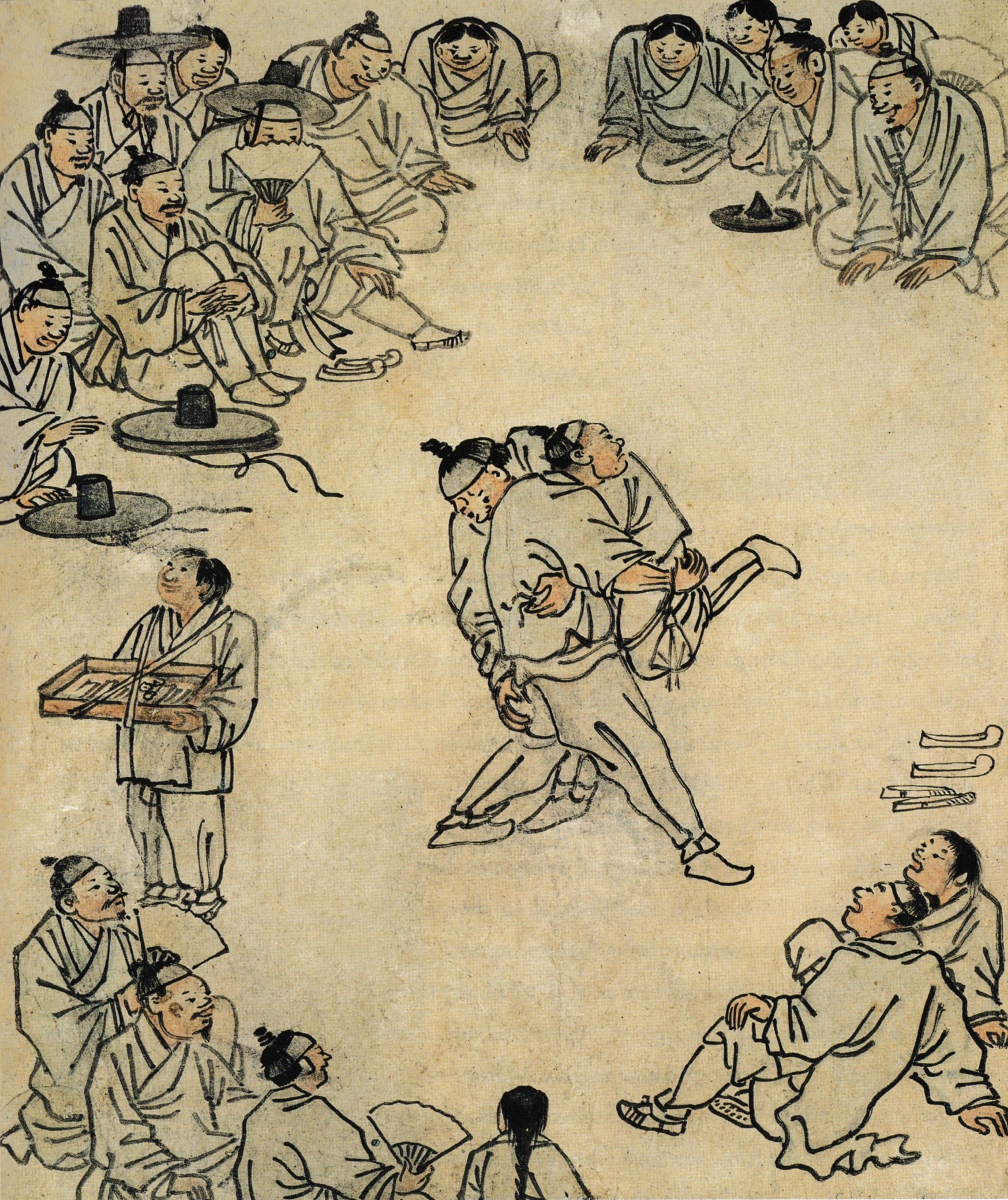
Sangbak (상박; 相撲) by Kim Hong-do, late 18th century

=== Ssireum (wrestling) ===
Ssireum is similar to Japanese sumo wrestling, with two opponents wrestling each other in a sandy ring. The player who throws his opponent to the ground scores a point. Annual competitions are held, which are popular. Ssireum, a contest of strength and technique, is a form of wrestling unique to Korea.

Traditionally practiced as combat and self-defense, ssireum was also part of rituals conducted in the ancient tribal states. Rules evolved, allowing ssireum to develop into a national sport valued for competition and entertainment.

=== Top-spinning ===
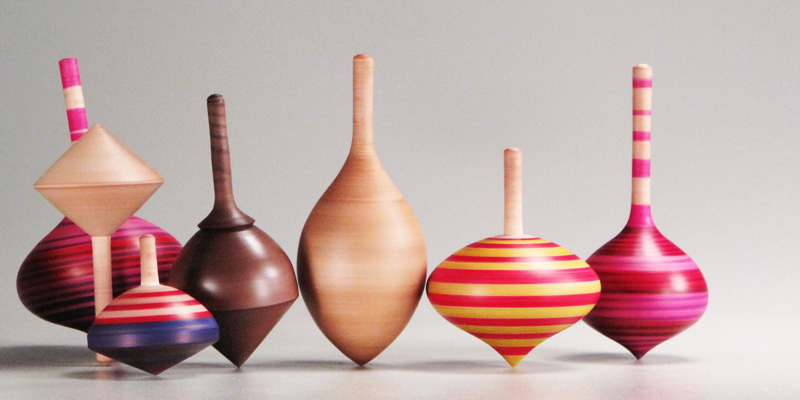
Tops spinning

In top-spinning, played primarily by children, a player spins a wooden top with a stick to make it spin on ice or on the ground. Popular in winter, the games have names which vary by region. The best tops (made from birch, jujube or pine) are heavy, with strong tips, and they are often spun in groups.

=== Kite flying ===
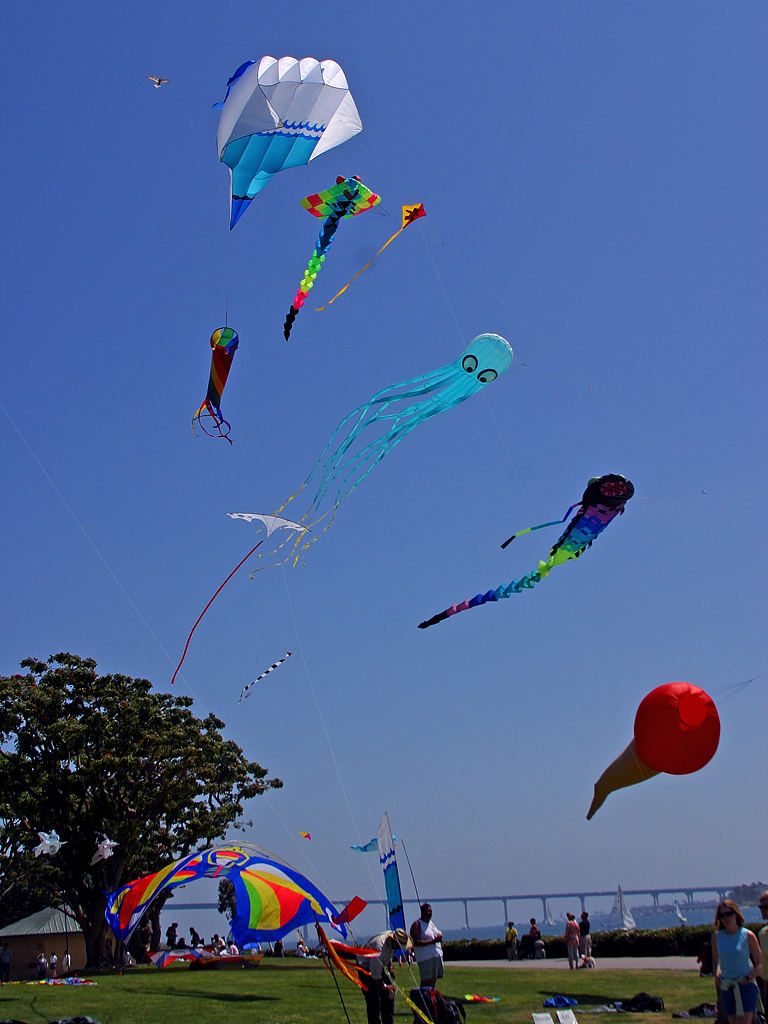
Kite flying

Korean kite games are known as Yeonnalligi. Kite frames are generally made of bamboo, with paper attached. Most kites, rectangular or stingray-shaped, are tethered with string on a reel. Kite flying is a traditional winter game for children and adults. There is a period of kite flying from New Year's Day to Daeboreum, after which the kite string is cut for it to fly away. Kite flying is less common today, due to work obligations, but kites were flown as a distraction from the cold winter.

=== Tuho ===
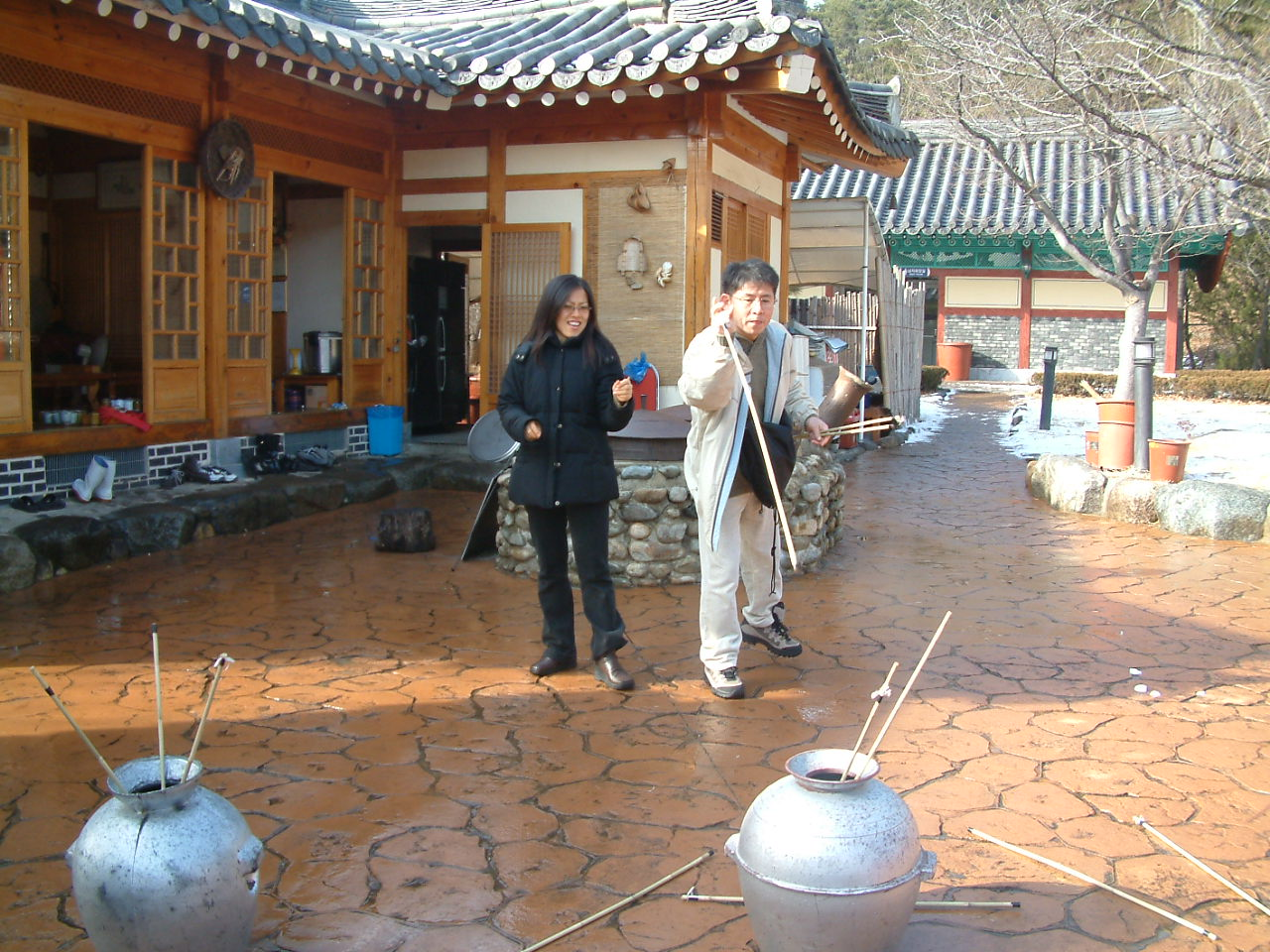
Tuho

Tuho was originally popular among royal families and the upper class. In a manner similar to horseshoes, tuho players attempt to throw arrows into the top of a narrow-necked wooden jar. The score is determined by the number of arrows in the jar. Tuho is presently played by people from all classes.

According to Rebecca Lucas, tuho was played on the Korean Peninsula during the Gorguryeo Kingdom (37 BCE–668 CE) and is mentioned in the History of Old Tang (舊唐書) and the Book of Sui (隋書). The game waned in popularity because King Yejong of Goryeo (c. 1105–1122) received a tuho set from the Song emperor in 1116 and did not know how it was played. During the Joseon dynasty, it was promoted as Confucian. The game was played by both women and men, including Prince Yangnyong (양녕대군, 讓寧大君, 1394–1462) and his sisters, and King Hyeonjong of Joseon (현종, 顯宗. 1641–1674) and his family.

=== Gonu ===
A variety of Pong Hau K'i, Gonu's name (goni, ggoni, ggon or gonni) and rules vary by region; examples are pond, line or pumpkin gonu. This game is played with a small pebble (or piece of wood) and a game board drawn on the ground or a piece of paper. Players move their pebbles one block forward, and the player who blocks their opponent's pebble wins.

Gonu boards
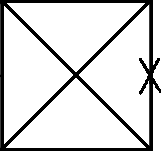

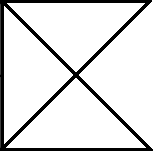

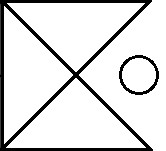

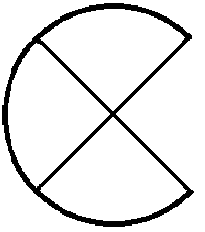

=== Neolttwigi ===
Neolttwigi is a game involving a seesaw. Unlike Western seesaws where riders sit on the board, neolttwigi participants stand and jump, which launches their partner into the air. The game is popular among girls during traditional holidays and festivals such as Dano and Chuseok.

=== Jegichagi ===
In jegichagi, players kick a jegi and the player with the greatest number of kicks wins, similar to Western Hacky Sack. Usually played in winter, jegichagi's name varies by region. The jegi, similar in appearance to a shuttlecock, is made from a coin and hanji (handmade Korean paper). The player kicks the jegi into the air and continues kicking it to keep it off the ground; switching the kicking foot is permitted. In a one-on-one game, the player with the highest number of consecutive kicks wins; in a group game, players stand in a circle and take turns kicking the jegi. A player who lets the jegi fall to the ground loses and tosses it to the winner to kick. When the loser catches the jegi with their hands, they can rejoin the game.

=== Gonggi ===
Gonggi (공기) is a popular Korean children's game that is traditionally played using five or more small grape-sized pebbles or coloured plastic stones. It can be played alone or with friends. Since only a few stones and a flat surface are needed for play, the game can be played by anyone almost anywhere. The same game also exists in Nepal and it is called Gatti. It is similar to Knucklebones in Western tradition. There are many ways to play Gonggi, but the most typical way to play Gonggi is playing with five marbles or pebbles. Also, Gonggi was played in many other places.

=== Juldarigi ===
Juldarigi (줄다리기) is a traditional Korean sport similar to tug of war. It uses two huge rice-straw ropes, connected by a central peg. The ropes are pulled by teams that represent the East and West sides of the village (the competition is often rigged in favour of the Western team). A number of religious and traditional rituals are performed before and after the actual competition.

=== Rolling hoop ===
Rolling hoop is a Korean traditional game that uses an iron stick. In the past, people used an old wagon wheel instead of an iron hoop. In the opening ceremony of the 1988 Olympics in Seoul, there was a performance that featured rolling hoop.

=== Seokjeon ===
Goguryeo held an annual national seokjeon (stone battle) attended by the king himself. Originally a product of the warlike Goguryeo period, seokjeon gradually evolved into a widely enjoyed pastime during the more peaceful Goryeo and Joseon periods.

== Seasonal games ==
Seasonal games
Korean New Year (설날)	Daeboreum (대보름)	Chuseok (추석)	Dano (단오)
Yut (윷놀이)	Chajeon Nori (차전놀이)	Ganggangsullae (강강술래)	Ssireum (씨름)
Tuho (투호)	Jwibulnori (쥐불놀이)	Bullfighting (소 놀이)	Geunettwigi (그네뛰기)
Neolttwigi (널뛰기)	Kite flying (연날리기)		

== Other traditional Korean games ==
=== Bossaum ===
==== Origin ====
Bossaum in English is called 'dam wrecking'. Children created 'dam wrecking' through observation of adults and created their own dams. Through the creation of these small dams, they invented the game, bossaum.

==== Objective of the game ====
A game where players compete to destroy opposing team's dams.

==== How to play the game ====
Players are divided into two teams and then proceed to decide where teams will set their dams: upstream or downstream. The players will then start building their dams with anything around them (ex. stones, dirt, grass, sticks, etc.) in order to build a dam. To get the correct thickness and create a durable dam, players must take into consideration the conditions of the water stream such as the flow and volume of the water. Once the dam is completed, the game is ready to begin. The upstream team will ask the downstream team if they are ready once as a certain amount of water is collected. If they are ready, the upstream team will start to deconstruct their dam as much to the extent that the stored water will flow out and damage the downstream team's dam. As this is happening, to prevent collapsing, the downstream team will reinforce their own dam. If they don't succeed, the upstream team wins, but if they protect it from collapsing, the downstream team wins the game. When the round ends, the teams switch locations.

=== Garakji chatginori ===
==== Objective of the game ====
Players trying to find hidden garakji (hidden object).

==== Origin ====
The game is also called Garakji Gamchigi Nori. Garakji is a pair of big rings that married women wore. They are usually made out of metal such as silver or stones like jade. Although rings were typically used to play the game, other objects were used as well which then would change the name of the game. This game was usually played indoors during the winter time and is typically played by young and/or grown women.

==== How to play the game ====
The game is often played with about ten people. The group will sit in a circle and someone among the group is chosen to be the finder (sometimes called tiger or cat). The finder has to sit in the middle and covers their eyes. The garakji will be passed around under their skirts or knees as the people in the circle sing a song. The group must try not to show the garakji to the finder and be careful not to drop it. When the finder says stop or the song ends, they will start looking the garakji. In order to confuse the finder, the players sitting in the circle may try to trick the finder through their actions or words. The finder will point to a person who they think has the garakji or object. If the assumption is wrong, they must stay in the middle and go for another round. However, if the person with the garakji/object is caught, they are now the finder.

=== Hangung ===
Hangung

=== Nat Chigi Nori ===
Nat Chigi Nori is a game of throwing sickles at trees from a certain distance for it to hang or stick while cutting a tree and/or grass on a mountainside.

==== About ====
Nat Chigi Nori was typically enjoyed by grown children or teenagers. In the past, cutting grass and trees was part of the mundane every life of children in farming or mountain villages. Grass was fed to cows or used to make compost for farming, while trees were used as firewood. As such, cutting grass and trees was an important task in traditional societies. However, this kind of work was not done in a hasty manner and required some breaks, which was when the game was traditionally played. This game was played across the country with small differences between the different types. Typically, the one succeeding in throwing and sticking a sickle in the ground wins a bundle of firewood or grass. Under another rule, the one getting a sickle to hang on a tree, after having thrown it, is declared the winner.

==== How it is played ====
Starting the game, the players cut down a certain amount of grass, gather it into a heap, and fix a stick in the middle of it. According to the outcome of Gawi Bawi Bo, they decide the order of the turn and throw a sickle towards the stick. Players must give the whole portion of grass to the winner who succeeds at getting the sickle to hang on the stick, which rarely happens. Therefore, players were ranked depending on the proximity of their sickle to the stick, which often led to difference in opinions and, ultimately, scuffles in disagreement. The loser, whose grass is taken away, must stay behind to cut grass or trees, before returning home late. There is a variation of this game where players pile up their bundle of grass or firewood nice and high and throw their sickle from a distance of 3 – 4 m, one by one. A player who sticks the sickle to one's bundle wins. It is difficult to throw a sickle over a great distance in order to precisely stick a sickle to a stack of grass or firewood set at a higher location. The one to stick a sickle accurately takes all the bundles, resulting in some children routinely practicing throwing a sickle.

The game with firewood applies different rules as it is played on a mildly inclined slope, rather than on a flat ground. The starting point is then marked with a leaf of a tree or grass. This time, however, a sickle is not tossed, but rolled. The player able to roll a sickle the farthest wins all the bundles of firewood. A skilled player makes the hilt of their sickle shorter so that it can roll further The game eventually disappeared as people no longer cut down trees or long grass, however, it remains as a memorable game for those who spent their childhood in rural communities from the 1950s to the 1970s.

=== Squid game ===
Diagram showing playing field. It consists of five areas: (1) Offensive house (공격진영 gong-gyeogjin-yeong) (2) Promotion area for the defense (공격목표 gong-gyeogmogpyo) (3) Defensive house (수비진영 subijin-yeong) (4) Promotion area for the offense (승급영역 seung-geub-yeong-yeog) (5) Out of bounds (기타 gita)

Squid (Korean: 오징어, ojingŏ) is a children's game played in South Korea. The game is named as such because the shape of the playing field drawn on the ground somewhat resembles the shape of a squid. There are regional variations of the name such as "squid gaisan" (with gaisan thought to be a variation of the Japanese word kaisen 開戦, 'to start a war'), or "squid takkari". It is a multiplayer game, and the game is divided into two teams, offensive and defensive. There are two main purposes, either for the attackers to achieve the purpose of the attack, or for the teams to annihilate each other.

There are many versions of the rules for different areas and groups. Regional names differ.
