= Sport in Korea =

Korea has traditional sports

Korea has traditional sports of its own, as well as sports from different cultures and countries.

== Traditional sport ==
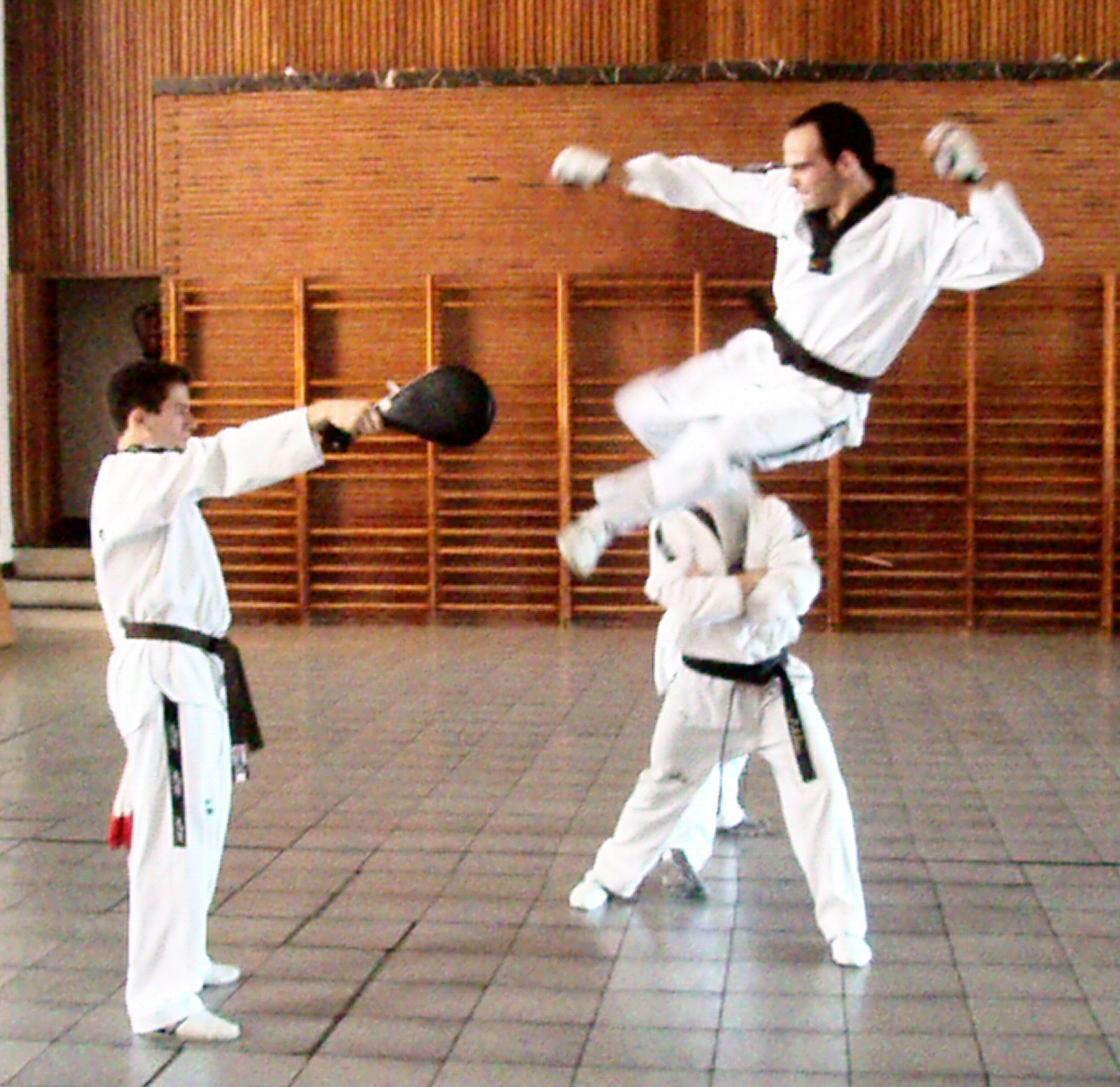
A taekwondo practitioner demonstrating dollyo chagi technique.

There are various forms of folk dancing still practiced in Korea. Although not commonly considered a sport, traditional mask dance drama is physically demanding.

Kite flying (Yeon Nalligi) is considered a sport in East Asia. Kites are flown during the first few days of the Lunar New Year and Chuseok. It is not, however, a major league sport as it is in Thailand. The traditional Korean kite is made of bamboo sticks and traditional Korean paper.

Bull fighting (Huangso Ssaum) in Korea features two bulls fighting each other. The bulls butt heads and attempt to push the opponent backwards. The first bull to move backwards loses the game. Many people tip on bulls that they think are going to win. The owner of a bull named Glamorous made 1.2 million dollars from tipping alone.

Korean wrestling (Ssireum) is similar to Sumo wrestling from Japan. Korean wrestling is played in a sandy ring, and the contender who throws his opponent to the ground wins a point.
