= Cha Hyung-won =

South Korean actor (1890–1972)

Portrait of Cha hyung-won

Cha Hyung-won (Korean: 차형원; Hanja: 車亨元; September 5, 1890 – July 2, 1972) was designated as Ingan-munhwage on 16 January 1967 for the Gangneung Danoje festival, which is an Important Intangible Cultural Properties of Korea. He specialized in Gwanno-Masque playing, a kind of pantomime. It was a satire of the caste system by members of the gwanno class.

== Life ==
Cha was born on 5 September 1890 in Gangneung, Korea. His father, Cha In-sil (Korean: 차인실; Hanja: 車仁實), lived in 132 dong Gangneung Seongnamdong. At age 17 he saw the last Gwanno-Masque playing at the Gangneung Danoje festival in 1907 before it disappeared late in the Choson Dynasty. As Gwanno-Masque playing was performed by a gwanno, an enslaved male in government employ. Cha denied that he was gwanno. After Gwanno-Masque playing was designated as an Important Intangible Cultural Properties of Korea on 16 January 1967, it was reconstructed by researchers. Cha was one of the masters who participated in supplying information about Gwanno-Masque playing from masks to performance. He died on 2 July 1972.

== Career ==
He worked as gwanno at the Gwannocheong in Gangneung province until the latter era of the Joseon Dynasty and he made the masque and had performances in the Gangneung Danohje. He participated in historical research about Gwanno-Masque playing after 1966.
