= Neolttwigi =

Traditional Korean seesaw-like game

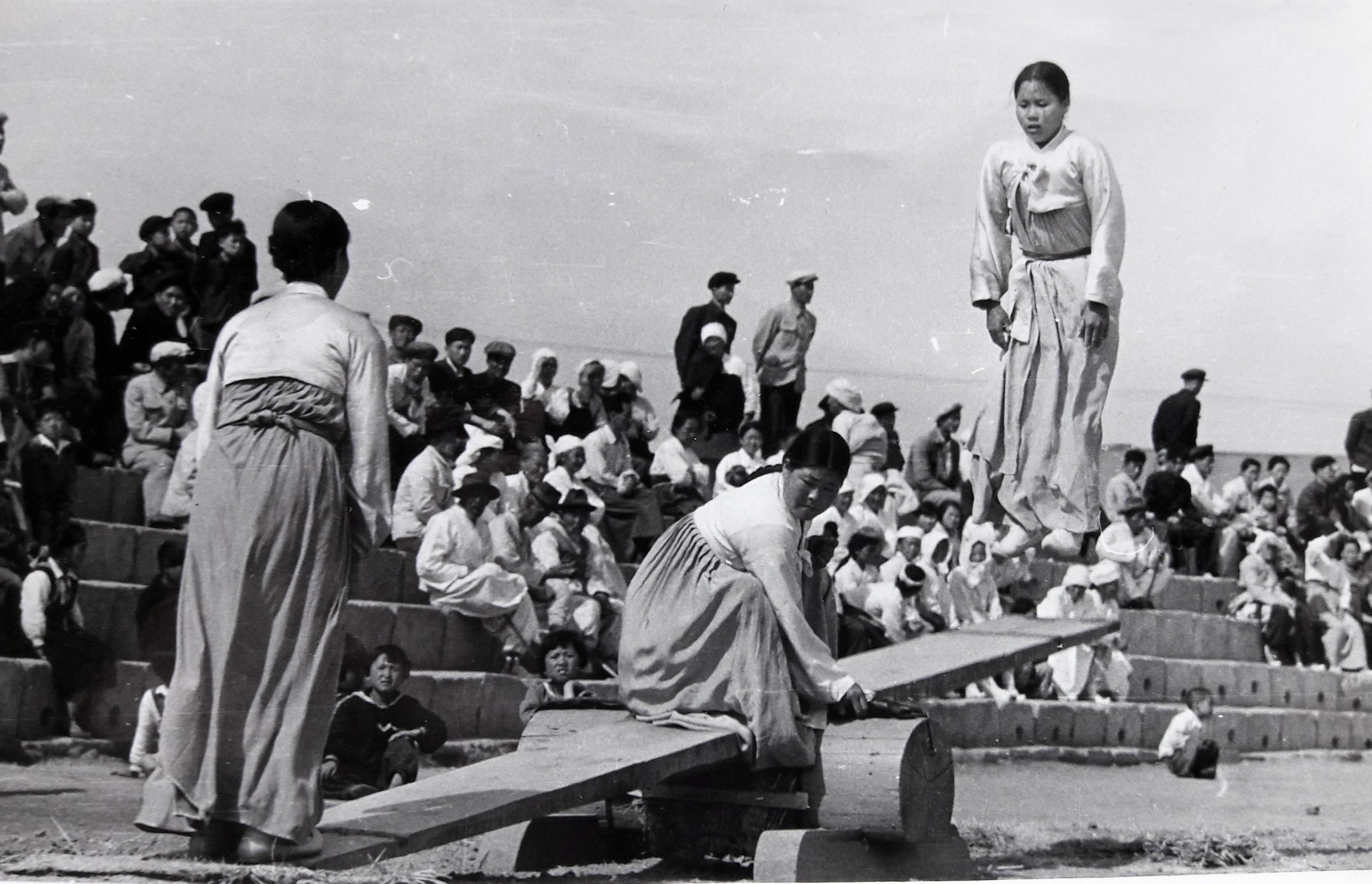
Women playing neolttwigi in Hamhung, North Korea (1958)

Video of the game being played

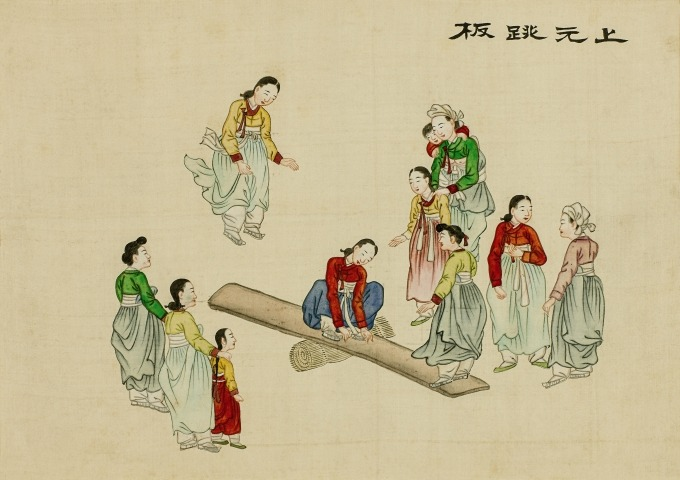
19th century genre painting

Neolttwigi or nol-ttwigi (Korean: 널뛰기; lit. board jumping) is a traditional game of Korea typically played by women and girls on traditional holidays such as Korean New Year, Chuseok, and Dano.

Neolttwigi is similar to seesaw, except that participants stand on each end of the neol (board) and jump, propelling the person opposite into the air. When performed as a spectacle, acrobatic tricks such as flips or skipping rope while in the air are often included.

It is thought that yangban women developed neolttwigi to see over the walls that surrounded their homes, as women in traditional Korea were rarely allowed out of their living compounds, except at night. According to a legend, a wife who wanted to see her husband, trapped in a prison beyond a high wall, could catch a glimpse of her husband's face by using a neolttwigi in collaboration with another prisoner's wife.

== See also ==
- Teeterboard
