= Darisegi =

Korean tradition indoor game

Darisegi is one of the most popular traditional Korean indoor games. It is also called darippopgi (leg pulling game). Its origin is unknown. As it is a play using body parts, it is likely that it has been around for a long time. In the magazine Hangul published during Japanese colonial rule, "I stretch out my legs and put them together, and say, "Indari~Gandanri, or Hangeori~Ingeori. "There is a record that the protagonist of the last remaining leg loses the bet." This game is a favourite among children. Dari Segi Nori generally involves singing a song with legs crossed, and counting legs with hands. At the end of the song, the game differs depending on how you take your leg out.

== Gameplay ==
The object of the game is to make the last player, who is unable to get his/her legs free, "it" or inflict upon that player a penalty. The game requires two or more players facing each other intertwining their legs and removing them at the end of a song sung by a particular player while counting all players' legs. One player sings the song for the entire round. Sometimes with different lyrics, players take turns in singing. The most popular starting line of the song is "igeory jeogeori gakgeon". The song should be repeated many times because the legs are removed one at a time when the song ends.

Children sit in two rows, stretch each other's legs crosswise between the other's legs, and count their legs according to the song.

There are two ways to play.

First, follow the song and touch the legs with your palms one after the other, and the moment you try to say the last word of the song, ('Ding' or 'Pong' or 'Kong'), the child who corresponds to this is actually pulling the leg. If you fail, you lose, and if you close it quickly, the next child loses.

The second method is to count the legs, then close the legs that correspond to 'Ding', and then count the legs again. While repeating this, the child who has both legs closed first wins. And when there is one last leg left, they sing a song alternately between the legs and the floor. If 'Ding' corresponds to the floor of the room, the board is invalidated.

After one leg counting is over, the last leg is removed and the song is repeated. Depending on the village, there are places to play with leg counting itself, and if one leg remains at the end, the person will become a tag and play hide-and-seek or play with rubber bands. There are also places where you can play Gunsu. The method of counting legs has little variation depending on the village, but the purpose of the game or the editorial composition of the song appears in various ways.

The player, who is able to remove both of the legs first, is declared to be the winner, while the other players are declared as the losers. The players who lost are then inflicted a penalty or are designated to be 'it' in a different game, or players decide their turn for the next game they will play according to the order of people able to remove their legs.

=== First way ===
To the song, pick up the legs one by one with your palm and count them. Then, when the song is over, they say 'Ding'. The moment the child shouts 'Ding', the child must quickly close his leg and take it out. Then the next child Ding will lose. If you cannot close it, the child with 'Ding' will lose.

=== Second way ===
If you are counting your legs while singing a song, and you get stuck in adding (or thump), pull your legs out. In this way, the child who pulls out both legs first wins. He is called 'longevity' or 'copper'. The person who pulled out the second leg is called 'chicken', and the next is called 'dog', and the person who has not removed the leg until the end is called 'thief'. The thief is penalized, such as dancing or running errands. When food was scarce, there were many penalties such as bringing dongchimi, sweet potatoes, and radish.

== Penalties ==
Penalties such as singing or dancing are imposed on children who are in the place. The songs that are sung when playing this game vary from region to region. For example, in Gyeonggi Province, "Hanaldae (1) Aldae (2) Samsa (3) Traveler (4) Yeongnam (5) Beggar (6) Taldae (7) General (8) Gudre (9) It is called Byeong (10)Dunggi (11) Ding (12)".

In the case of the Jeolla Province region, the song "Han-kong bean/soft mung bean/gamae tap/gold prize value/island perfect bean" is sung. In general, there are many areas where the song begins with 'this street, street, and gadgeori'.

Though Dari Segi Nori is completely different from rock paper scissors, but there are some similarities too. Both games are used to determine a player as 'it' or the ranking.

== Song ==
The song for the Dari Segi Nori, usually starts with simple lyrics of counting the legs in numerical order. But in the course of singing it starts adding more playful wordings and puns. These words and puns are changed according to the region and the person who sings it. Some lyrics change into words with undecipherable meanings. It might be a result of children imitating words that adults use or the names of surrounding objects, with words they know. The leg counting song that is sung while playing differs depending on the age of the game as well as the region.
