= 正月 =

正月 may refer to:

- Chinese New Year
- Japanese New Year
- Korean New Year
