= Lee Man-ki =

South Korean wrestler and television personality

Lee Man-ki (Korean: 이만기; Hanja: 李萬基 born in 1963) is a former champion Ssireum wrestler and Korean television personality.

In 1983, Lee won his first Ssireum championship and went on to win ten times. Because of his domination of the sport during the 1980s, even decades later Lee is known as a legend in the sport alongside Kang Ho-dong. Lee retired from the sport in 1990.

Lee was a guest in a November 2010 episode of 2 Days & 1 Night, where he and Kang Ho-dong had a rematch of their famous 1990 championship game.

Lee ran in the 2004 legislative election as a Uri Party candidate, but lost. He ran again in the 2016 legislative election, this time for the Saenuri Party, but was defeated.

In 2021, Lee was a contestant in the tv show King of Mask Singer and simultaneously released a single of his original song titled "Good Friend".

== Filmography ==
=== Television show ===
Year	Title	Role	Notes	Ref.
2022	Queen of Wrestling	Host		
2022–present	One Round of the Neighborhood	Host	Season 2	
2022	The King of Ssireum	Team manager	spin-off	
