= Gangneung Danoje =

South Korean traditional festival

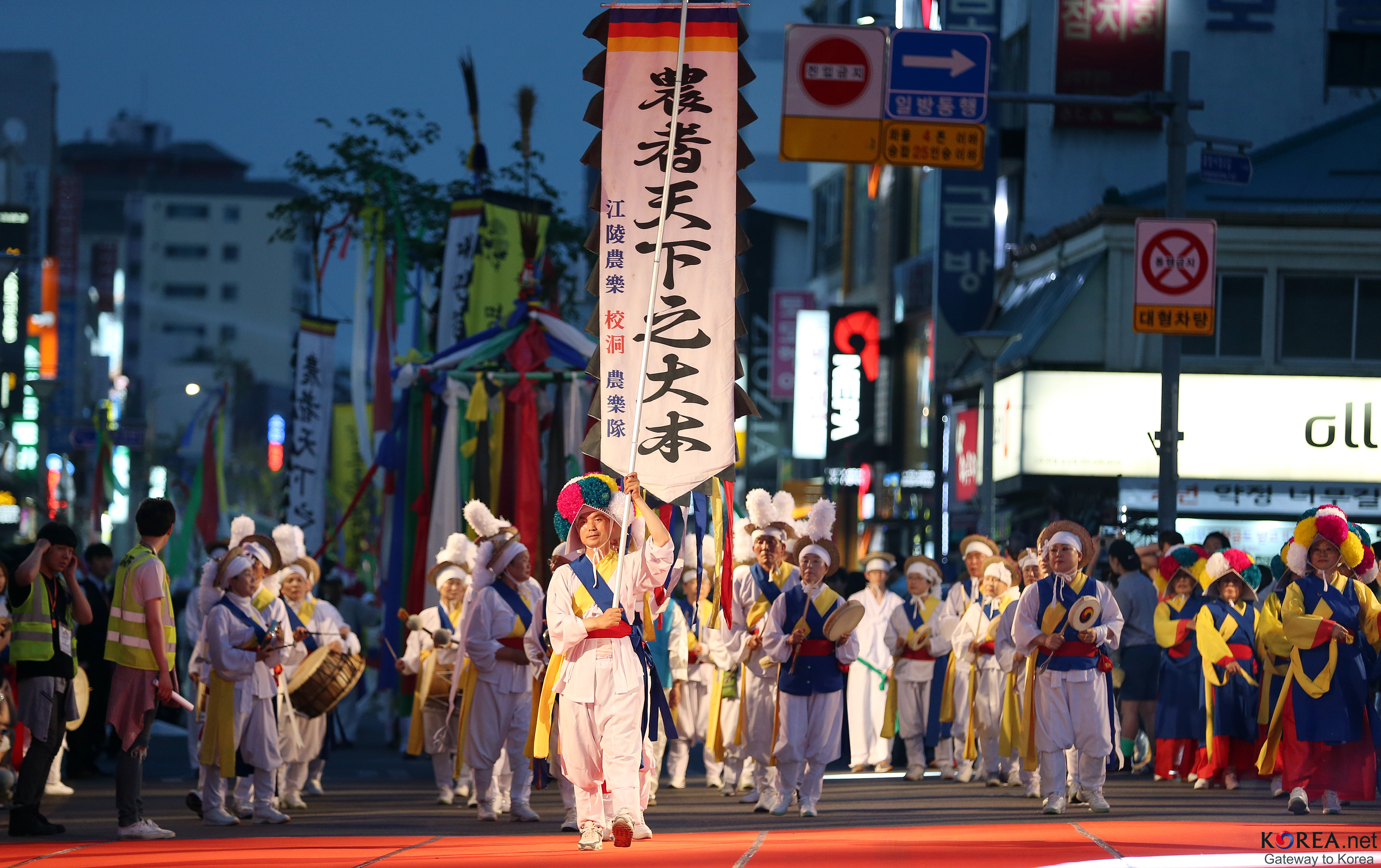
- A performance during the festival (2014)
- Observed by: Gangneung, South Korea
- Significance: Appeasing the local gods
- Celebrations: Korean shamanic rituals, Korean Confucian rituals, traditional performances, food and drink, bonfire
- Begins: (Korean calendar) 20th day of the 3rd month
- Ends: (Korean calendar) 7th day of the 5th month
- Frequency: Annual
- Related to: Dano, Dragon Boat Festival

Korean name
- Hangul: 강릉 단오제
- Hanja: 江陵端午祭
- RR: Gangneung danoje
- MR: Kangnŭng tanoje

Gangneung Danoje (Korean: 강릉 단오제; Hanja: 江陵端午祭), called by locals Danogut (단오굿), is a yearly celebration of the Korean holiday Dano, in Gangneung, Gangwon Province, South Korea. The festival is traditionally held for 47 days: in the lunisolar Korean calendar, between the 20th day of the 3rd month to the 7th day of the 5th month. Its purpose is to appease the local gods, and in turn to receive their blessings.

The festival's origins are unclear; it is at least 400 years old, and possibly has its origins in rituals over 1000 years old. The tradition was repressed in the 1910–1945 Japanese colonial period and nearly disappeared amidst cultural assimilation efforts. Beginning in the 1950s, efforts were made to research and recreate the festival in its original form.

It is now the biggest event in Gangneung. Since 1967, it has been a National Intangible Cultural Heritage of South Korea, and since 2005 it has been on the UNESCO Representative List of the Intangible Cultural Heritage of Humanity.

== Background ==
While the holiday Dano is celebrated elsewhere in Korea and even in China (Dragon Boat Festival), Gangneung Danoje is distinguished by its unique practices and long historical continuity. The festival has a mix of various different traditions, particularly Korean Confucianism, Korean shamanism, and Korean Buddhism.

A number of local deities are the focus of the festival. One god is the mountain god, who was once the human and historical figure Kim Yu-sin. Legend has it that, as a young boy, Kim was given a sword of mystic power by a hermit in a cave near Gangneung. He then went on to become a general of Silla, and led the successful unification of the Three Kingdoms of Korea. There is also the head guardian spirit of the city, who was another human and historical figure: the Buddhist monk Pŏmil. This monk is said to have protected people from pirates using supernatural powers.

== Description ==
The following is a description of the events of the festival, with dates given in the Korean calendar.

=== Stage 1: Ritual brewing of alcohol ===
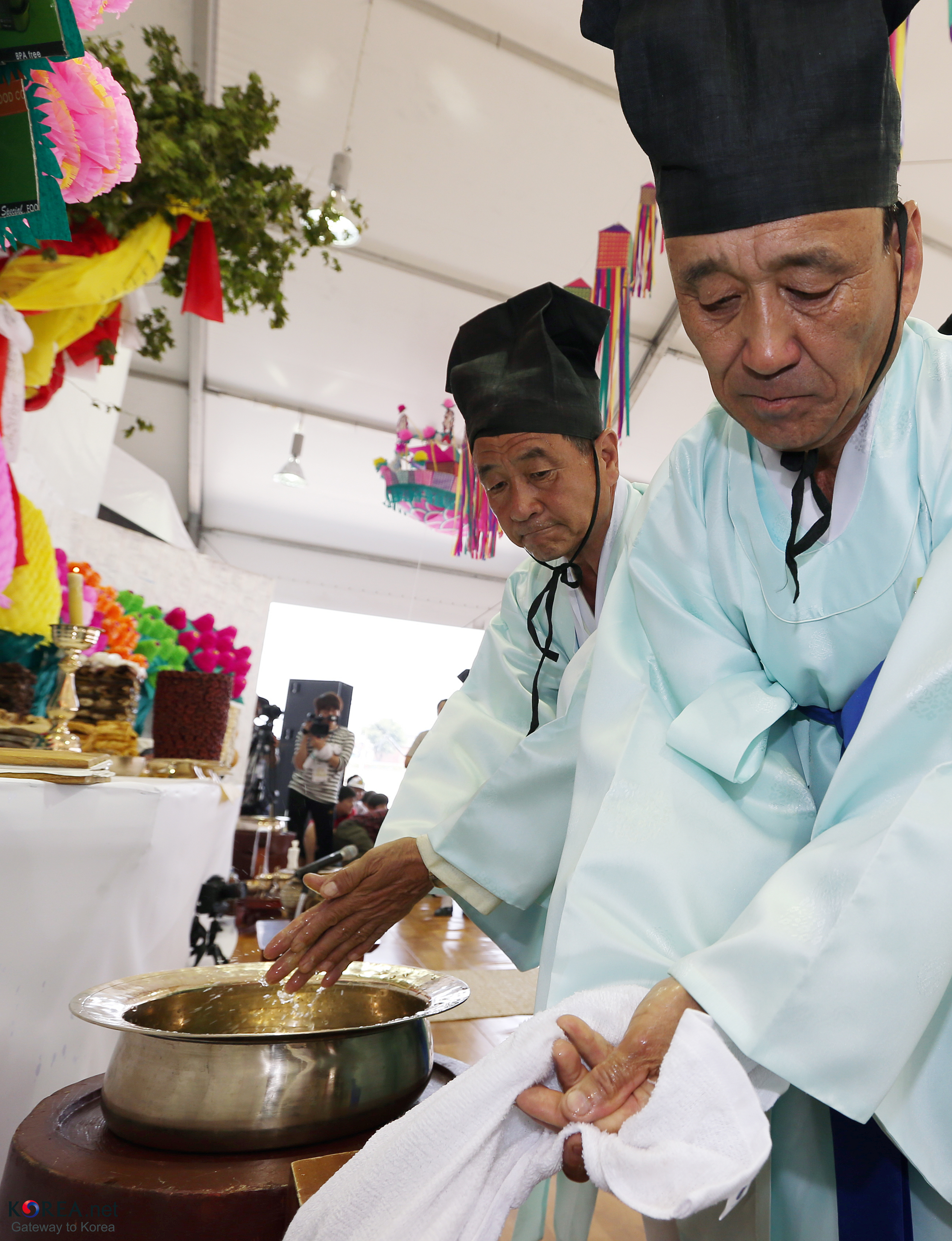
A ritual washing being performed at the festival (2014)

On the 20th day of 3rd month, the ceremony Shinjugŭnyang (신주근양; 神酒謹釀) occurs. It focuses on the ceremonial brewing of alcohol. Representatives of the city of Gangneung, led by a city government official, (Note: Originally this was performed by just the townspeople, but beginning in the Joseon period, local officials became involved. In the Joseon period, the ceremony was led by the hojang, now it is led by the mayor of Gangneung.) gather at Chilsadang (칠사당; 七事堂), a Joseon-era government building. There, they offer rice liquor to the gods and spirits. After a Confucian ritual is performed, they then begin ritually brewing alcohol. The local government and people in the community donate rice for this process. In 2023, 6,527 households donated a record 16,800 kg (37,000 lb) of rice. Then a shamanic purification ritual is performed. For several weeks, access to the brewing alcohol is restricted, as it is believed that people or animals could damage its purity.

=== Stage 2: Rites for the god of the mountain ===
In the morning of the 5th day of the 4th month, the festival's leaders travel up to a shrine to the mountain god (산신당; 山神堂) on the mountain Daeguallyong (대관령; 大關嶺). There, they participate in a series of Confucian rituals, and then there is shamanic dance and music.

=== Stage 3: Inviting the local guardian god ===
In the afternoon of the same day, people pay homage to the head local guardian god (국사성황; 國師城隍; Kuksa sŏnghwang) whose shrine is below that of the mountain god's. After a series of rituals, the head shaman goes up to a tree on the mountain, and brings from it a sacred branch (신목; 神木). More rituals are performed, to appease and welcome the god. From this day onwards, shamans perform daily rituals at the shrine to appease the god.

=== Stage 4: Procession ===
On the 15th day of the 4th month, the festival's leaders and the common people march with the spiritual tablet of the local guardian god and sacred branch. They visit various sacred places and shrines in and under the mountain. The procession is said to have 99 curves and valleys; it eventually arrives at a shrine (성황당; 城隍堂) in the village Gusan (구산; 邱山). There, the village hosts rituals and performances. In the afternoon, the procession goes to another shrine at the village Haksan (학산; 鶴散); this village is where the local guardian god is said to have been born.

=== Stage 5: Marriage of the gods ===
On that same day, the procession arrives at the shrine of a female local god, and hold a marriage ceremony between the two local gods. Their spirit tablets are seated side-by-side, and a 15-day honeymoon is held in the shrine.

=== Stage 6: Inviting the gods to the festival grounds ===
In the evening of the 1st day of the 5th month, after rituals and dances at the shrine, the tablets of the married gods and the sacred branch are removed from the shrine of the female god, and a procession is held for them through the main street of the city to the main festival grounds, the Danojang (단오장; 端午場). (Note: The female god is said to have been born and raised in the city.) On the way, the procession stops at the house of the bride's family, where a large feast with shamanic music and dance is held. At 7 p.m., the procession continues marching, until they reach it at 9 p.m. The spiritual tablets are placed on the main altar of the festival. Shamans play music and dance at the shrine.

=== Stage 7: Main events ===
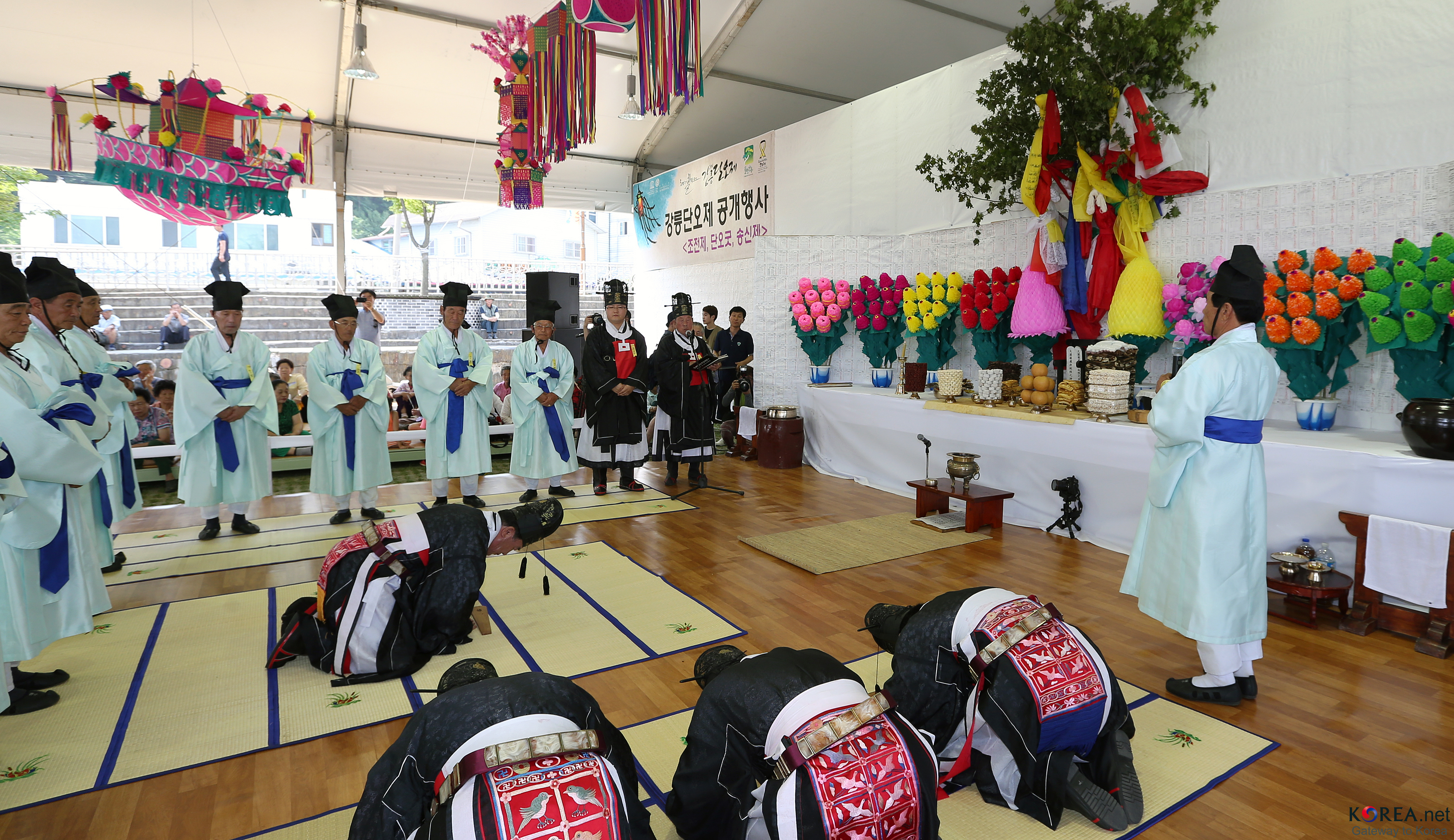
A ritual being held (2014)

From the 1st day to the 7th day of the 5th month, shamanic rituals, traditional mask plays, and markets are held. Each day, the festival begins with a morning ritual (조전; 朝奠). Shamanic rituals are continually performed throughout the day, with audiences going in and out of the main stage area. The shamans cover various subjects in their rituals, including filial piety, peace, safety, families, love, war, evil spirits, poverty, and success. Spirits are said to descend to the hall to listen to the prayers of people there.

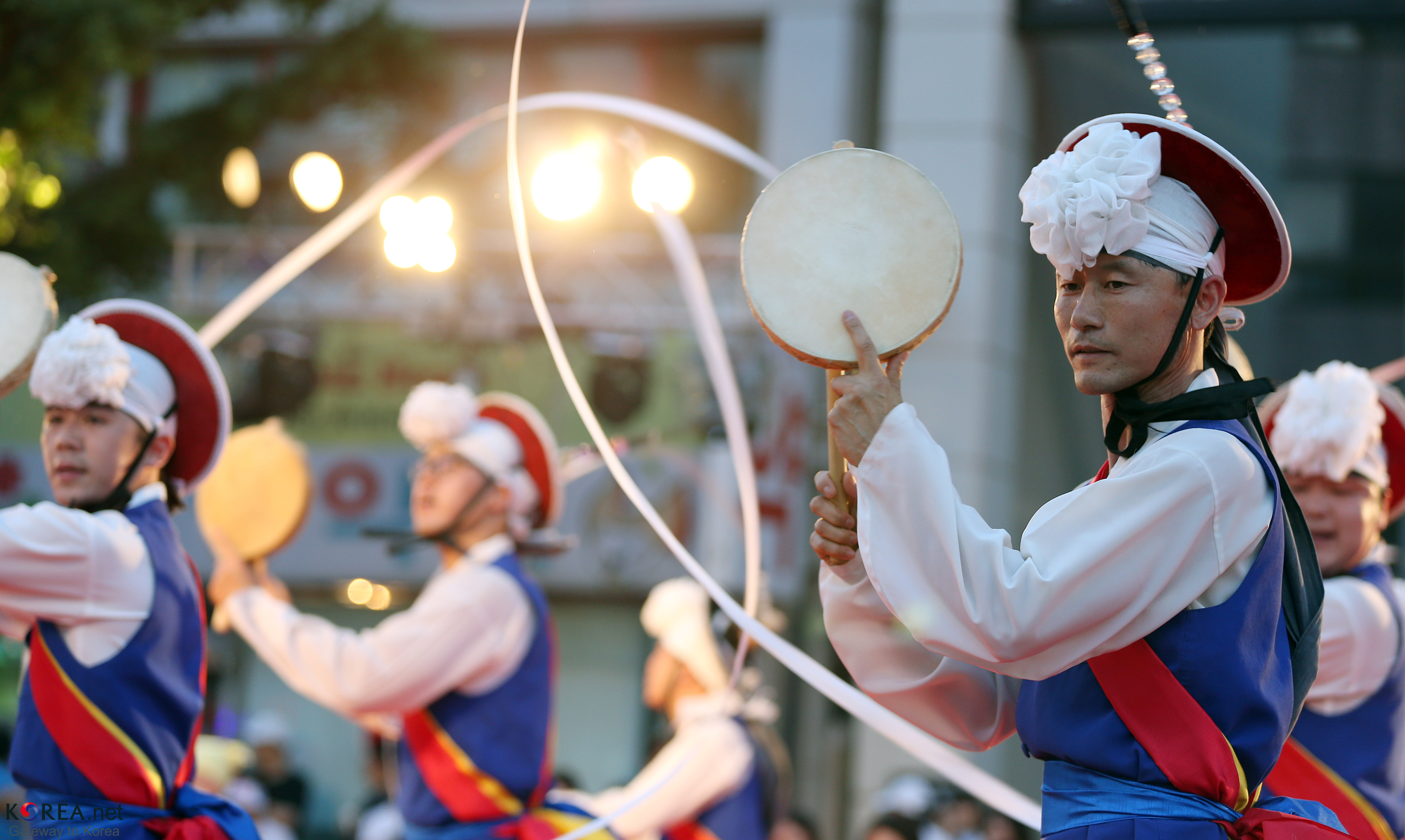
Musicians performing at the festival (2014)

Outside the ritual hall is an open stage for various performances. Guests have been invited to perform in this venue; for example, in 2007, performers from other UNESCO-recognized cultural traditions, including Wayang puppetry from Indonesia, the Mevlevi Sema Ceremony from Turkey, and Khmer shadow theatre of Myanmar, were invited. In 2005, traditional Korean games, such as ssireum (wrestling), geune ttwigi (그네뛰기; Korean swing games), juldarigi (similar to tug of war), began to be organized for this area.

Large outdoor markets, called nanjang (난장; lit. 'chaos'), are held, with food and drink sold in abundance.

=== Stage 8: Conclusion ===
On the afternoon of the 7th day of the 5th month, a Confucian conclusion ritual is performed. In the evening, a large bonfire is lit. Various ritual equipment used in the festival, including the sacred tree branch and spirit tablets, are put in the fire, to symbolize the return of the spirits back to the original places.

== History ==
It is not known when and how the festival came about. A mountain god (대관령산신) is possibly attested to by the 10th century, although there is some uncertainty if it is the same god as the one worshipped in the festival. There is an attestation to rituals surrounding appeasing mountain gods in a 1477 text called Ch'ugangnaenghwa. There is a definite attestation to the festival occurring in 1603; the scholar-official Hŏ Kyun recorded that he saw the festival then in his 1611 text Sŏngsobubugo.

During the 1910–1945 Japanese colonial period, Korean culture in general was heavily restricted by colonial authorities. In spite of this, merchants in Gangneung were able to convince colonial authorities to allow them to preserve some of the rites of the festival. It was only after the 1950–1953 Korean War that attempts were made to revive the festival. Many of the previous practices were forgotten due to the colonial period; scholarly efforts occurred for years to reconstruct the activities of the festival. Records from a Japanese survey in the 1930s and interviews from elders were used.

In 1967, the festival was made National Important Intangible Cultural Property No. 13. In 1973, an organization named Cultural Institute of Gangneung (강릉문화원; 江陵文化院) was established; in this group was a subgroup dedicated to organizing the festival. This group reportedly clashed with the Korean government at the time, which was reportedly in general unfavorable to folk customs, as it wanted Korea to modernize. The government reportedly became more open to protecting folk customs in the late 1970s.

During the democratization movement of the 1980s, folk customs became elevated to sources of pride. Around this time, Gangneung Danoje developed a position of prestige as one of the largest cultural festivals in South Korea. Federal and state support increased through the 1990s and 2000s, which led to the festival being listed on what is now the UNESCO Representative List of the Intangible Cultural Heritage of Humanity.

The festival is now reportedly a source of pride for the city. Gangneung is reportedly the only city to have consistently hosted a Dano festival even during the colonial period and the Korean War. It is also a significant source of tourism, with 623,000 visitors to the festival in 2023. One man reported that local companies would give their employees time off for the festival.

In 2021, the 13th Gangneung Dano Festival opened on June 10 and ran for eight days until the 17th. According to the Gangneung Danoje Committee, it consists of programs that present the direction of Danoje in the post-corona era. The meeting was held in the wake of the prolonged COVID-19 pandemic, with only officials attending.
