= Seesaw =

Pivoted board used for play

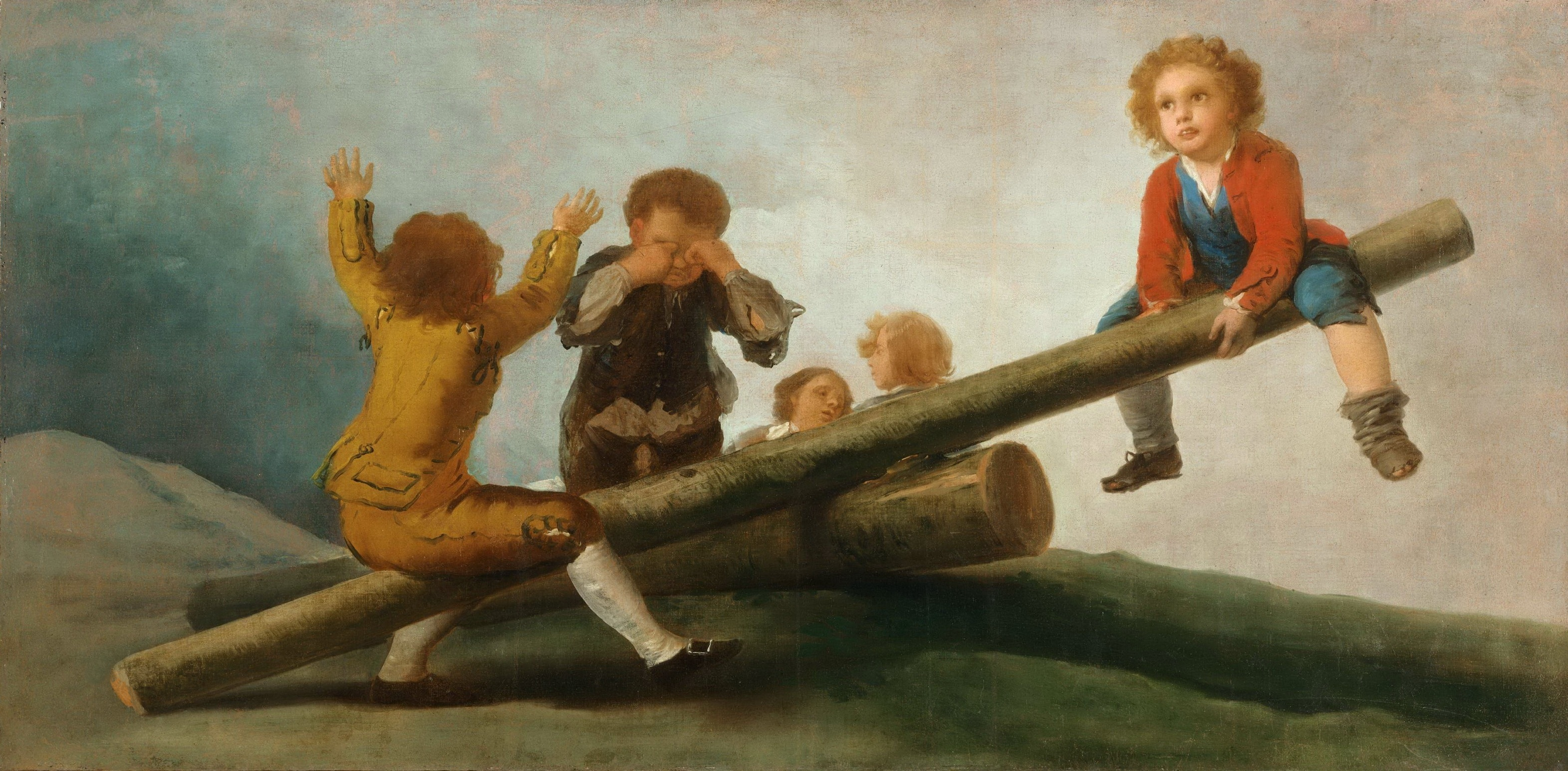
Seesaw in 1792 painting by Francisco de Goya

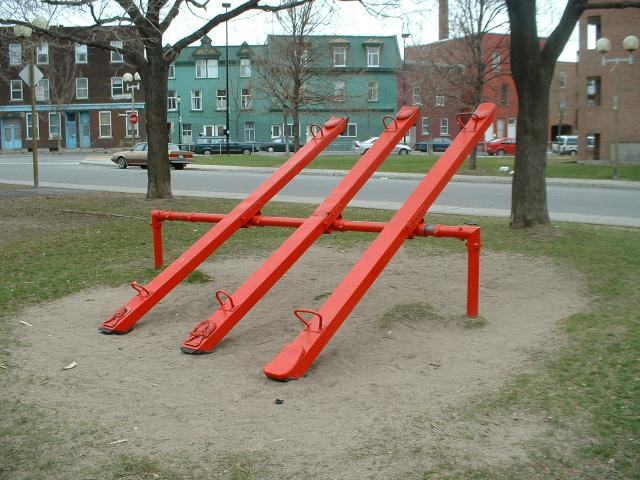
A set of conjoined playground seesaws

A see saw (also sometimes known as a teeter-totter in North America) is a long, narrow board supported by a single pivot point, most commonly located at the midpoint between both ends; as one end goes up, the other goes down. These are most commonly found at parks and school playgrounds.

== Mechanics ==
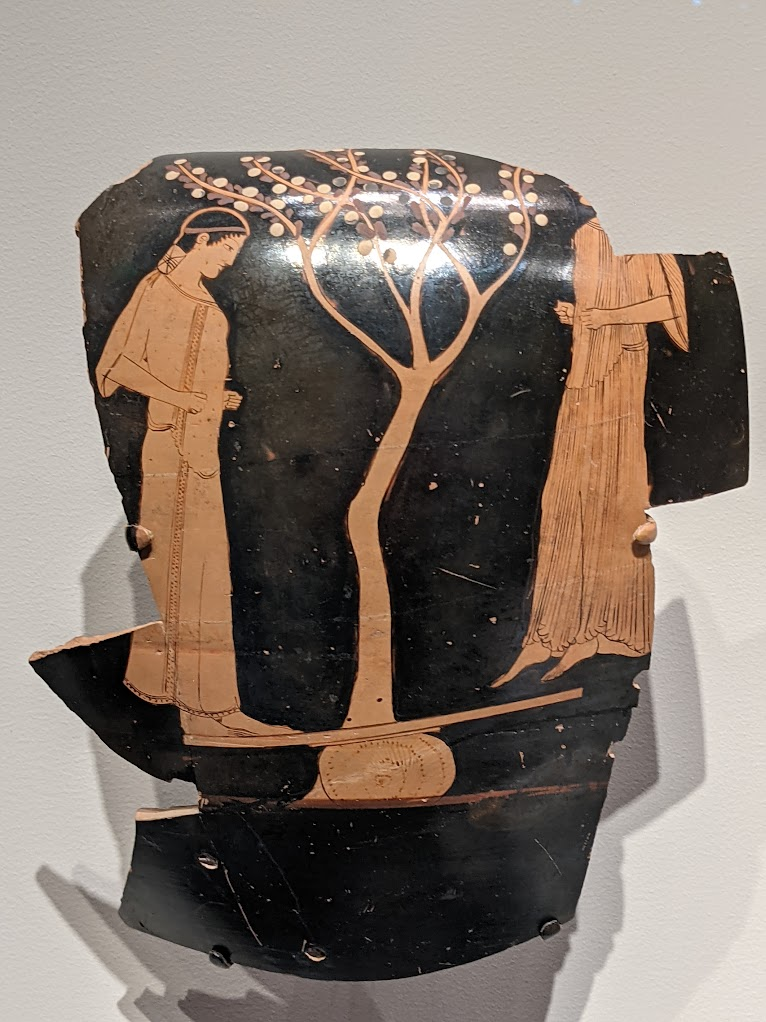
Fragment of an Attic red-figure krater by the Leningrad Painter dating between c. 470 and c. 460 BCE, currently held in the Museum of Fine Arts, depicting two adolescent girls playing on a see-saw

Mechanically, a seesaw is a lever which consists of a beam and fulcrum with the effort and load on either side.

== Varieties ==
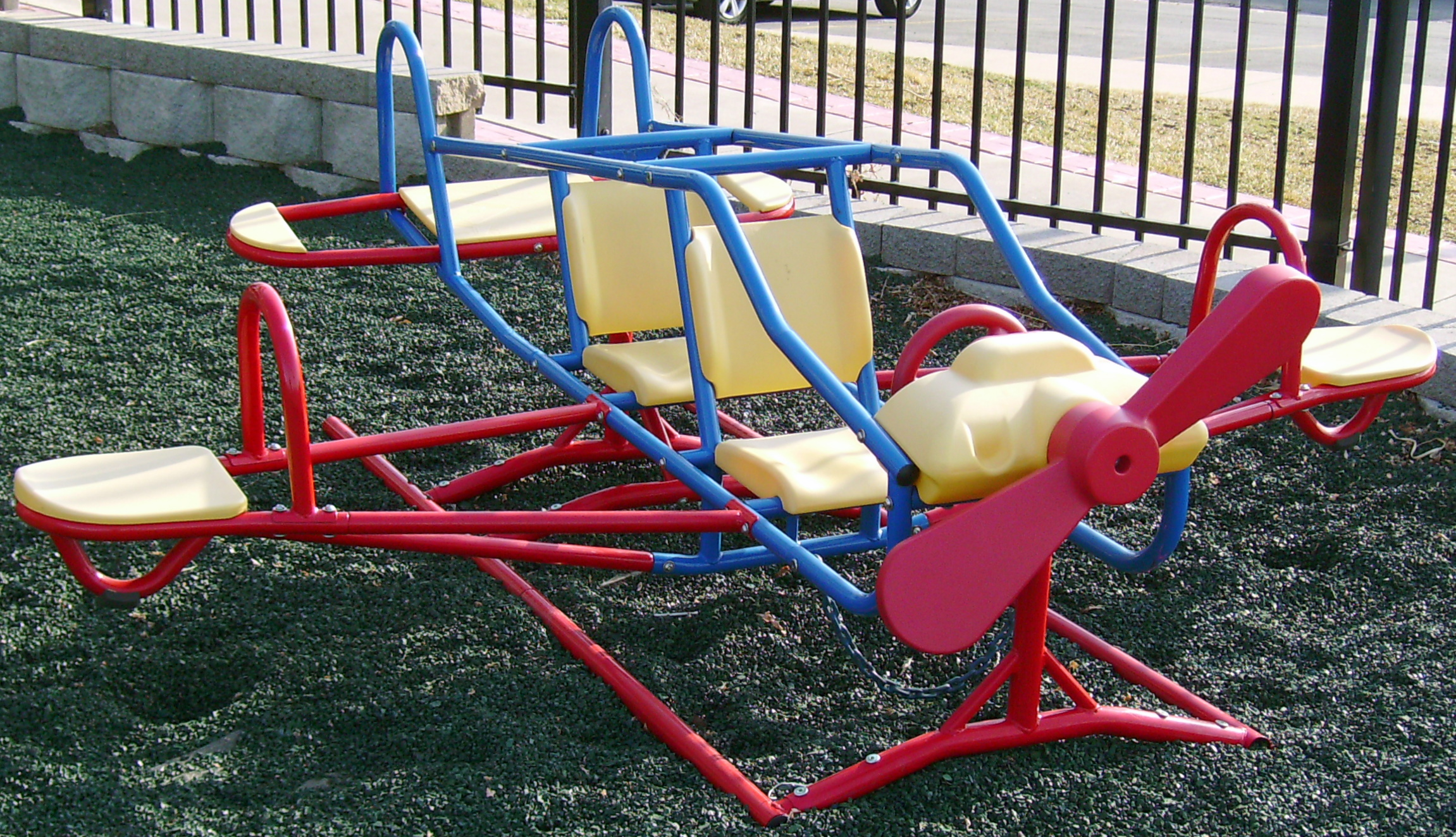
Seesaws are manufactured in creative shapes, designs and a range of fun bright colours to appear attractive to a child.

The most common playground design of seesaw features a board balanced in the center. A person sits on each end, and they take turns pushing their feet against the ground to lift their side into the air. Playground seesaws usually have handles for the riders to grip as they sit facing each other. One problem with the seesaw's design is that if a child allows themself to hit the ground suddenly after jumping, or exits the seesaw at the bottom, the other child may fall and be injured. For this reason, seesaws are often mounted above a soft surface such as foam, wood chips, or sand.

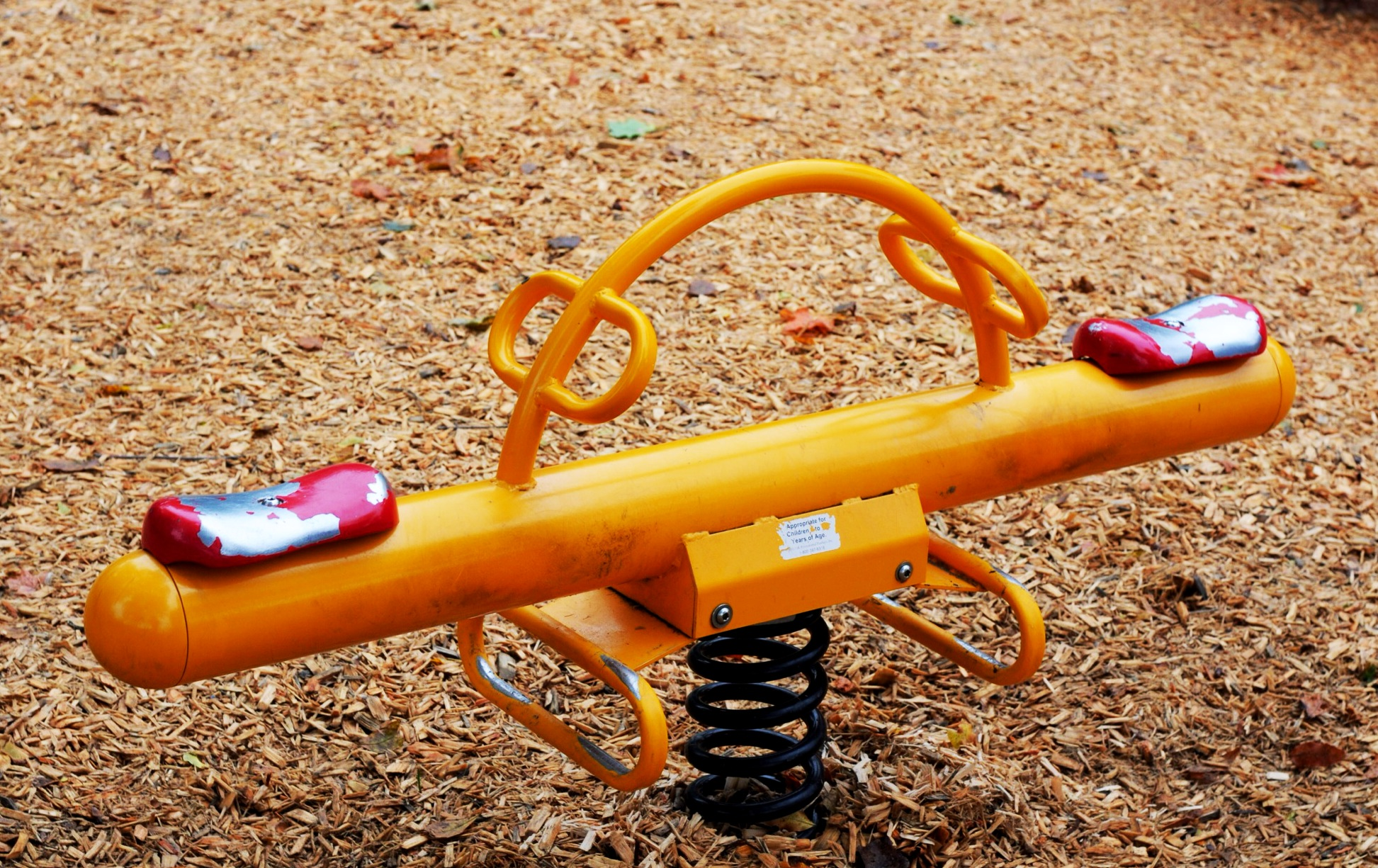
A seesaw in a children's playground

Seesaws are also manufactured in shapes designed to look like other things, such as airplanes, helicopters, and animals.

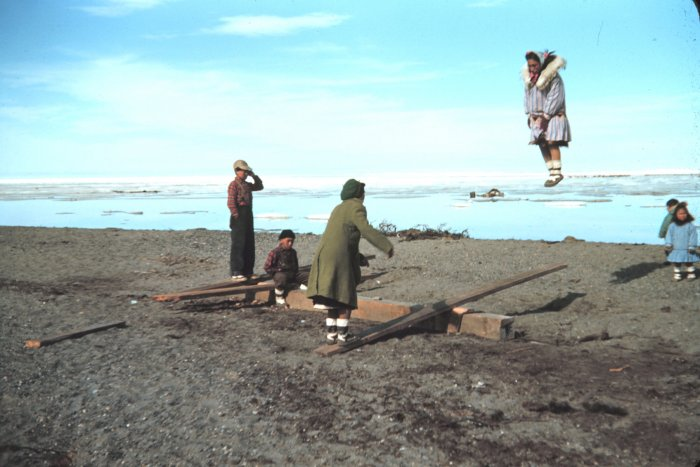
Makeshift seesaws are used for acrobatics

Seesaws, and the eagerness of children to play with them, are sometimes used to aid in mechanical processes. For example, at the Gaviotas community in Colombia, a children's seesaw is connected to a water pump.

In 2019, a set of seesaws were installed spanning the US-Mexico border fence between El Paso and Ciudad Juárez.

== Name origin and variations ==
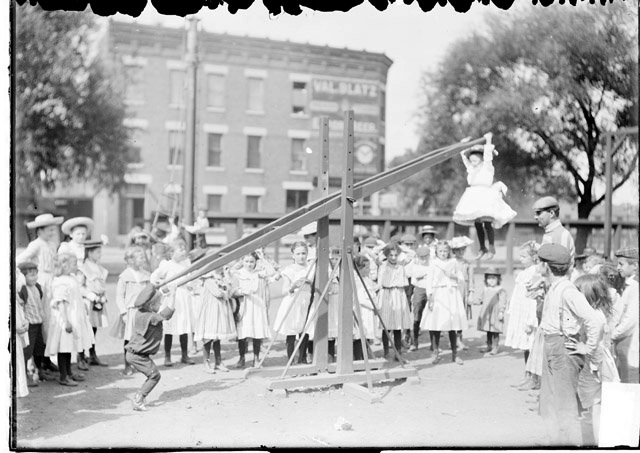
Girl hanging from a seesaw, Chicago, Illinois, 1902

Seesaws go by several different names around the world. Seesaw, or its variant see-saw, is a direct Anglicisation of the French ci-ça, meaning literally, this-that, seemingly attributable to the back-and-forth motion for which a seesaw is known.

The term may also be attributable to the repetitive motion of a saw. It may have its origins in a combination of "scie" – the French word for "saw" with the Anglo-Saxon term "saw". Thus "scie-saw" became "see-saw". Another possibility is the situation of the apparent appearance, disappearance, and re-emergence of the person, seated opposite one's position, as they, seemingly, "rise" and "fall", against a changing, oscillating background - therefore: "I see you", followed by, "I saw you".

In the northern inland and westernmost region of the United States, a seesaw is also called a "teeter-totter." According to linguist Peter Trudgill, the term originates from the Norfolk dialect word tittermatorter. A "teeter-totter" may also refer to a two-person swing on a swing seat, on which two children sit facing each other and the teeter-totter swings back and forth in a pendulum motion.

Both teeter-totter (from teeter, as in to teeter on the edge) and seesaw (from the verb saw) demonstrate the linguistic process called reduplication, where a word or syllable is doubled, often with a different vowel. Reduplication is typical of words that indicate repeated activity, such as riding up and down on a seesaw.

In the southeastern New England region of the United States, it is sometimes referred to as a tilt or a tilting board.

According to Michael Drout, "There are almost no 'Teeter-' forms in Pennsylvania, and if you go to western West Virginia and down into western North Carolina there is a band of 'Ridey-Horse' that heads almost straight south. This pattern suggests a New England term that spread down the coast and a separate, Scots-Irish development in Appalachia. 'Hickey-horse' in the coastal regions of North Carolina is consistent with other linguistic and ethnic variations."

Seesaw in Hokkaido, Japan

== Popularity ==
In the early 2000s, seesaws were removed from many playgrounds in the United States, citing safety concerns. However, some people have questioned whether or not the seesaws should have been removed, indicating the fun provided by seesaws may outweigh the safety risk posed using them.

== See also ==
- Neolttwigi
- Teeterboard
