= Seokjeon =

Traditional Korean game using stones

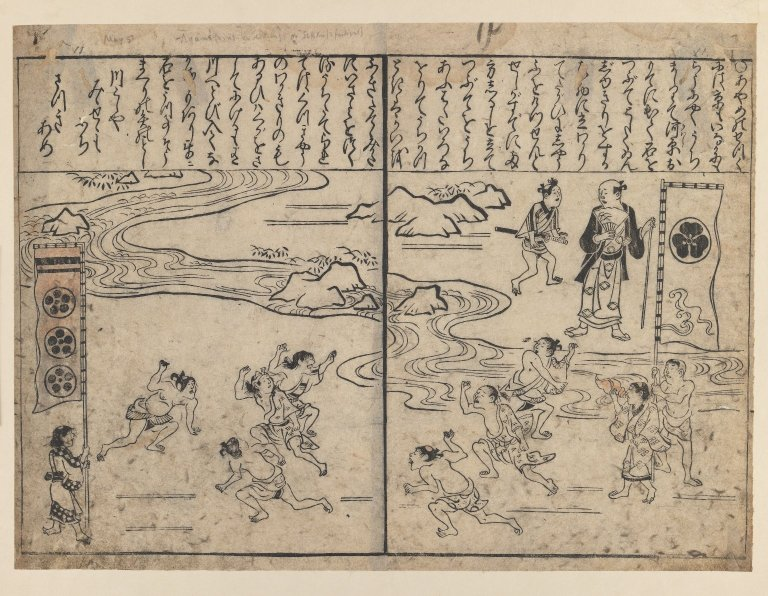
Brooklyn Museum - Ayame no Sikku - Hishikawa Moronobu

Seokjeon (Korean: 석전; Hanja: 石戰; lit. 'stone battle') was an ancient Korean ritual game or pastime. Originating as a form of martial training, seokjeon involved two teams of combatants throwing stones at one another. Slings were also used. Over time, it developed into a formalised game.

Similar games were played in East Asia by the Japanese, the Han Chinese and the Yi people. The practice was recorded as occurring during Chinese New Year, Lantern Festival, and Dragon Boat Festival.

== Korea ==
Seokjeon originated in Goguryeo. The first known record of the stone battle game (in the Book of Sui) describes it being played by the subjects of Goguryeo in the sixth century C.E. The king of Goguryeo was present at these contests, in which participants throw stones and shouted in an attempt to drive the opposing team into the Daedong River.

By the time of the Goryeo period, the stone battle game had become more formulaic, and had spread to the general population. Players would gather into two lines and strike one another with light clubs or tiles. The activity was still popular with royalty; King U of Goryeo is recorded as being an aficionado of the game.

Despite this development, the stone battle game retained strong ties to the military. Goryeo had seokjeon units in its military. Sejong the Great sponsored stone battles between military units, and volunteers for these events were granted numerous perks and privileges - it was even possible for commoners who signed up for such games to gain government posts as a result. Whilst still somewhat formalised, these fights were nevertheless a form of military training, as evidenced by the fact that Sejong deployed his stone battle teams against barbarian incursions in the north of Joseon.

As a result of royal patronage and military appropriation, the stone battle game became increasingly popular in the capital Seoul, where it was a common pastime during the festival of Dano. The high rate of injury caused the city's Correctional Tribunal to ban the game for a time, but it was still played in rural areas outside the city. A minor scandal was caused when three royal princes staged such an illicit stone battle in 1438, which led to numerous injuries and several deaths; as a result, King Sejong was obliged to banish them and tighten the ban on stone-fighting.

The prohibition was not lifted until 1469, by which time stone battles had again become a popular civilian game rather than a military training exercise. It was often played between neighbouring villages. Large crowds of spectators would gather for these events, which could last for hours or even days. In some areas the game was used as a tool for divination, with the outcome supposedly indicating how successful the year's harvest would be.

Stone battles could be enormous affairs, lasting for several days and involving large gangs of players. The cities of Gimhae, Seoul and Pyongyang staged particularly impressive stone battles, usually during the Damo festivities. Such events often came close to civil unrest, with seokjeon players in Pyeong-yang targeting the yangban who owned the land, stoning their houses and holdings. However, the stone-throwers were not always on the wrong side of the rioting; there are reports that the Japanese riots of 1510 in three Korean ports were quelled largely as a result of the skilled stone battle players who faced the Japanese.

Christopher Thomas Gardner, impressed by the "fondness for manly sports" in Korea, recounted seokjeon as told to him by a yangban: "In the winter the people have nothing to do, so the strong and brave men of all the towns of [Korea] come to [Seoul] to play and fight. The strong men of one town fight the strong men of another town. I go on the wall of the city to look. People must not fight in the city. I keep far away. Then they throw stones at each other, and beat each other with sticks. If they kill each other it does not matter."

The Japanese eventually suppressed the game during the early part of the twentieth century, blaming it for causing social instability. As a result, it has largely died out in modern Korea.
