= Yeonnalligi =

Korean kite flying game

- Hangul: 연날리기
- RR: yeonnalligi
- MR: yŏnnalligi

Yeonnalligi (Korean: 연날리기) is a Korean game. Yeon originates from the Chinese word 鳶, which means "kite". The game uses rectangle kites and is typically played on the Korean holiday Seollal. During Seollal, the kite is flown far away with the Sino-Korean word songaegyeongbok 송액영복; 送厄迎福 to fight against bad luck by cutting the thread connected to the kite around sunset. The word means to send off bad luck and greet good fortune.

== History ==
In the biography of the Silla general Kim Yu-sin in the book Samguk sagi, there is a record that at the time after a year Queen Jindeok of Silla ascended to the throne:

After the rebellion of high officials bidam and yeomjong, a huge star has fallen in weolseong, that the queen is scared and the hearts of the people that are governed are distraught, the general made a scarecrow and flown it with the kite to make it look like the star is rising back to the sky.

In Dongguksesigi, there is a story that Ch'oe Yŏng flew a number of large kites with methods of fire attached to quash the rebels of the nomadic Mongols in the Tamna province of Goryeo. It is also said that soldiers rode the kites to reach the enemy base.
