= Dano (festival) =

Traditional Korean Holiday

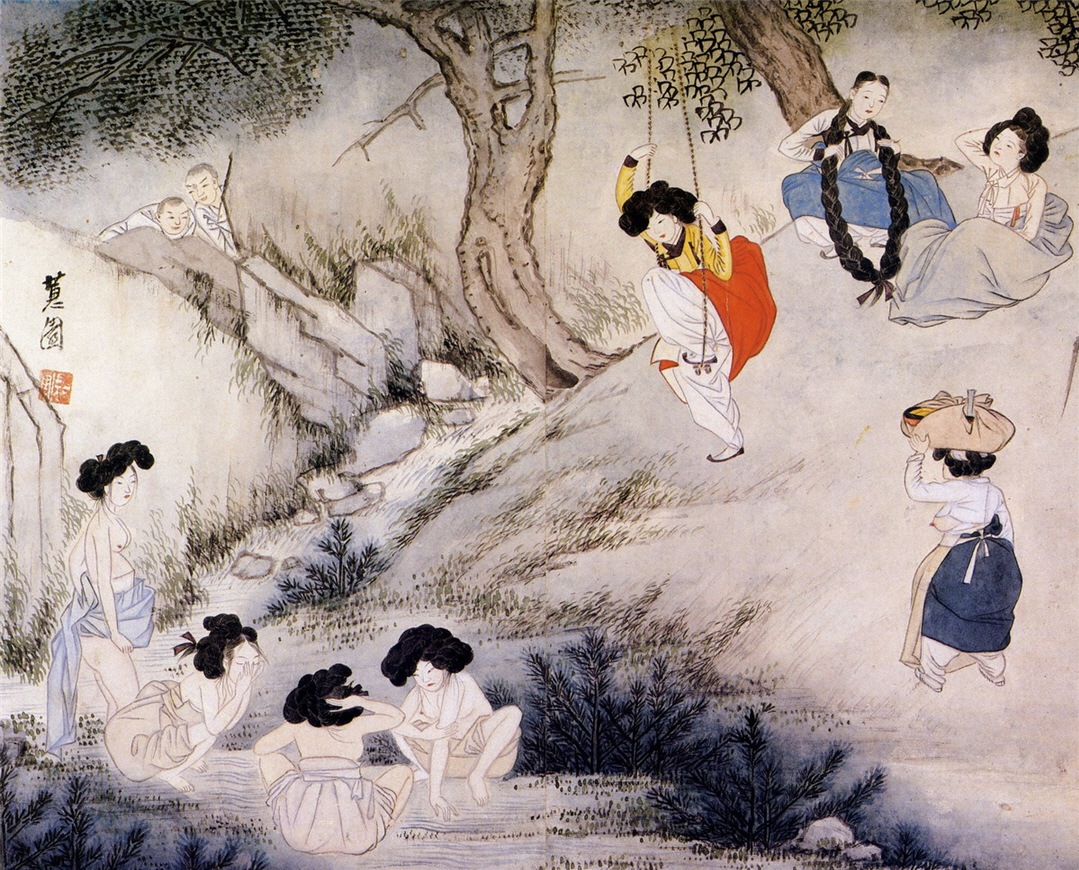
- Painting depicting Dano by Shin Yun-bok
- Official name: Dano (단오)
- Also called: Surit-nal (수릿날)
- Observed by: Koreans
- Type: Cultural, government
- Date: 5th day of 5th lunar month
- Related to: Duanwu Festival; Tango no sekku Tết Đoan Ngọ

- Dano
- Hangul: 단오
- Hanja: 端午
- RR: Dano
- MR: Tano

Alternate name
- Hangul: 수릿날
- RR: Surinnal
- MR: Surinnal

Dano (Korean: 단오), also called Surit-nal (수릿날), is a Korean traditional holiday that falls on the 5th day of the fifth month of the lunar Korean calendar. It is an official holiday in North Korea and one of the major traditional holidays in South Korea. South Korea has retained several festivals related to the holiday, one of which is Gangneung Dano Festival (강릉단오제), designated by UNESCO as a "Intangible Cultural Heritage of Humanity".

In the Mahan confederacy of ancient Korea, this was a day of spiritual rites and enjoyment with song, dance, and wine. Traditionally, women washed their hair in water boiled with Sweet Flag (창포; changpo), believed to make one's hair shiny. Women also put Angelica polymorpha (궁궁이; gung-gung-i) flowers in their hair out of the belief that its aroma would repel evil. People wore blue and red clothes and dyed hairpins red with the iris roots. Men wore iris roots around their waist to ward off evil spirits. Herbs damp with morning dew were once believed to cure stomachaches and heal wounds. Traditional foods include surichwitteok (수리취떡), ssuktteok (쑥떡), and other herb rice cakes.

Folk games associated with Dano include swinging, ssireum (wrestling), seokjeon (a stone battle game) and taekkyon (martial art). The swing was a game played by women, while ssireum was a wrestling match among men. In addition, mask dance was extremely popular among peasants due to its penchant for satirical lyrics flouting local aristocrats.

== Etymology ==
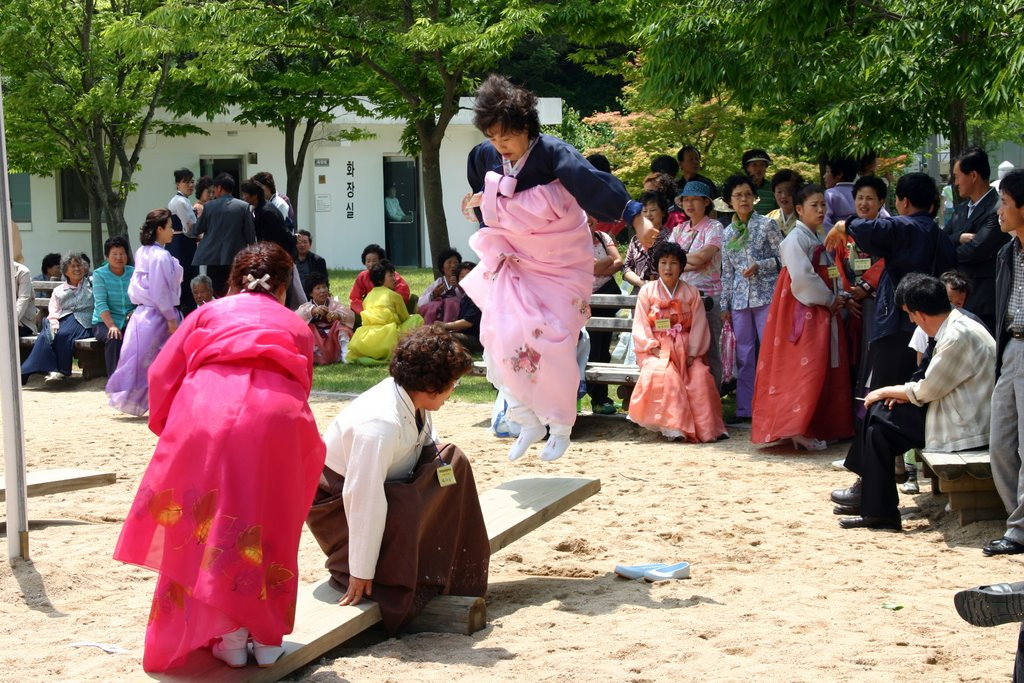
Korea Andong Dano Festival Seesawing

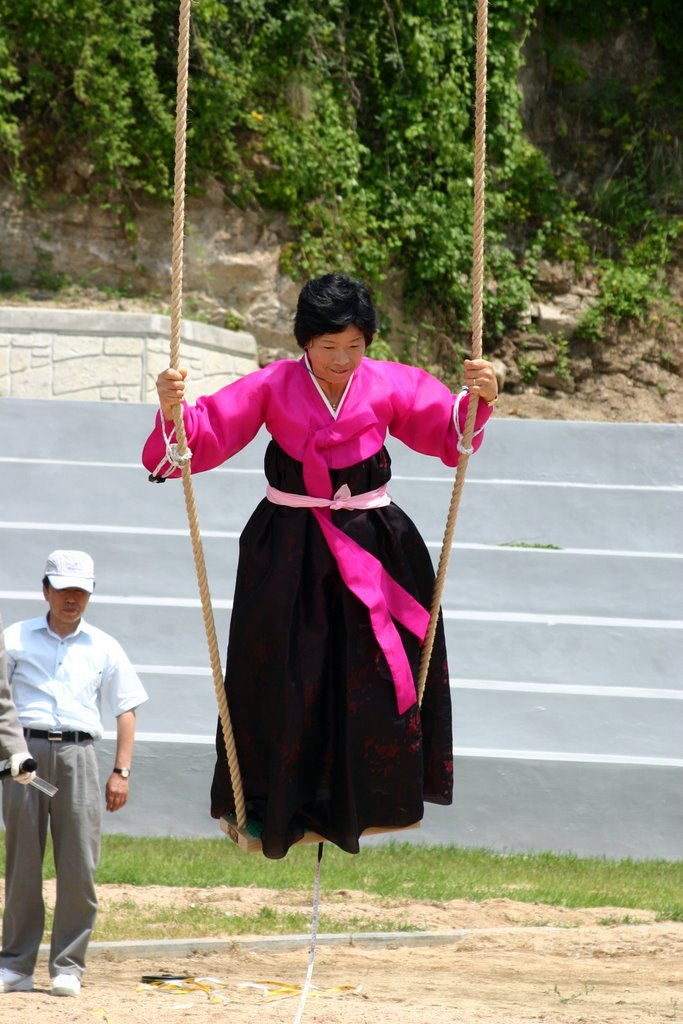
Korea Andong Dano Festival Swinging

Dano is also called Surit-nal, which means high day or the day of god. The word surit harks back to suri (수레; sure), meaning "wheel", which is why the rice cakes were marked with a wheel pattern. The term "suri" has alternatively been associated with the word for eagle (수리; suri), a common shamanic motif. Suritnal is also written in two hanja forms 戌衣日 · 水瀨日, but these are not etymological, merely homophonic.

Dano is a Sino-Korean name, derived from the Duanwu Festival. Other Sino-Korean readings for the date include 천중(가)절, 중오절, 단양, 오월절; 天中(佳)節, 重午節, 端陽, 五月節; Cheonjung(ga)jeol, Jung-ojeol, Danyang, Owoljeol.

== Origin ==
Modern history tends to characterize Dano to be a shamanistic ritual worshipping the sky deity in celebration of the end of the sowing season. According to the article A Comparative Study of the Tano Festivals between Korea and China, the people of the Mahan confederacy celebrated day and night with dancing and singing after the sowing season in May. In the ancient state of Jinhan, a rite to heaven was held after the sowing of the seeds in May. It is said this custom was passed on to Silla and was venerated as Dano. In the northern regions, living creatures wake from their winter sleep in May, so Dano was originally a holiday celebrated in the northern part of the country. Since the Three Kingdoms of Korea era, the ancestral god has also become an object of sacrifice. For example, in Gaya, Dano was one of five annual rituals for Suro, the legendary ancestor of Gaya. Since then, more emphasis has been given to the ancestral rituals.

The festival was syncretized with the sinitic Duanwu Festival during the Joseon period, adopting the new name Dano along with the exact date of celebration.

== See also ==
- Dragon Boat Festival
- List of festivals in Asia
- List of festivals in South Korea
- List of Korean traditional festivals
- Public holidays in North Korea
- Traditional Korean holidays
