= Ssireum =

Traditional wrestling style of Korea

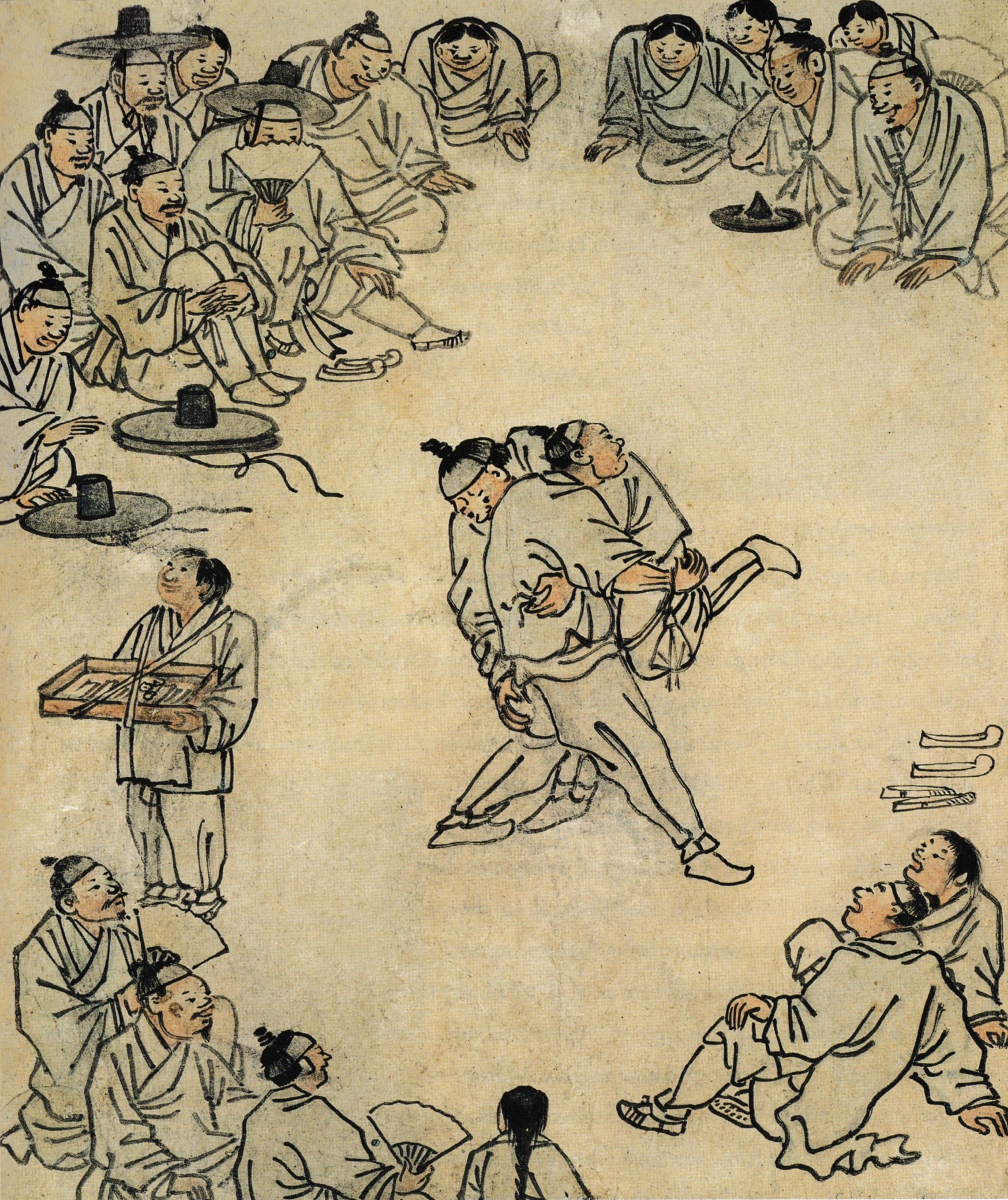
- The painting titled "Sangbak" (상박; 相撲) drawn by Kim Hong-do illustrates people gathering around to watch a ssireum competition in the late 18th century.
- Also known as: gakjeo; gakhui; gakryeok; gakgii; chiuhui; sangbak; jaenggyo
- Focus: Grappling
- Hardness: Full-contact
- Country of origin: Korea
- Creator: Unknown
- Parenthood: Historical
- Olympic sport: No

Korean name
- Hangul: 씨름
- RR: ssireum
- MR: ssirŭm
- IPA: [ɕ͈iɾɯm]

Ssireum (Korean: 씨름; pronounced [ɕ͈iɾɯm]) or Korean wrestling is a folk wrestling style and traditional national sport of Korea that began in the fourth century.

In the modern form each contestant wears a belt (satba) that wraps around the waist and the thigh. The competition employs a series of techniques, which inflict little harm or injury to the opponent: opponents lock on to each other's belt, and one achieves victory by bringing any part of the opponent's body above the knee to the ground.

== Etymology ==
There have been other terms for "wrestling" in Korean used alongside ssireum, such as gakjeo (각저:角抵), gakhui (각희:角戱), gakryeok (각력:角力), gakji (각지:角支), chiuhui (치우희:蚩尤戱), sangbak (상박:相撲), jaenggyo (쟁교:爭交). Gak (각:角), a commonly used prefix, seems to have originated from the combative act performed by horned animals such as oxen when competing against one another for the superiority of physical strength.

== Mechanics ==
Ssireum wrestlers seek to turn the opponent's torso from about 45 degrees to 90 degrees when throwing. This is mostly done by shifting the opponent's weight onto their leg then pushing back their weight toward the floor.

== History ==
The earliest evidence of ssireum dates back to the Goguryeo period (37 BC – 668 AD). Originally used in military applications, ssireum became a popular pastime of the people, including royal militaries, during the Goryeo and Joseon periods.

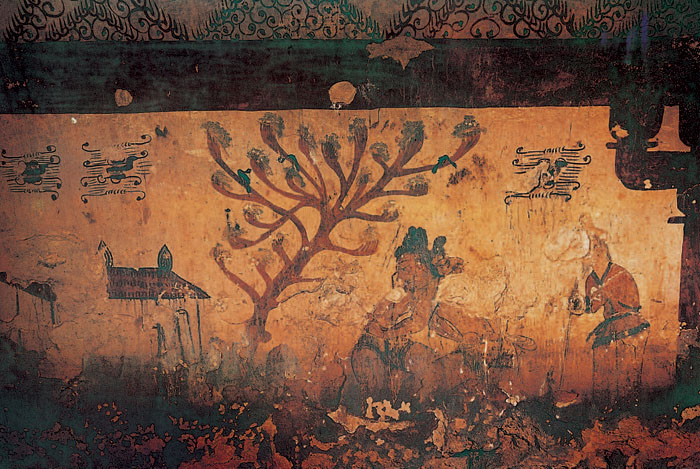
Ssireum depicted on Goguryeo mural (c.a. 4th-6th century

In traditional life, ssireum was a popular activity on the Korean holiday of Dano, the fifth day of the fifth lunar month, and tournaments are held in the summer and autumn. Ssireum competitions were also held on other days such as the Third Day of the Third Moon, the Eighth day of the Fourth Moon and Buddhist All Souls' Day.. The traditional prize at a tournament was an ox, a valuable commodity in an agriculturally based society and symbolizing the strength of the contestant.

In the 20th century, ssireum became a nationally televised sport in South Korea. The first modern competition was held in October 1912 at Dansungsa theater in Seoul.

Korean wrestling has been referred to as ssireum since the 1920s. The Pan Chosun Ssireum Association was founded in 1927 and held the annual nationwide contest until 1937. The First Pan Chosun Ssireum Championship was organized in 1936 and thereafter professional competitions were held for six consecutive years. In 1946, the Pan Chosun Ssireum Association changed its name to "Daehan (Korea) Ssireum Association". Weight classes were introduced in 1956 at the 12th National Ssireum Championship. The Korea Ssireum Association holds the National Ssireum Championship every year as well as the President's Cup National Ssireum Competition" (since 1964), Professional Sports Competition, Folk Ssireum Competition, and Amateur Sports Competition.

There are two traditional styles of ssireum: a "right-sided" style predominant in parts of Gyeonggi Province and the Honam region of southern Korea and a "left-side" style favored in the Gyeongsang and Chuncheong provinces. The difference depends on the way the satba is fastened. In 1994, the Korean Ssireum Federation proposed the unification of ssireum into a single left-sided style as the official style to be used by all competitors.

=== Cultural heritage status ===
Following an unprecedented joint application by both South and North Korea, ssireum was inscribed in the UNESCO Intangible Cultural Heritage Lists. It is also enlisted as the 131st Intangible Cultural Property.

== Method of competition ==
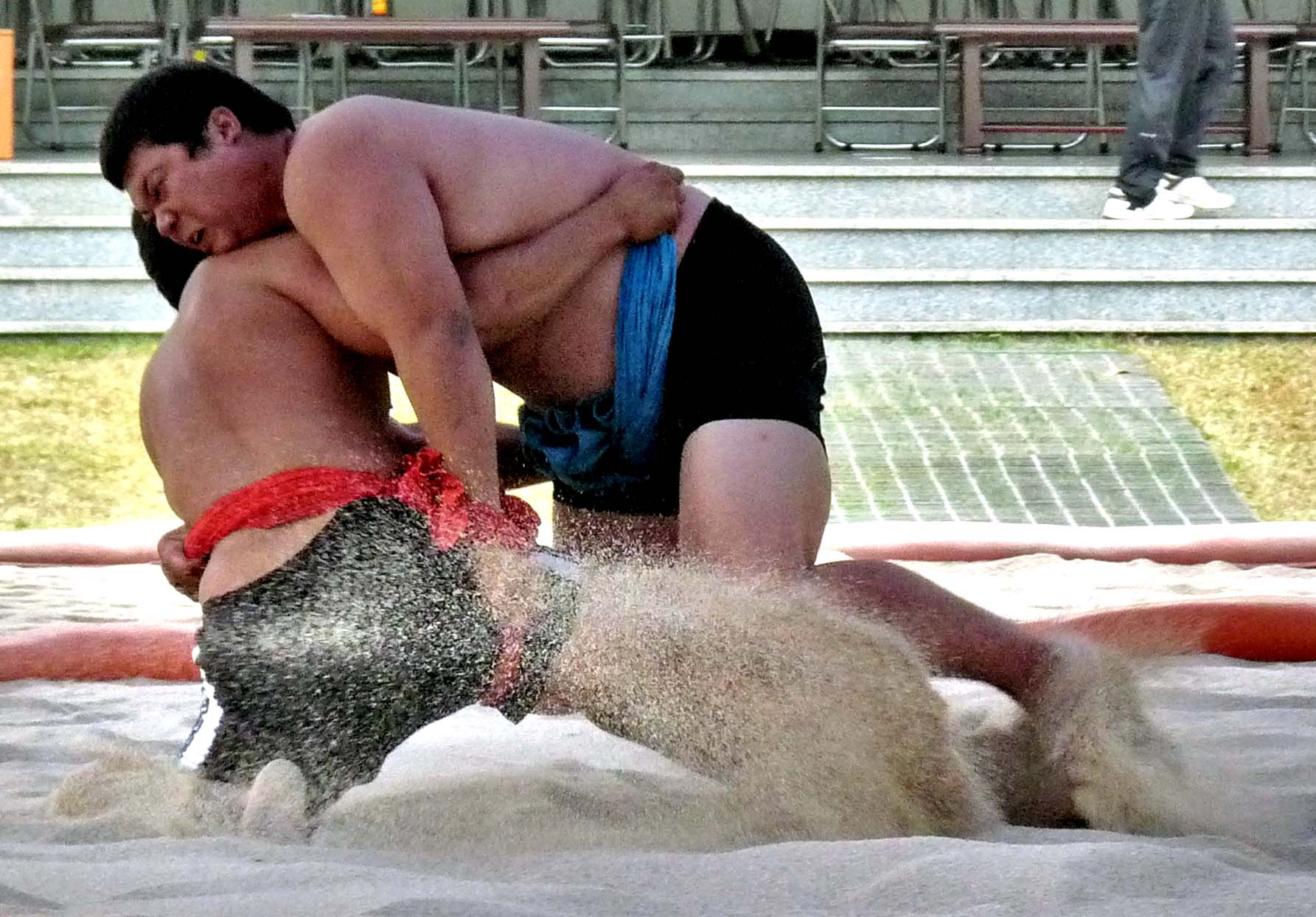
A ssrireum match at Gyeongju Citizens' Athletics Festival in 2008

Ssireum is conducted within a circular ring, measuring approximately 7 meters in diameter, which is covered with mounded sand. The two contestants begin the match by kneeling on the sand in a grappling position (baro japki), each grabbing a belt—known as a satba (샅바)—which is wrapped around the opponent's waist and thigh. The wrestlers then rise while retaining their hold on the other's 'satba.' The match is awarded to the wrestler who forces the other contestant to touch the ground with any part of the body at knee level or higher. Unlike sumo, pushing an opponent outside of the ring does not warrant a win, just a restart. Normally, professional ssireum is contested in a best-out-of-three style match.

There are three judges, a chief referee and three sub referees. The chief judge is positioned inside the ring, whereas the sub referees are located on the outside of the ring, one to the right and others to the left. If an unfair judgment is called or the chief referee is unable to render a decision, the sub referees can request a revocation of the decision or a rematch. In addition, they can recommend the cessation of the match when an injury occurs. The referees' decisions throughout the competition are absolute and held in the highest regard, meaning that athletes cannot challenge any judgments declared during the match.

Today there are also women ssireum wrestlers. Women wrestle only among themselves but follow the same rules (except that men are topless whereas women wear tops).

There are four weight classes in professional wrestling: flyweight (Taebaek, 80 kg), lightweight (Geumgang, 90 kg), middleweight (Halla, 105 kg), and heavyweight (Baekdu, under 160 kg), named after the four famous peaks in Korea.

Traditionally ssireum was contested with the top portion of the trousers rolled down to provide grip. The use of "satba" was invented with the birth of professional ssireum in the mid-20th century. There is a movement to restore this traditional method of grip, in the spirit of maintaining its cultural and traditional roots, but it has met with some resistance as the use of "satba" has become entrenched in the modern form.

The professional league is dwindling in popularity and many wrestlers have turned their attention to mixed martial arts fighting, even though ssireum involves no striking or submissions of any kind, as a means of making a living. Choi Hong-man, former champion of ssireum, enjoyed notable success in the K-1 scene. Unfortunately, the future of professional ssireum remains bleak, with only one team remaining. However, it can also be argued that ssireum is beginning to undergo global expansion as a popular martial arts sport, alongside taekwondo and hapkido.

Ssireum has remained largely a national/traditional sport. Physical hits such as slaps and blows are not permitted in ssireum, though they are in sumo. In both sports, the competitors are often quite large, though Korean wrestlers tend to be leaner. However, size does not guarantee success in either sport. Although both sports are quite similar, they differ in characteristics as well as values.

The national governing body of the sport in Korea, Korean Ssireum Organisation, has made a claim that ssireum is characterised as a "peaceful competition focusing on harmony and unison", reflecting the "philosophical outlook of the Koreans".

== Events ==
=== World Championships ===
The first World Ssireum Championships were held in September 2008 during the Busan World TreX-Games, but these were unofficial competitions. The official first championships were held in Siauliai, Lithuania, and a total of 120 wrestlers from 40 countries participated in the two-day event, according to the World Ssireum Federation (WSF). The first Asia Ssireum Championship and fifth World Ssireum Championship took place simultaneously at Thuwana National Indoor Stadium in Yangon, Myanmar, from September 18 to 23 of 2015.

Edition	Year	Host city	Men's champions	Women's champions	Ref.
1	2009	(Lithuania) Šiauliai	(Switzerland) Tullio Pachmann (90 kg) (South Korea) Chae Hee-kwan (+90 kg)	Not held	
2	2011	(South Korea) Busan	(Ukraine) Valerii Komar (90 kg) (South Korea) Chae Hee-kwan (130 kg)	(China) Jin Mehua (60 kg) (South Korea) Lim Su-jeong (80 kg)	
3	2012	(South Korea) Busan	(South Korea) Choi Sang-geun (80 kg) (South Korea) Lee Eol (100 kg) (Ukraine) Andriy Nikitchenko (130 kg)	(South Korea) Seo Hyun (65 kg) (South Korea) Lim Su-jeong (80 kg)	
4	2013	(Germany) Frankfurt	(Georgia (country)) Davit Karbelashivili (90 kg) (Finland) Matti Hämäläinen (105 kg)	(Ukraine) Viktoriia Sukretna (60 kg) (Germany) Elena Balzer (70 kg)	
5	2015	(Myanmar) Yangon	(China) Yu Zejun (70 kg) (Uzbekistan) Alisher Khudayberdiev (80 kg) (Mongolia) Uuganbaatar Myagmarsuren (90 kg) (Ukraine) Valerii Komar (100 kg) (Mongolia) Tamir Darmaa (120 kg)	(China) Zhang Yueping (50 kg) (Vietnam) Nguyễn Thị Yến Trinh (60 kg) (Mongolia) Khulan Batbaatar (70 kg)	

=== Korean Championship (unlimited) ===
The Korean Ssireum Championships have unlimited weight classes in addition to four weight classes. The champions of this class are called the "Cheonhajangsa". (천하장사; 天下壯士; meaning the strongest man under the sky)

Edition	Year	Champion
1	1983	Lee Man-ki
2	1983	Lee Man-ki (2)
3	1984	Jang Ji-young
4	1984	Lee Man-ki (3)
5	1984	Lee Jun-hee
6	1985	Lee Man-ki (4)
7	1985	Lee Man-ki (5)
8	1985	Lee Jun-hee (2)
9	1986	Lee Man-ki (6)
10	1986	Lee Bong-geol
11	1986	Lee Man-ki (7)
12	1987	Lee Bong-geol (2)
13	1987	Lee Jun-hee (3)
14	1988	Lee Man-ki (8)
15	1988	Lee Man-ki (9)
16	1989	Lee Man-ki (10)
17	1989	Kim Chil-gyu
18	1990	Kang Ho-dong
19	1990	Kang Ho-dong (2)
20	1990	Kang Ho-dong (3)

Edition	Year	Champion
21	1991	Hwang Dae-woong
22	1991	Hwang Dae-woong (2)
23	1991	Kang Ho-dong (4)
24	1992	Kang Ho-dong (5)
25	1992	Lim Yong-je
26	1992	Kim Jung-pil
27	1993	Kim Jung-pil (2)
28	1993	Baek Seung-il
29	1993	Baek Seung-il (2)
30	1994	Shin Bong-min
31	1994	Baek Seung-il (3)
32	1994	Lee Tae-hyun
33	1995	Kim Kyung-soo
34	1996	Kim Kyung-soo (2)
35	1997	Shin Bong-min (2)
36	1998	Kim Young-hyun
37	1999	Kim Young-hyun (2)
38	2000	Lee Tae-hyun (2)
39	2001	Hwang Kyu-hyun
40	2002	Lee Tae-hyun (3)

Edition	Year	Champion
41	2003	Choi Hong-man
42	2004	Kim Young-hyun (3)
43	2008	Yoon Jung-su
44	2009	Hwang Gyu-yeon
45	2011	Lee Seul-ki
46	2012	Yoon Jung-su (2)
47	2013	Lee Seul-ki (2)
48	2014	Jung Kyung-jin
49	2015	Jung Chang-jo
50	2016	Jang Sung-bok
51	2017	Kim Jin
52	2018	Park Jung-seok
53	2019	Jang Sung-woo
54	2020	Jang Sung-woo (2)
55	2021	Kim Chan-young
56	2022	Kim Min-jae

== Gallery ==
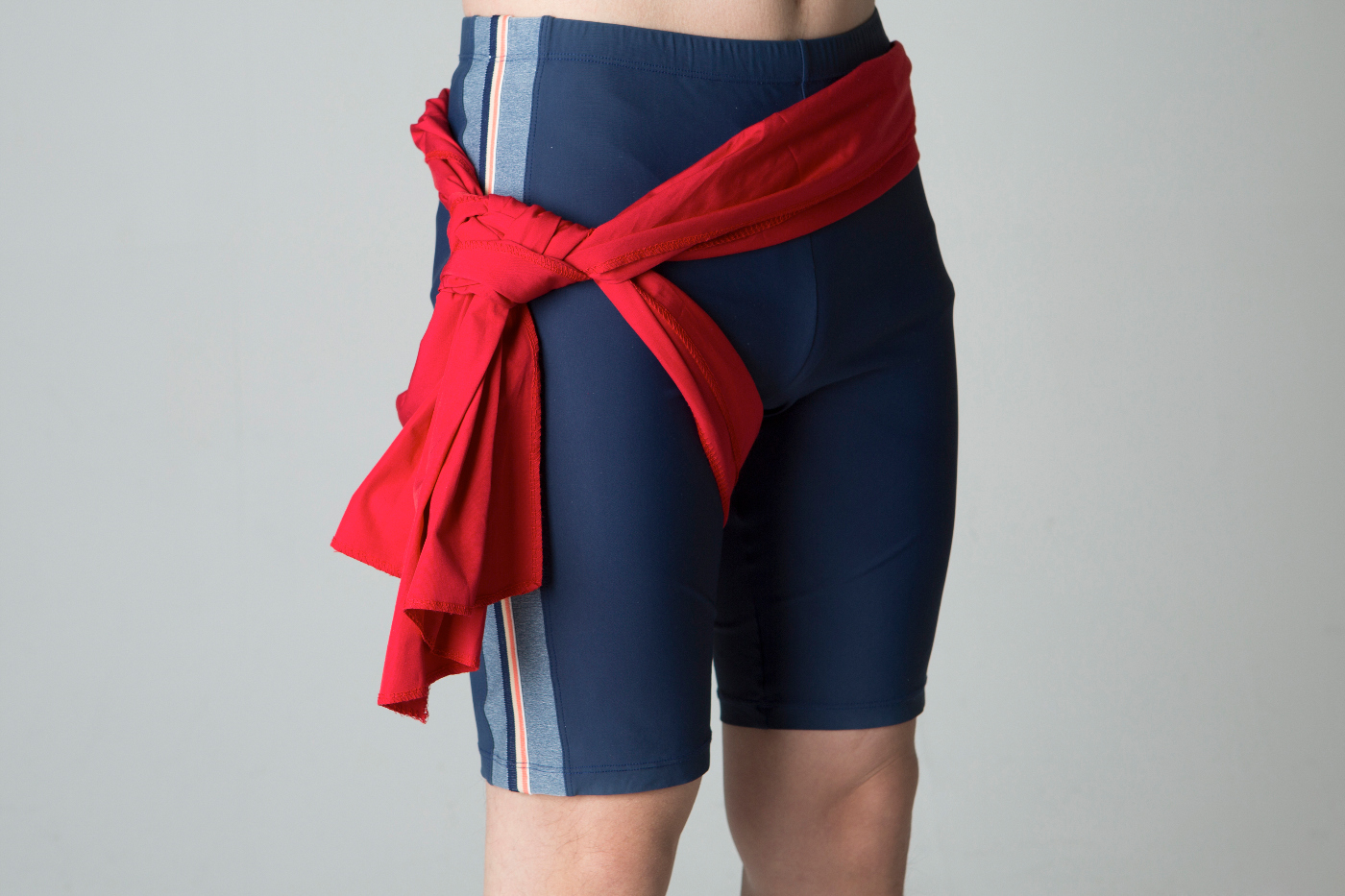
Satba (side)

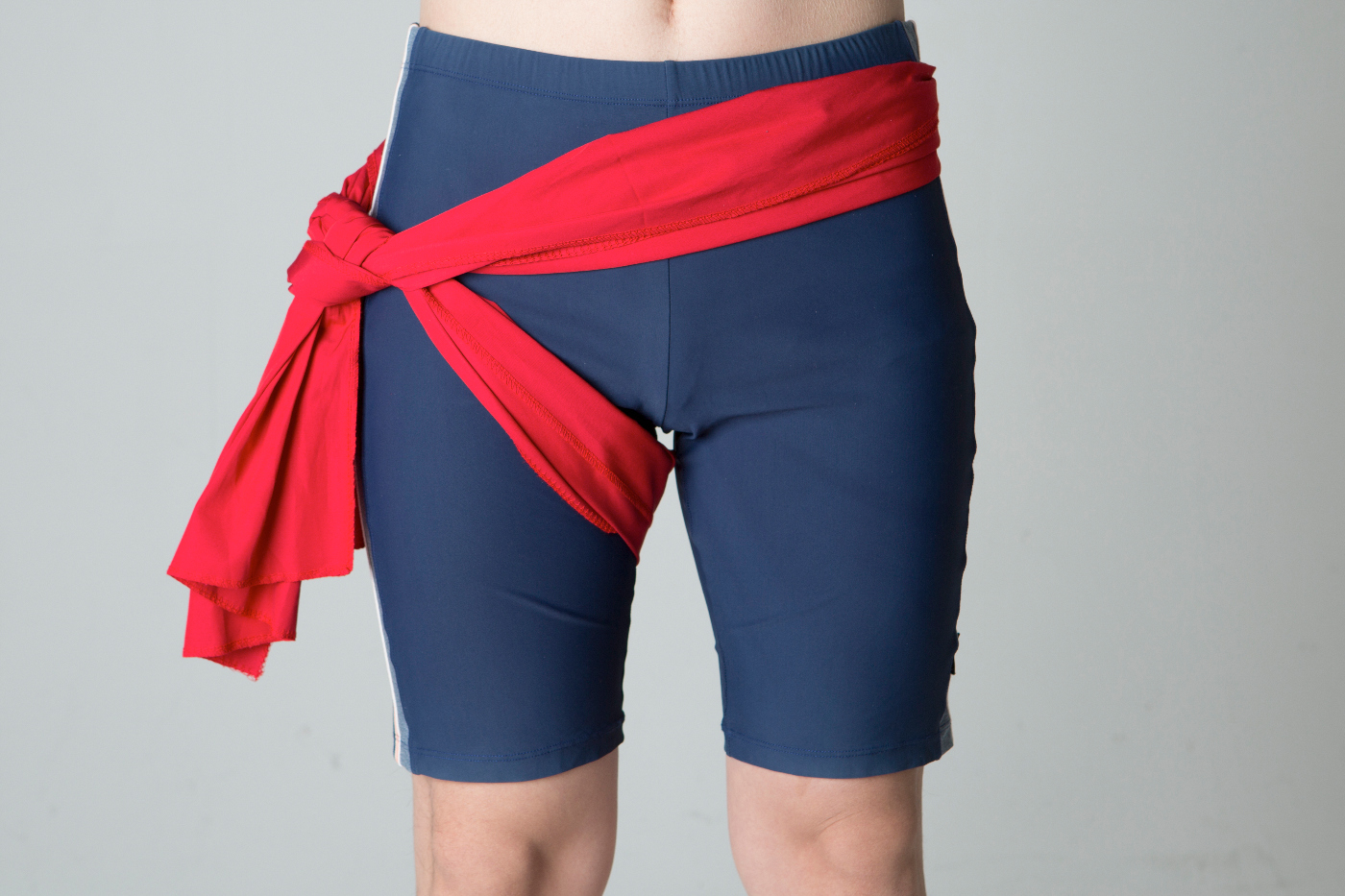
Satba (front)

== See also ==
- Alysh
- Kene (Naga wrestling)
- Mongolian wrestling
- Pahlavani
- Shuai jiao
- Sumo
- Yağlı güreş
