= Korean New Year =

Traditional Korean holiday

Seollal
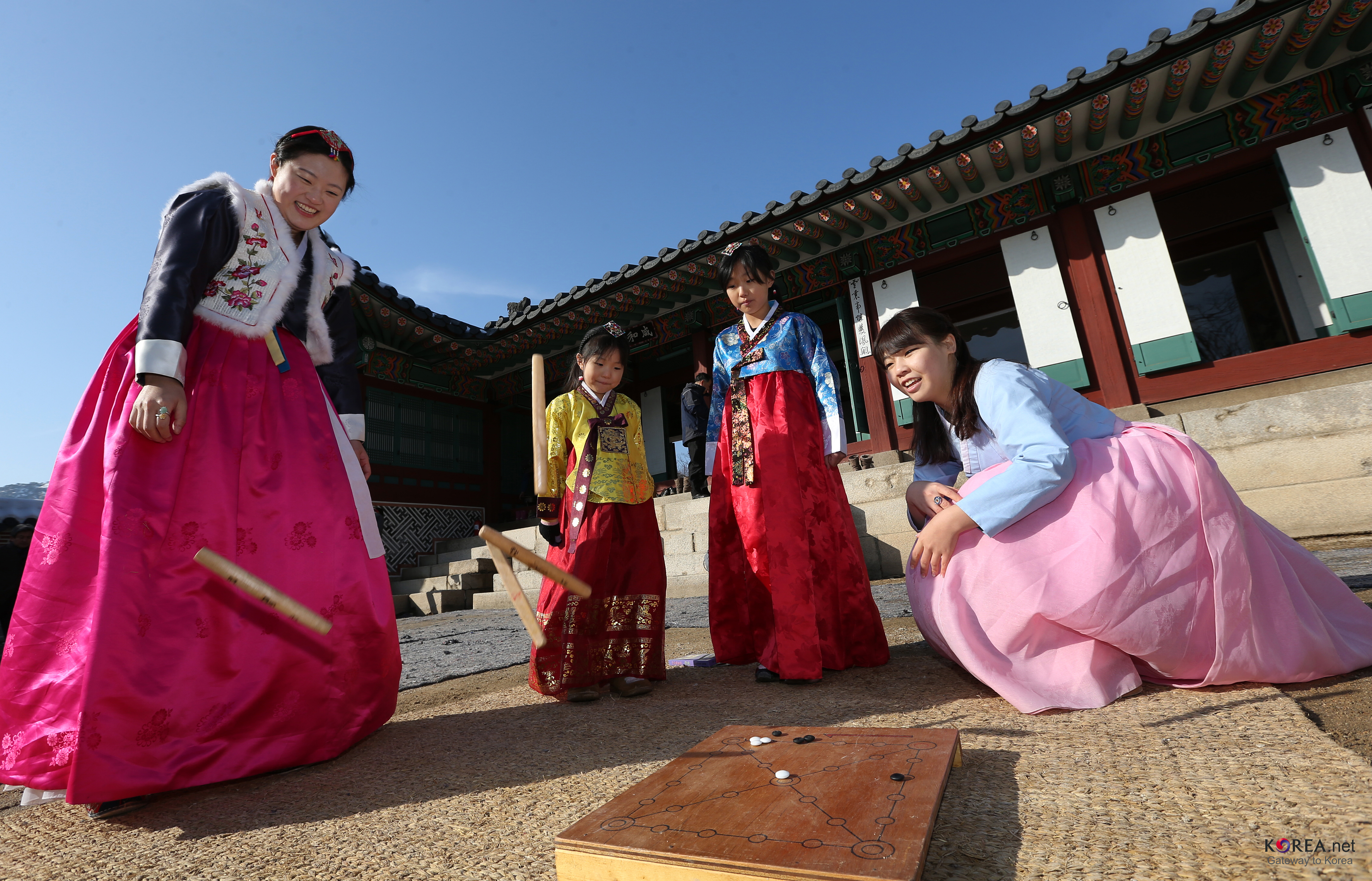
- Koreans wearing hanbok and playing yut during Seollal
- Also called: Seollal, Lunar New Year
- Observed by: Korean people around the world
- Type: Cultural
- Significance: First day of the lunisolar calendar
- Date: Typically the second new moon after the winter solstice
- 2025 date: Wednesday, 29 January
- 2026 date: Tuesday, 17 February
- Frequency: Annual
- Related to: Chinese New Year; Japanese New Year; Mongolian New Year; Tibetan New Year; Taiwanese New Year; Vietnamese New Year

Korean name
- Hangul: 설날
- RR: Seollal
- MR: Sŏllal

Seollal (Korean: 설날) is a Korean traditional festival and national holiday commemorating the first day of the Korean lunisolar calendar. It is one of the most important traditional holidays for ethnic Koreans, being celebrated in both North Korea and South Korea as well as Korean diaspora all around the world.

Seol, written as "설" in Middle Korean in Hangul, means "year of age" since it is also the date when Koreans grow a year older, though in South Korea this has changed as of 2023. The modern Korean word for "age" – sal is derived from the same origin as seol. Nal (날) means day in Korean, derived from Old Korean *NAl. The Hanja term won-il (元日) is used, when referring to the date of the lunar new year of the Korean calendar itself. The Korean lunisolar calendar, like most other East Asian calendars such as those of Japan, Mongolia, Vietnam, among others, are all derived from historical variants of Chinese ones such as the Shixian calendar of the Ming dynasty. China and Japan use different terms for their respective new years, such as 正月 or 元日, which are derived from Classical Chinese.

During this time, many Koreans would visit their family, perform ancestral rites, wear the hanbok (한복; 韓服) / Chosŏn-ot (조선옷; 朝鮮옷), eat traditional food and play traditional folk games. One of the most well known practices in the current day is receiving money from their elders after performing a formal bow, a tradition likely adopted from Confucian customs.

Seollal generally occurs in January or February on the second new moon after the winter solstice, unless there is an intercalary eleventh or twelfth month in the lead-up to the New Year. In such a case, the New Year falls on the third new moon after the solstice.

== Names ==
'Seollal' generally refers to Eumnyeok Seollal (Korean: 음력 설날; Hanja: 陰曆설날; lit. ''lunar new year'', also known as 'Gujeong' (Korean: 구정; Hanja: 舊正)). 'Seollal' may also refer to Yangnyeok Seollal (Korean: 양력 설날; Hanja: 陽曆설날; lit. ''solar new year' i.e. Gregorian new year on 1 January'), also known as Sinjeong (신정; 新正).

While Korean New Year is generally referred to as Seollal, it has been called by many other names. They are listed in the table below.

Literal translation	Hangul	Hanja	RR	MR
The first day	원일	元日	Wonil	Wŏnil
The first morning	원단	元旦	Wondan	Wŏndan
The first morning	원조	元朝	Wonjo	Wŏnjo
The first month	원정	元正	Wonjeong	Wŏnjŏng
The first new	원신	元新	Wonsin	Wŏnshin
The morning of the first month	정조	正朝	Jeongjo	Chŏngjo
The head of the year	세수	歲首	Sesu	Sesu
The head of the year	연두	年頭	Yeondu	Yŏndu
The head of the year	연수	年首	Yeonsu	Yŏnsu
The beginning of the year	세초	歲初	Secho	Sech'o
The beginning of the year	연시	年始	Yeonsi	Yŏnshi

== History ==
=== Adaptation to the Chinese calendar ===
The earliest attestations of the festivals and customs surrounding Seollal are found in the Dongyi section of Volume 30 of the Book of Wei (魏書 東夷傳), of the contemporary Chinese historical work called the Records of the Three Kingdoms (三國志). Worshipping events with the celebration of singing and dancing was recorded in Buyeo during what was the 12th month (殷正月) of the lunisolar calendar at that time.

The earliest records of Seollal celebrations are included in the 7th century Chinese historical works, called the Book of Sui (隋書) and the Old Book of Tang (舊唐書), containing excerpts of national rituals and festivals in Silla in the 7th century. Discontinued practices for worshipping deities from the native folk religion such as the ones of the sun and moon are also mentioned.

The oldest surviving Korean records of Seollal can be found in the Samguk yusa (三國遺事), compiled in the 13th century. During the rule of Bicheo (also called Soji), 21st ruler of Silla, in 488 AD a number of unfortunate events surrounding an affair between a high ranking person responsible for shrines (宮主) and a noble, that coincided with a specific lineup of Zodiac signs led to the day also being nicknamed Daldo (怛忉). The customs and ceremonies for Seollal have been passed onto in time and continued to Goryeo, Joseon as well as the modern day. By the 13th century, the Korean new year was one of the nine major national festivals of Goryeo, according to the Goryeosa.

=== Japanese ban and re-establishment ===
During last vestige of Korean Empire reign in 1907, celebrating Seollal was banned. Korea's last de jure emperor, Sunjong, under intense pressure by the Japanese, had no choice to enact the ban despite reluctance by himself and the Korean people. The Japanese rulers had forced the Koreans to do what they say as part of cultural assimilation and genocide.

In 1910, Korea was officially annexed by the Empire of Japan after years of war, intimidation and political machinations. During this period, the Japanese reiterated the prohibition of celebrating Seollal. The Japanese rulers set the official Korean New Year to follow the Japanese New Year which was set at the first day of the Gregorian calendar since the Meiji Restoration. The day is called 신정; 新正; sinjeong, and the old new year became 구정; 舊正; gujeong.

After the liberation of Korea in 1945 and prior to the Korean War in 1950, the provisional Korean government designated the period from 1 to 3 January of the Gregorian calendar as a public new year holiday. In 1980s South Korea, there was widespread opinion among South Koreans that Seollal should be re-designated as a national holiday. Factors include respecting cultural traditions was raised, in addition to removing remnants of Japanese colonial rule and the South Korean dictatorship period especially under Syngman Rhee and Park Chung Hee.

In response, the South Korean government declared that Seollal was a folk day from 1985 to 1988. In 1989, the Roh Tae-woo administration accepted public opinion that the old New Year's Day should be re-vitalized, designating the original New Year Seollal as both the official Korean New Year and a national holiday.

== Customs ==
The festival is a typical family holiday for the Koreans. The three-day holiday is used by many to return to their hometowns to visit their parents and other relatives, where they perform an ancestral ritual called charye. The three days are the day of, the day before, and the day after. In 2016, 36 million South Koreans reportedly would be traveling to visit their families during the Korean New Year. Koreans not only travel within the country, but around the world, as well. Many Koreans travel from overseas to visit their families for this annual holiday. Since it is one of the few times families may be able to get together and catch up on one another's lives, it is considered respectful and important to attend the holiday. Often, the family members first visit the elders, and this includes the grandparents and the parents. It is also considered respectful for people to visit their mothers- and fathers-in-law during the Korean New Year.

Including travel expense, preparation for this holiday is very costly. Gifts are usually given to family members and new clothes are worn during the holiday. Traditional food is prepared for many family members coming to visit for the holiday. Fruits are especially expensive. Due to the increased demand, food prices are inflated during the month of Seollal. As a result, some people have chosen to forgo some traditions because they have become too expensive. These families prepare a modest ancestral rite only with necessary foods for Seollal. The government has started taking certain measures to help stabilize and support ordinary people's livelihood for the New Year holiday period, raising the supply of agricultural, fishery, and livestock products. The government has also used rice reserves and pork imports to lower inflation. The government is also putting money into small and medium-sized companies to help with cash flow.

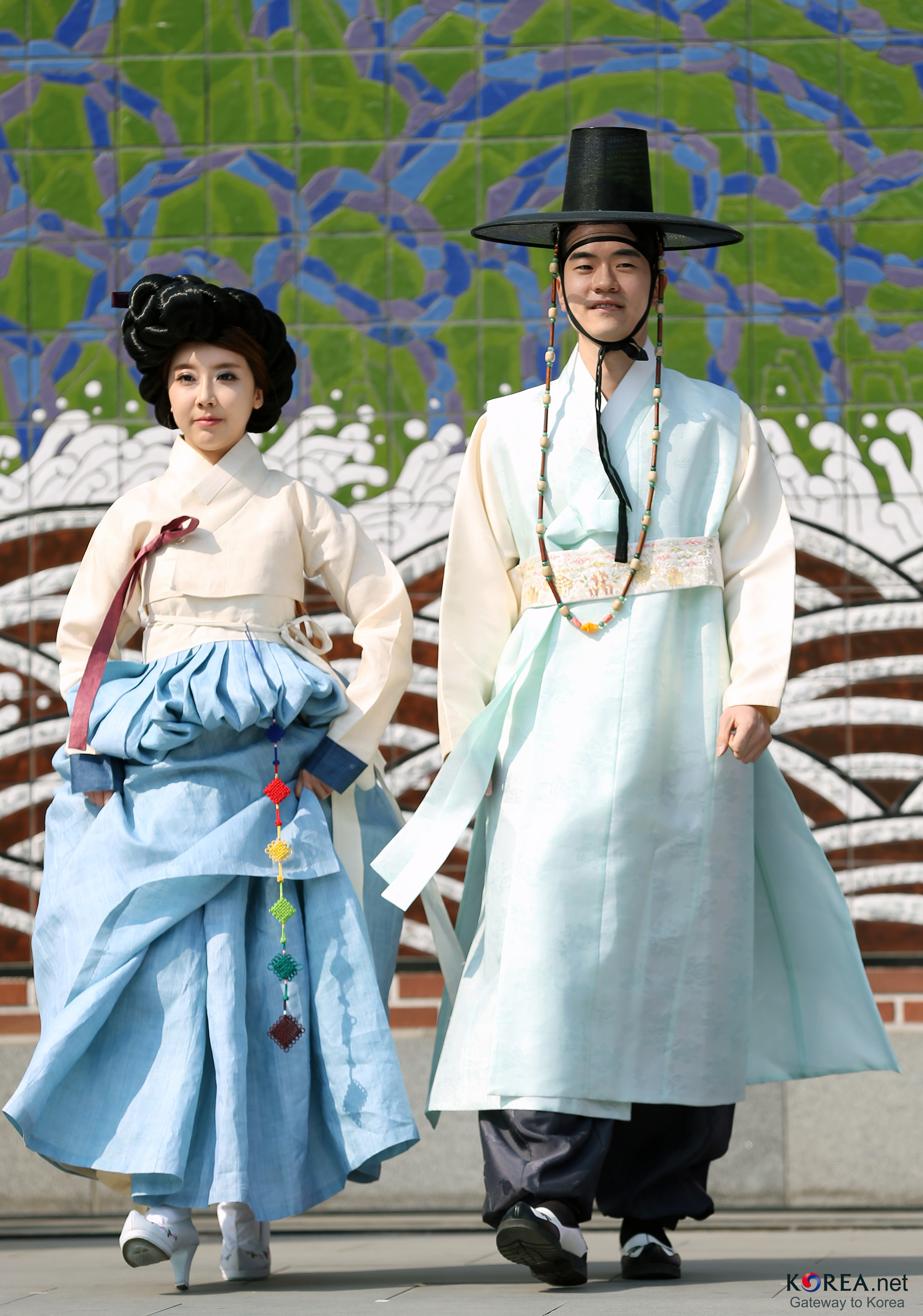
Hanbok

Many preparations go into celebrating the Korean New Year. During the first morning, Koreans pay their respect towards their ancestors. Traditional foods are placed on a table as an offering to the ancestors, and a rite begins with deep bows from all family members. This is a sign of respect and a very important practice on the first day of the New Year in Korea. It is also where they pray for the well-being of all the family members. Many Koreans dress up in colourful traditional Korean clothing called hanbok, usually worn for special occasions such as weddings, Korean New Year, child's first birthday, amongst others. However, with modernization and evolving mores in the culture, more people tend to prefer westernized, modern clothing to the hanbok. After the rite, the members have a big feast.

Additionally, Koreans follow a zodiac that is identical to the Chinese zodiac. 12 animals represent the 12 years in sequential order with the rat/mouse representing the first year. Buddha is believed to have invited animals from all over the world to visit, to which only 12 visited. In return, he honoured them by naming the years in the order that they arrived. Koreans believe that specific zodiac animals bring specific resources and qualities. For example, the year 2014 was the year of the horse, and it was considered a good year in the money and career aspect of life. It is said that a person born in a specific zodiacal year will carry that zodiac animal's characteristics. As a result, Koreans plan their year and activities around it to have a good, prosperous year. Parents may have even planned the birth year of their child, so the child may have a specific characteristic.

Another custom observed is the lighting of a "moon house" built from burnable firewood and branches. This symbolizes the warding off of bad/evil spirits for the new year. Many also choose to add wishes they want to come true in the next year to the moon house.

== Sebae ==
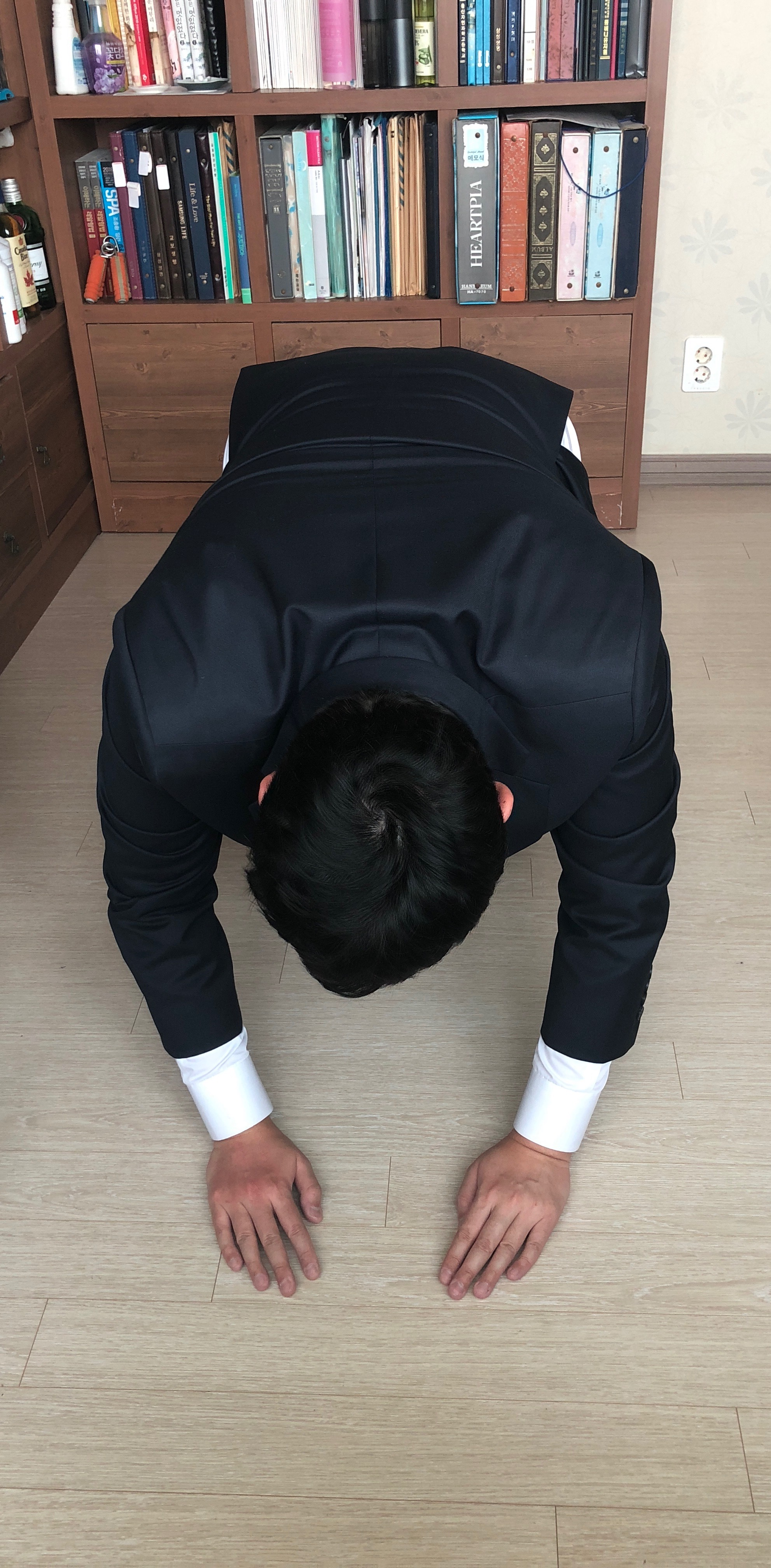
Korean traditional bow

Sebae (Korean: 세배; Hanja: 歲拜; lit. ''worship elders'') is a ritual of filial piety that is traditionally observed on Seollal. Dressed in traditional clothing, people wish their elders (grandparents, parents and aunts and uncles) a happy new year by performing a deep traditional bow (rites with more than one bow involved are usually for the deceased) and saying the words 'saehae bok mani badeuseyo' (새해 복 많이 받으세요, 'Please receive a lot of good fortune for the New Year.') Elders typically reward this gesture by giving children new year's money, or "pocket money" called Sebaet Don (usually in the form of crisp paper money) in silk bags made with beautiful traditional designs, as well as offering words of wisdom (dŏkdam). Historically, parents gave out rice cakes (ddeok) and fruit to their children.

== New Year food ==
=== Tteokguk ===
The main dish eaten on New Year's Day in South Korea is tteokguk (떡국; IPA: [t͈ʌk̚.k͈uk̚]), a traditional soup consisting of rice cakes (tteok) most commonly served in a beef based broth and typically garnished with thinly sliced egg, green onion, and meat. There are many other variations featuring soy sauce in the soup base, as well as the addition of Korean dumplings known as mandu (만두). The tteok is made by steaming glutinous rice flour and shaping the dough into long ropes that signify "an expansion of good fortune in the new year." The rice cake ropes are then sliced into thin, oval shapes thought to resemble yeopjeon (엽전), a traditional Korean currency. The white color of the rice cakes is also thought to represent "purity and cleanliness." Korean people believe that eating tteokguk signifies adding another year to your life as well. Its origins can be traced back to the 19th century from the mention of tteokguk in the "Dongguk Sesigi", a book on traditional Korean customs. The dish was said to be "prepared during ancestral rites on the first morning of Lunar New Year." Tteokguk carries heavy symbolic meaning as a Seollal dish representing good fortune, new beginnings, and the rich holiday traditions of Korea.

=== Jeon ===
Savory pancakes called jeon (전; IPA: /tɕʌn/) are typically included in the Korean New Year's feast. Made with various fillings such as meat, seafood, and vegetables, the side dishes are a fried, flour-based side dish. Out of the many variations, shredded beef (yukjeon; 육전), oysters (guljeon; 굴전), kimchi (kimchijeon; 김치전), and green onion (pajeon; 파전) are the most popular fillings for the crispy pancakes. The jeon is often accompanied with a spicy, soy sauce and vinegar mixture flavored with Korean chili powder called gochugaru to enhance its taste. Traditionally, jeon is prepared for holidays and festive occasions like Lunar New Years, though they are presently regarded as a staple Korean side dish or appetizer in everyday meals.

=== Japchae ===
In addition to being served at birthday parties and weddings, japchae (잡채; IPA: /t͡ɕa̠p̚t͡ɕʰɛ/) is often served on holidays like Seollal as well. Japchae is a noodle dish containing beef, vegetables such as spinach, carrots, mushrooms, and chili peppers, and clear cellophane noodles made from potato starch. The mixture is stir fried and tossed in a sauce made from soy sauce, sugar, and sesame oil. Originally, japchae did not contain any noodles or meat at all when it was invented by a servant of King Gwangaegun, though it has evolved since then to become Korea's well known noodle dish suitable for celebrations.

== Folk games ==
Many traditional games are associated with the Korean New Year. The traditional family board game yutnori remains a popular game, especially during Korean New Year. It is played using a set of specially designed sticks and is considered appropriate for all ages and genders. Men and boys traditionally would also fly rectangle kites called Yeon (연, see yeonnalligi), and also play jegichagi, a game in which a light object is wrapped in paper or cloth, and then kicked in a footbag-like manner. Korean women and girls would have traditionally played neolttwigi, a game of jumping on a seesaw (시소), and gongginori, a game played with five little gonggi (originally a little stone, but today many buy manufactured gongi in toy shops). Top (paengi (팽이) spinning is also a traditional game played by children. Recently, a few adults play Go-Stop instead of traditional hwatu.

== See also ==
- Korean Calendar
- Public holidays in South Korea
- Public holidays in North Korea
- Celebrations of Lunar New Year in other parts of Asia:
  - Chinese New Year (Spring Festival)
  - Japanese New Year (Shōgatsu)
  - Mongolian New Year (Tsagaan Sar)
  - Taiwanese New Year (Kuè-nî)
  - Tibetan New Year (Losar)
  - Vietnamese New Year (Tết Nguyên Đán)
- Similar Asian Lunisolar New Year celebrations that occur in April:
  - Burmese New Year (Thingyan)
  - Cambodian New Year (Chaul Chnam Thmey)
  - Lao New Year (Pii Mai)
  - Sri Lankan New Year (Aluth Avuruddu)
  - Thai New Year (Songkran)
