= Chuseok =

Korean autumn holiday

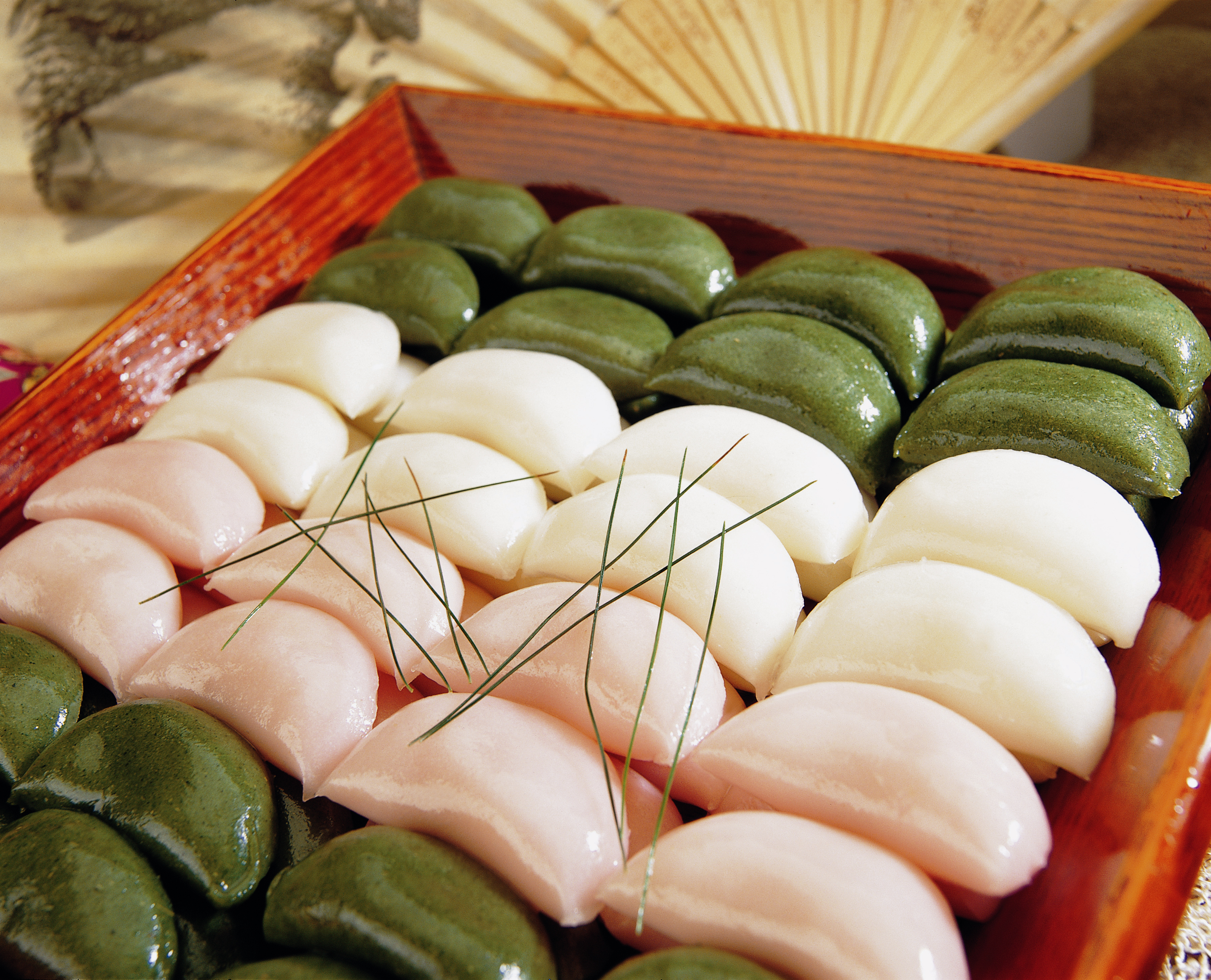
- Songpyeon, a type of tteok to celebrate Chuseok.
- Official name: Chuseok (추석; 秋夕)
- Also called: Hangawi, Jungchujeol
- Observed by: Koreans
- Type: Cultural, religious (Buddhist, Confucian, Muist)
- Significance: Celebrates the harvest
- Observances: Visit to their family's home town, ancestor worship, harvest feasts with songpyeon and rice wines
- Begins: 14th day of the 8th lunar month
- Ends: 16th day of the 8th lunar month
- Date: 15th day of the 8th lunar month
- 2025 date: 5 October – 7 October
- 2026 date: 24 September – 26 September
- 2027 date: 14 September – 16 September
- 2028 date: 2 October – 4 October
- Frequency: Annual
- Related to: Mid-Autumn Festival (in China); Tsukimi (in Japan); Tết Trung Thu (in Vietnam); Uposatha of Ashvini/Krittika (similar festivals that generally occur on the same day in Cambodia, India, Sri Lanka, Myanmar, Laos, and Thailand)

Korean name
- Hangul: 추석
- Hanja: 秋夕
- RR: Chuseok
- MR: Ch'usŏk
- IPA: [tɕʰusʌk̚]

Alternate name
- Hangul: 한가위
- RR: Hangawi
- MR: Han'gawi
- IPA: [hɐnɡɐɥi]

Chuseok (Korean: 추석; [tɕʰu.sʌk̚], lit. 'autumn evening'), also known as Hangawi (한가위; [han.ɡa.ɥi]; from Old Korean, "the great middle [of autumn]"), is a major Korean mid-autumn harvest festival which occurs on the 15th day of the 8th month of the lunisolar calendar, on the full moon. In South Korea, the festival lasts for three days, including the days before and after the full moon. In North Korea, Chuseok is a single-day celebration on the full moon only.

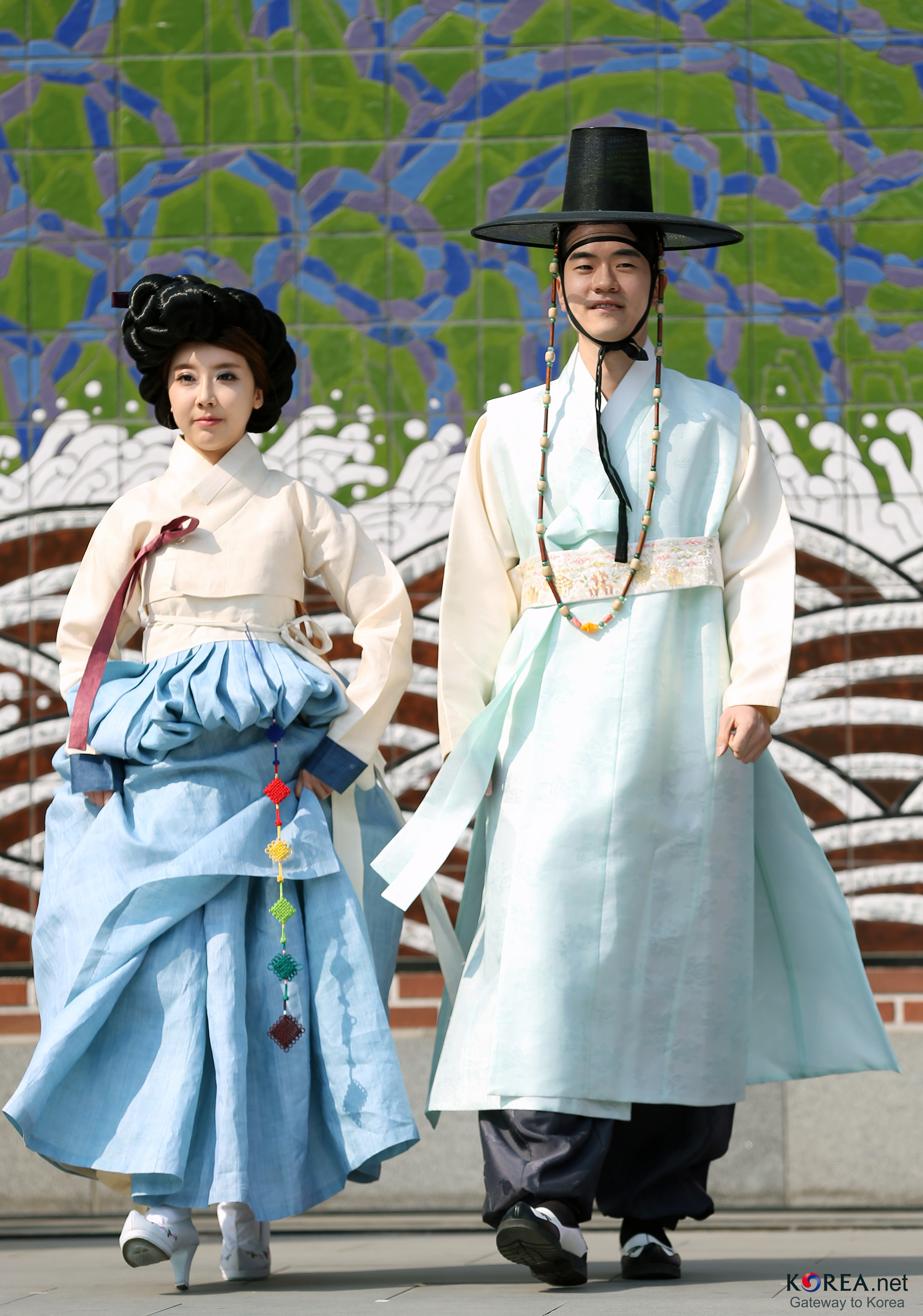
Hanbok

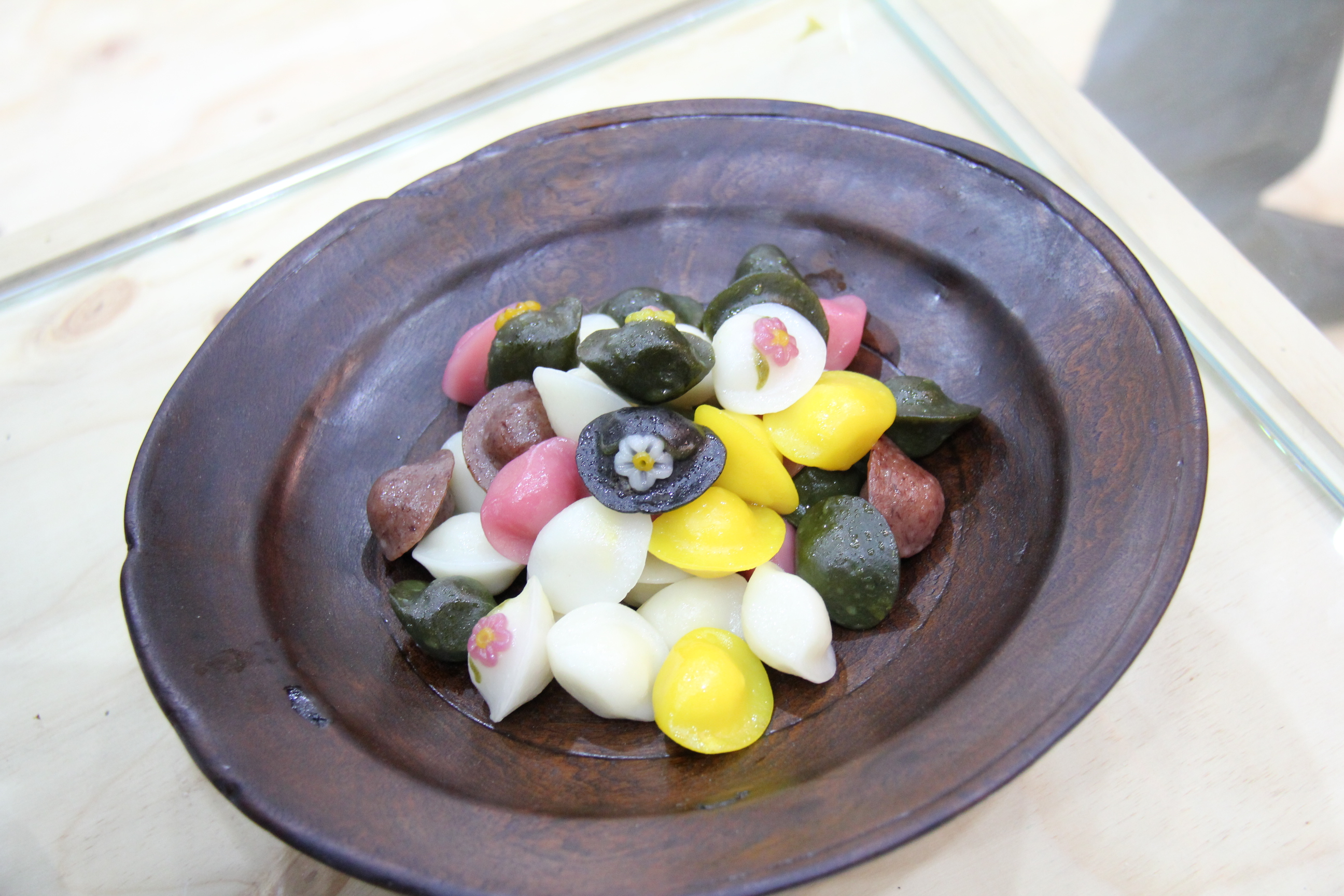
Songpyeon

As a celebration of the good harvest, Koreans visit their ancestral hometowns and share a feast of Korean traditional food such as songpyeon, yakgwa, fruits like Asian pear and hallabong, and rice wines such as sindoju (신도주; 新稻酒) and dongdongju. There are two major traditions related to Chuseok: Charye (차례; 茶禮, ancestor memorial services at home, also known as Jesa), and Seongmyo (성묘; 省墓, family visit to the ancestral graves). The latter is usually accompanied by Beolcho (벌초; 伐草, tidying graves, removing weeds around them). Another major custom is to prepare the family's ancestors their favorite meals as an offering.

== Origins ==
According to popular belief, Chuseok originates from gabae (가배; 嘉俳; 嘉排). Gabae started during the reign of the third king of the kingdom of Silla (57 BC – AD 935), when it was a month-long weaving contest between two teams. On the day of Gabae, the team that had woven more cloth won and would be treated to a feast by the losing team. It is believed that weaving competitions, archery competitions, and martial arts demonstrations were held as part of the festivities.

Many scholars also believe Chuseok may originate from ancient shamanistic celebrations of the harvest moon. New harvests are offered to local deities and ancestors, which means Chuseok may have originated as a worship ritual. In some areas, if there is no harvest, worship rituals are postponed, or in areas with no annual harvest, Chuseok is not celebrated.

== Traditional customs ==
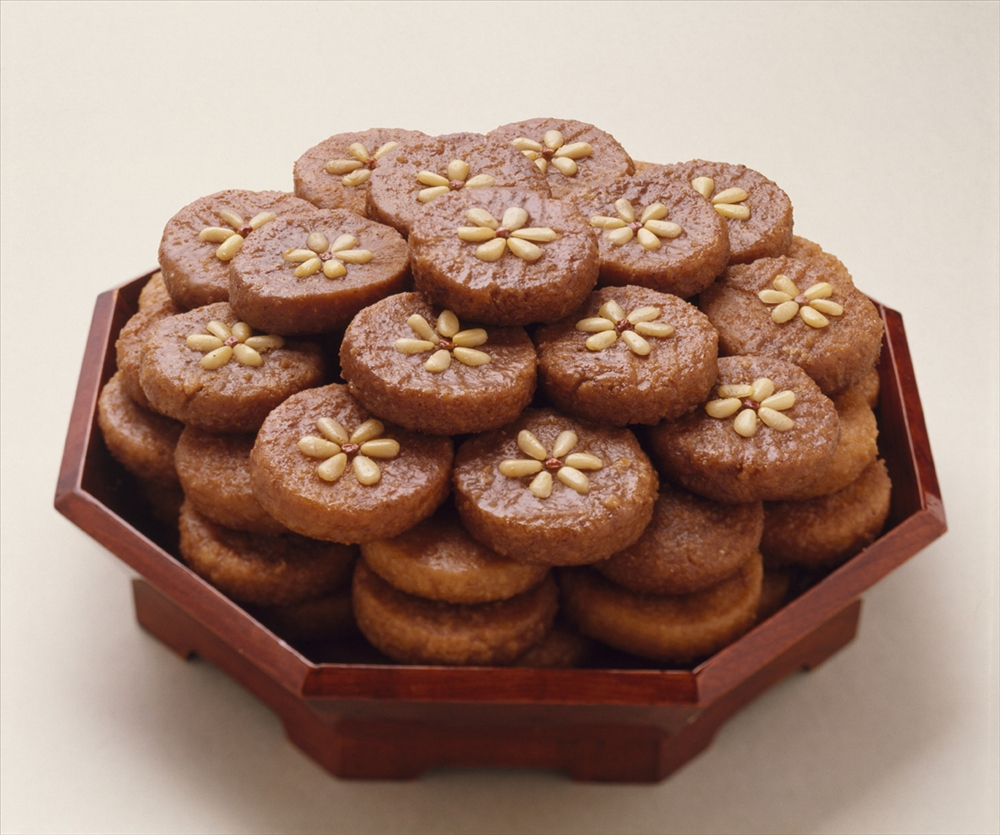
Yakgwa

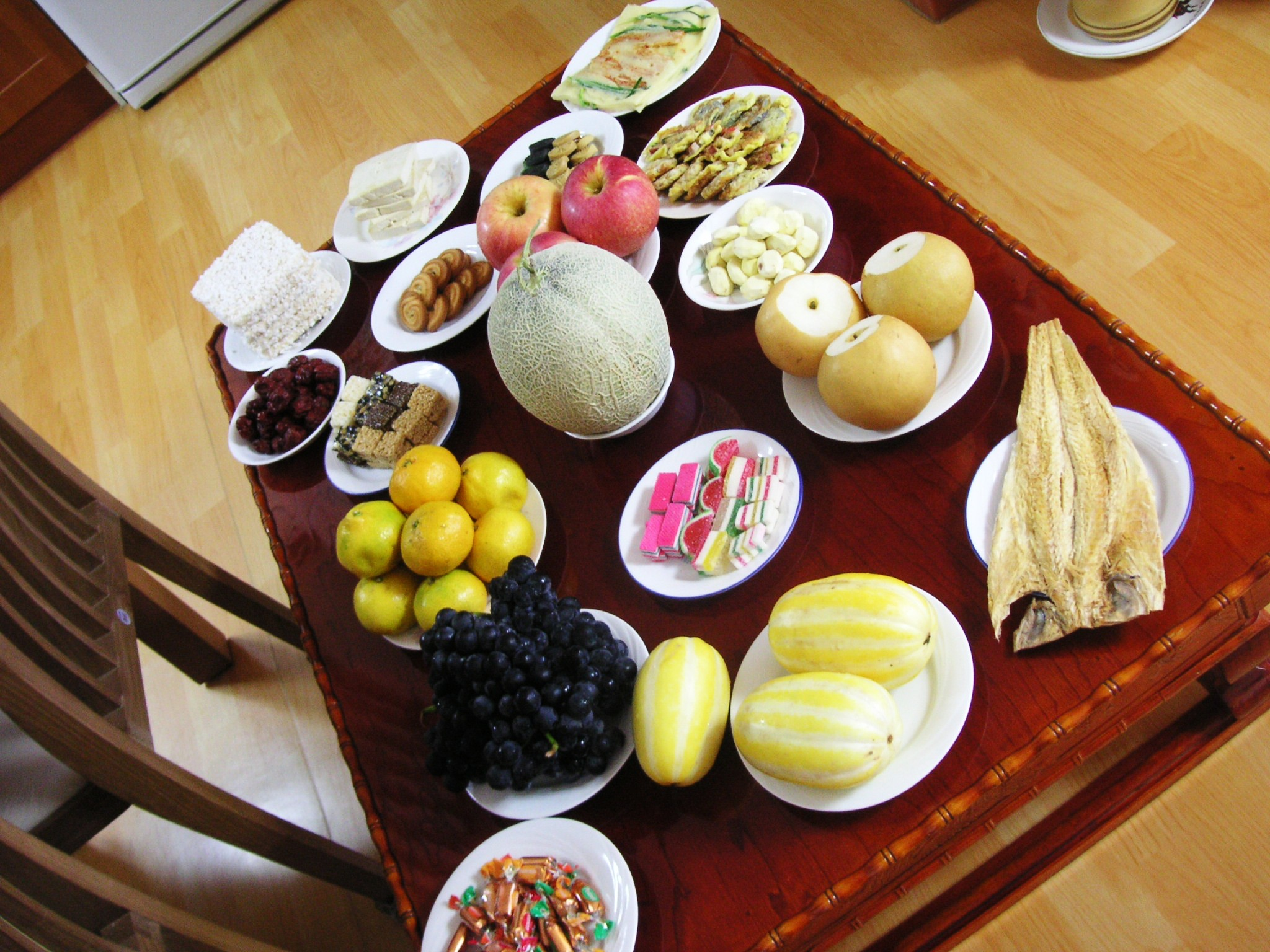
A table with many traditional food offerings on it

In contemporary South Korea, on Chuseok, masses of people travel from large cities to their hometowns to pay respect to the spirits of their ancestors. Chuseok celebrates the bountiful harvest and strives for the next year to be better than the last. People perform ancestral worship rituals early in the morning. Then, they visit the tombs of their immediate ancestors to trim plants, clean the area around the tomb, and offer food, drink, and crops to their ancestors. The rest of the day is spent playing folk games and bonding with the family members. Harvest crops are attributed to the blessing of ancestors. Chuseok is commonly translated as "Korean Thanksgiving" in American English despite the holidays being vastly different in origin and celebration. Although most South Koreans visit their families and ancestral homes, there are festivities held at the National Folk Museum of Korea. Many places are closed during this national holiday, including banks, schools, post offices, governmental departments, and stores. Airline tickets to South Korea around the festival are usually sold out three months in advance and roads and hotels are overcrowded.

=== Charye ===
Charye is one of the ancestral memorial rites celebrated during Chuseok, symbolizing the abundance of the harvest season and honoring ancestors and past generations. The rite involves the gathering of families in holding a memorial service for their ancestors through the harvesting, preparation and presentation of special foods as offerings. Preparation for the food usually takes hours and many families start the cooking process early in the morning. The rite embodies the traditional view of spiritual life beyond physical death, respecting the spirits of the afterlife that now also serve to protect their descendants. The foods offered vary across provinces depending on what is available, but commonly feature freshly harvested rice, rice cakes (songpyeon) and fresh meat, fruit and vegetables. The arrangement of the foods of Charye on the table is also notable: traditionally rice and soup are placed on the north and fruits and vegetables are placed on the south; meat dishes are served on the west and in the middle, and rice cake and some drinks such as makgeolli or soju are placed on the east. These details can vary across regions.

=== Hanbok ===
The hanbok (in South Korea) or Choson-ot (in North Korea) is the traditional dress that the Korean people wear on special holidays and formal and semi-formal occasions, such as Chuseok, Lunar New Year, and weddings. The term "hanbok" literally means "Korean clothing." The basic structure of the hanbok consists of the jeogori jacket, baji pants, chima skirt, and the po coat. The design of the hanbok remains unchanged to this day and is designed in a variety of colors.

=== Food ===
==== Songpyeon ====
One of the major foods prepared and eaten during the Chuseok holiday is songpyeon (송편; 松餠), a Korean traditional rice cake made with ingredients such as sesame seeds, black beans, mung beans, cinnamon, pine nut, walnut, chestnut, jujube, and honey. When making songpyeon, steaming them over a layer of pine-needles is critical. The word song in songpyeon means a pine tree in Korean. The pine needles not only contribute to songpyeon's aromatic fragrance, but also its beauty and taste.

Songpyeon is also significant because of the meaning contained in its shape. However, some songpyeon are shaped like a ball. Songpyeon's rice skin itself resembles the shape of a full moon, but once it wraps the stuffing, its shape resembles the half-moon. Since the Three Kingdoms era in Korean history, a Korean legend stated that these two shapes ruled the destinies of the two greatest rival kingdoms, Baekje and Silla. During the era of King Uija of Baekje, an encrypted phrase, "Baekje is full-moon and Silla is half-moon" was found on a turtle's back and it predicted the fall of the Baekje and the rise of the Silla. The prophecy came true when Silla defeated Baekje. Ever since Koreans have believed a half-moon shape is an indicator of a bright future or victory. Therefore, during Chuseok, families gather together and eat half-moon-shaped Songpyeon under the full moon, wishing for a brighter future. There's a belief that if a single woman makes a pretty songpyeon, she will find a great husband, and if a pregnant woman makes a pretty songpyeon, she will have a pretty daughter.

==== Hangwa ====
Another popular Korean traditional food that people eat during Chuseok is hangwa. It is a general term to categorize sweet foods made with tteok, meaning rice cake. It is an artistic food decorated with natural colors and textured with patterns. Hangwa, also known as Hang, is made with rice flour, honey, fruit, and roots. People use edible natural ingredients to express various colors, flavours, and tastes. Because of its decoration and nutrition, Koreans eat hang not only during Chuseok, but also for special events, for instance, weddings, birthday parties, and marriages.

The most famous types of hangwa are yakgwa, yugwa, and dasik. Yakgwa is a sweet honey cookie which is made of fried rice flour dough ball and yugwa is a fried cookie consisting of glutinous rice mixed with honey water, and cheongju (rice wine). Dasik is a tea cake that people enjoy with tea.

==== Baekju ====
A major element of Chuseok is alcoholic drinks. Liquor drunk on Chuseok is called baekju (백주, 白酒, literally "white wine") and nicknamed sindoju (신도주, 新稻酒, literally "new rice liquor") as it is made of freshly harvested rice.

Kooksoondang, a maker of Korean traditional liquors, restored "Yihwaju", rice wine from the Goryeo era (918–1392), and "Songjeolju" that has been widely enjoyed by Joseon (1392–1910) aristocrats. Its "Jamyang Baekseju" package comprises a variety of liquors ― Jayang Baekseju, Jang Baekseju, Baekokju ― that are claimed to enhance men's stamina.

==== Others ====
Other foods commonly prepared are japchae, bulgogi, an assortment of Korean pancakes also known as jeon, saengseon (fish), and fruits.

=== Gifts ===
==== History of Chuseok gifts ====
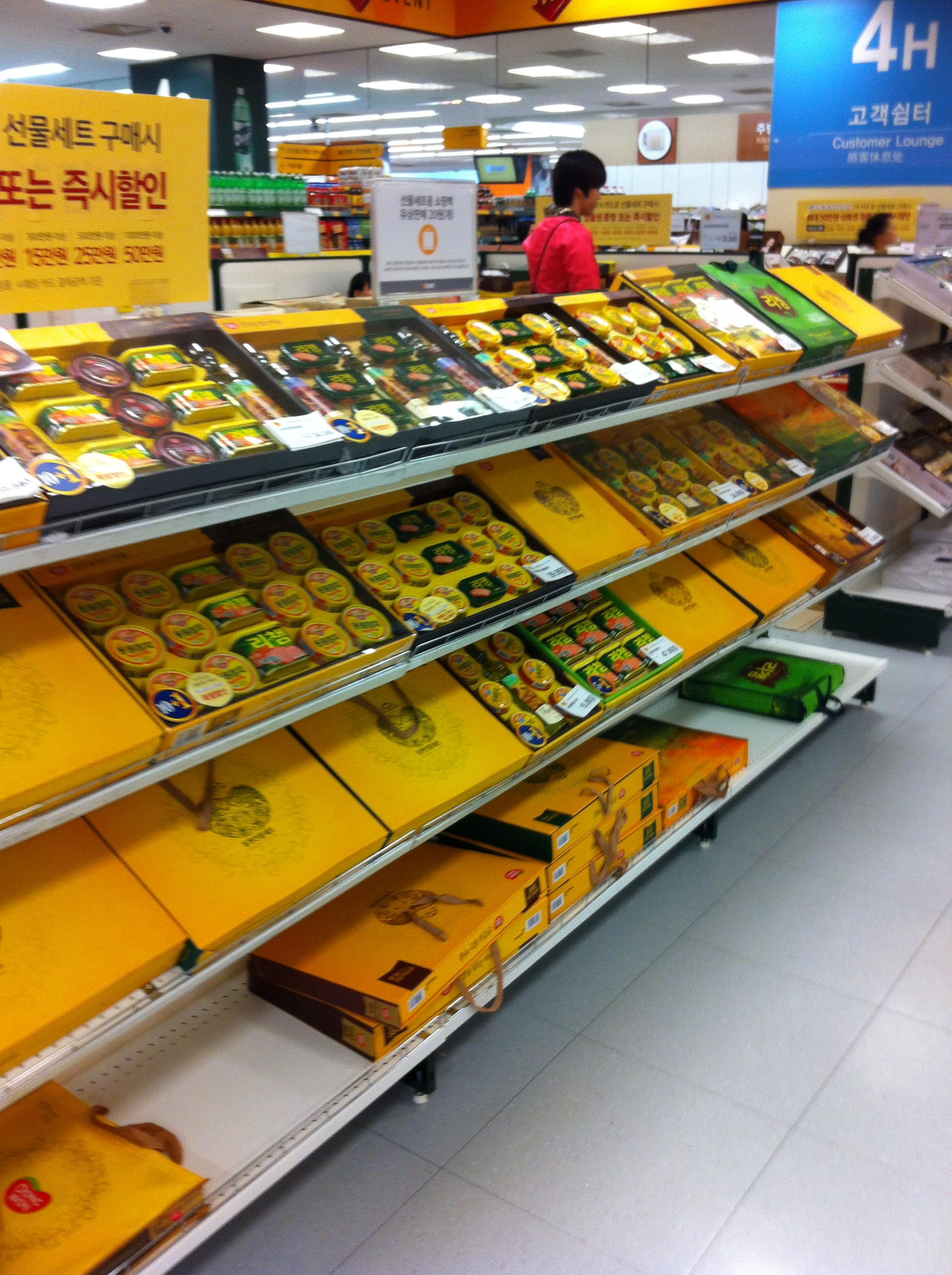
Chuseok Gifts

The Korean people started sharing daily necessities, such as sugar, soap or condiments, as Chuseok gifts in the 1960s. The gifts have changed since the Korean economy has developed. In the 1970s, Korean people had more options for Chuseok gifts; examples include cooking oil, toothpaste, instant coffee sets, cosmetics, television and rice cookers. People chose gift sets of fruit, meat and cosmetics in the 1980s. In the 1990s, people used gift vouchers for Chuseok. In the 21st century, more sophisticated gifts, such as sets of sweet desserts, spam, fruits, health supplements, and skincare have become the most popular options for Chuseok gifts.

==== Types of Chuseok gifts and prices ====
Some extravagant gifts can be purchased: one kilogram of wild pine mushrooms, which are expensive because they cannot be artificially grown, cost 560,000 won (US$480.27), and red ginseng products cost 1.98 million won (US$1,698.11). However, the most exorbitantly priced gift is six bottles of wine at Lotte Department Store for 33 million won (US$28,301.89).

Chuseok gift sets are big business in Korea and prices are typically inflated around the holiday.

=== Folk games ===
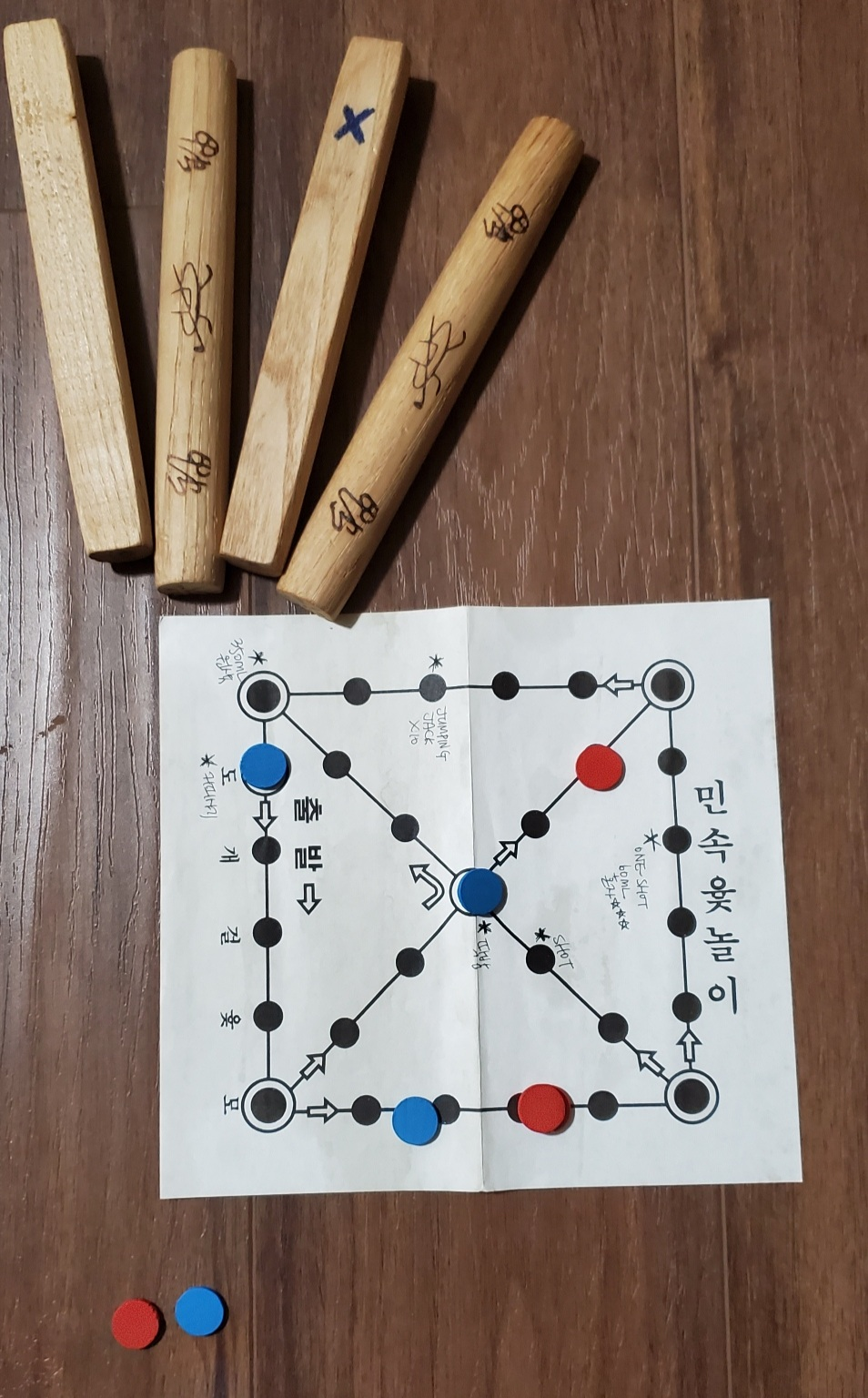
Yut Nori

A variety of folk games are played on Chuseok to celebrate the coming of autumn and rich harvest. Sonori is a folk performance where village folk dress themselves to resemble a cow or turtle and go from house to house along with a nongak band playing pungmul music. Other common folk games played on Chuseok are talchum (mask dance), board game called Yut Nori, (also known as Yunnori, Nyout, and Yout), archery, ssireum, (Korean wrestling), and juldarigi; folk games vary by region.

==== Ssireum ====
Ssireum (씨름) is the most popular Korean sport played during Chuseok and contests are usually held during this holiday. Scholars have found evidence for ssireum dating back to the Goguryeo dynasty. Ssireum is assumed to have 5,000 years of history. Two players wrestle each other while holding onto their opponent's satba, a red and blue band. A player loses when his upper body touches the ground, and the winner becomes Cheonha Jangsa, Baekdu Jangsa, or Halla Jangsa, meaning "the most powerful". The winner gets a bull and 1 kg (2.2 lb) of rice as the prize. Due to its popularity among both the young and the old, ssireum contests are held more frequently, not limited to important holidays.

==== Taekkyon ====
Taekkyon (태껸or 택견) is one of the oldest traditional martial arts of Korea. Taekkyon was very popular during the Joseon period (1392–1897) where it was practised alongside Ssireum during festivities, including Chuseok. Though originally a hand-to-hand fighting method, plebs used a more tamed version alike to a kicking game. The practitioner uses the momentum of his opponent to knock him down through kicks, swipes and pushes. Tournaments between players from different villages were carried out, starting with the children ("Aegi Taekkyon") before finishing with the adults.

Taekkyon almost disappeared during the Japanese occupation (1910–1945) but is now considered a cultural heritage of Korea (1983) and a UNESCO intangible cultural item (2011).

==== Ganggangsullae ====
The Ganggangsullae (강강술래) dance is a traditional folk dance performed under the full moon in the night of Chuseok. Women wear Korean traditional dress, hanbok, make a big circle by holding hands, and sing a song while going around a circle. Its name, Ganggangsullae, came from the refrain repeated after each verse, and contains no actual meaning.

For other folk games, they also play Neolttwigi (also known as the Korean plank), a traditional game played on a wooden board.

==== Juldarigi ====
Juldarigi (줄다리기), or tug-of-war, was enjoyed by an entire village population. Two groups of people are divided into two teams representing the female and male forces of the natural world. The game is considered an agricultural rite to predict the results of the year's farming. If the team representing the female concept won, it was thought the harvest that year would be rich.

==== Chicken Fight (Dak-ssaum) ====
Korean people used to watch chicken fights (닭싸움), and learned how chickens fought; a game inspired by such was invented.

To play the game, people are separated into two balanced groups. One must bend their leg up and hold it bent with the knee poking out. The players must then attack each other with their bent knees, having to eliminate them by making their feet touch the ground; the last player holding up their knee wins.

The game is about strength, speed, and balance; to stay alive, one must display the capability of fighting back.

==== Hwatu ====
Hwatu (화투, also known as Go-Stop or Godori) is composed of 48 cards including 12 kinds. The rules of the game and the term water originated from Tujeon. It was formerly similar to Hanafuda, but was changed due to similarities with the latter. It went through a course that made it reduced by four base colors and thinner than before, spreading throughout to turn out goods on a mass-produced basis.

== In North Korea ==
Since Chuseok is a traditional holiday that has been celebrated long before the division of Korea, people in North Korea also celebrate Chuseok. However, the ideology that divided Korea also caused some differences between the way that the holiday is celebrated in North Korea from the way it is celebrated in South Korea. In fact, North Korea did not celebrate Chuseok and other traditional holidays until the mid-1980s.

While South Koreans celebrate Chuseok by visiting and spending time with family members, most North Koreans do not have any family gatherings for the holiday. Some, especially those in working classes, try to visit their ancestors' gravesites during Chuseok. However, social and economic issues in North Korea have been preventing visits. In addition, the extremely poor infrastructure of North Korea, especially in terms of public transportation, makes it almost impossible for people to visit grave sites and their families. In contrast to the poor Songbun lower class North Koreans, middle and elite classes enjoy the holiday as they want, easily traveling wherever they want to go.

== See also ==
- Hansik, another Korean holiday for ancestral rituals
- List of Buddhist festivals
- List of harvest festivals
- List of festivals in South Korea
- Public holidays in South Korea
- List of Korean traditional festivals

== Sources ==
- The Academy of Korean Studies, ed. (1991), "Chuseok", Encyclopedia of Korean People and Culture, Woongjin (in Korean)
- Farhadian, Charles E. (2007). Christian Worship Worldwide. Wm. Bm. Eerdmans Publishing. ISBN 978-0-8028-2853-8.
- Korea University Institute of Korean Culture, ed. (1982). "Social Life". Korean Heritage Overview. Vol. 1. Korea University.(in Korean)
- Aviles, K. (2011, September 10). Chuseok : A Festival With Two Faces. International Business Times. Retrieved December 4, 2012
- Im, J. J. (2010, September 23). Daily NK - Welcome to Chuseok, North Korean Style. DailyNK. Retrieved December 4, 2012
- Kim, K.-C. (2008). Ganggangsullae. UNESCO Multimedia Archives. Retrieved December 4, 2012
- Korea.net. (2012, February 5). Chuseok, Korean Thanksgiving Day (English) - YouTube. YouTube. Retrieved December 4, 2012
- Moon, S. H. (2008, September 16). Daily NK - New Chuseok Trends in North Korea. DailyNK. Retrieved December 4, 2012
- Official Korea Tourism. (2008, August 26). Chuseok: Full Moon Harvest Holiday, Korean Version of Thanksgiving Day. VisitKorea. Retrieved December 4, 2012
- The National Folklore Museum of Korea. (n.d.). Ancestral Memorial Rites - Charye | The National Folklore Museum of Korea. The National Folklore Museum of Korea. Retrieved December 5, 2012
- TurtlePress (Martial Arts Video). (2009, May 1). SSireum Korean Wrestling History - YouTube. YouTube. Retrieved December 4, 2012
- Yoo, K. H. (2009, October 5). Chuseok, North Korean Style. DailyNK. Retrieved December 4, 2012
