= Seoul Street Art Festival =

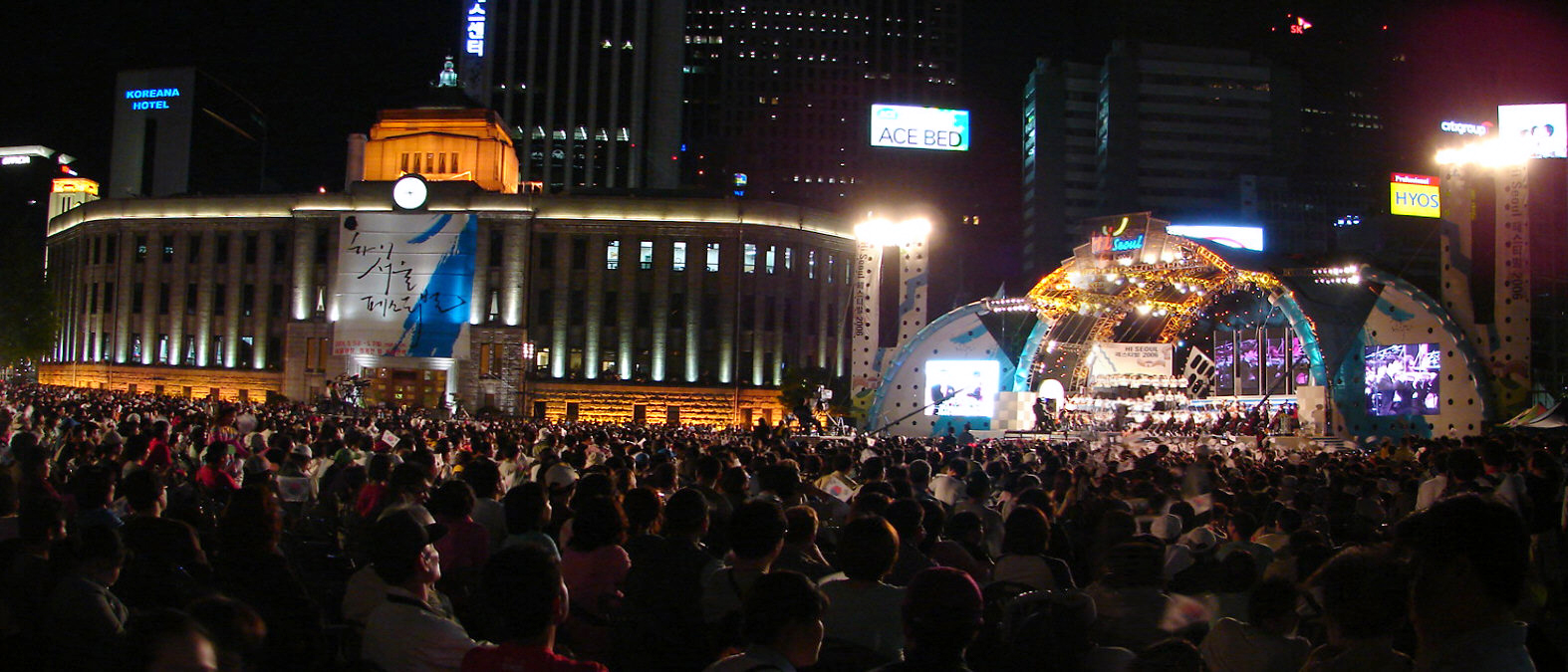
2003 Concert at City Hall Square

The Seoul Street Arts Festival is an annual festival held across Seoul, South Korea, and organized by the Seoul Foundation for Arts & Culture. It is the country’s largest street art festival, with performances from local and international artists. While the festival is free, some performances now require advanced reservation as they have limited seating. There is an official program of select artists, but there are also many off program performances to enjoy as well.

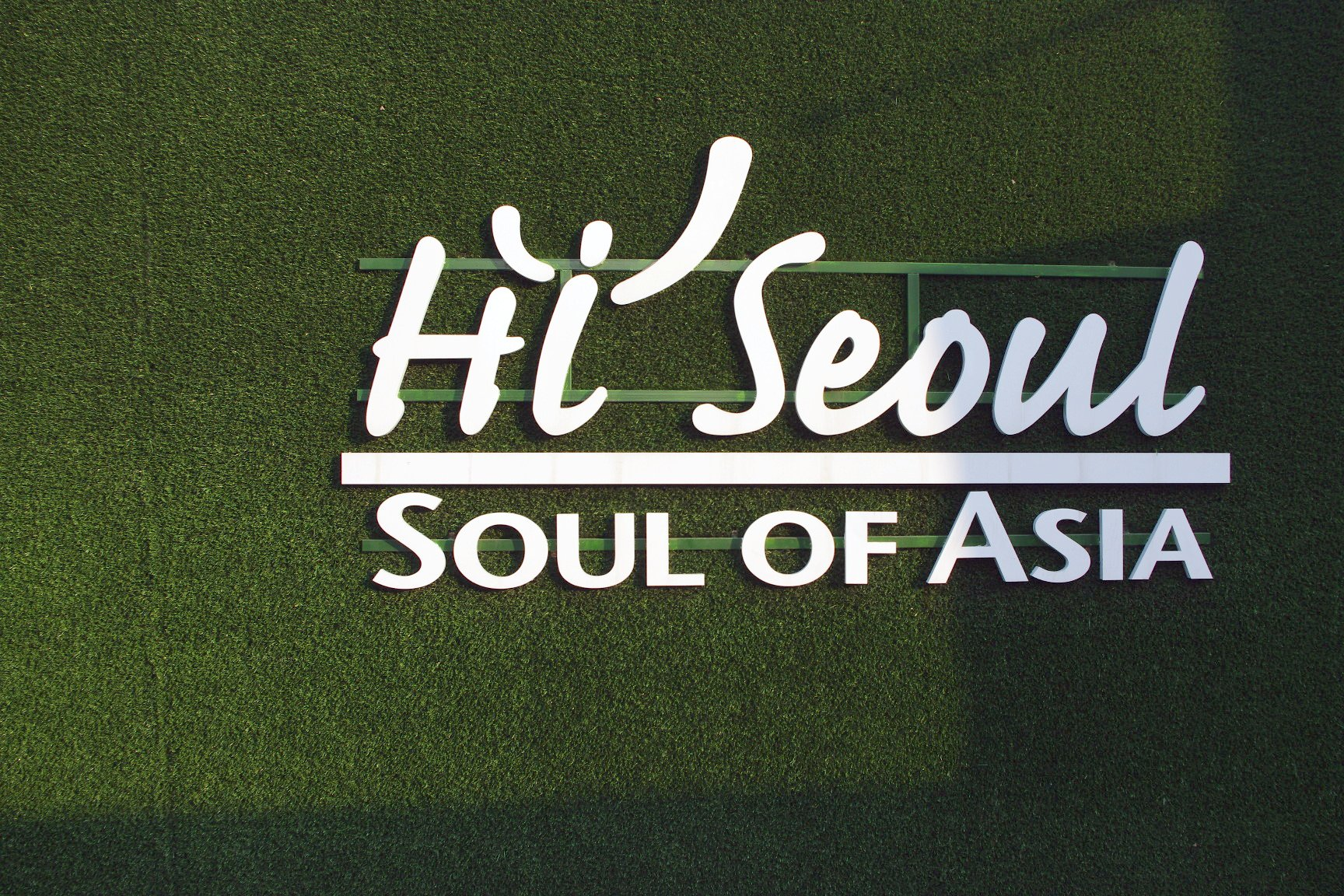

The festival began in 2003 as the Hi! Seoul Festival showcasing a wide array of cultural and art performances. By 2013, the focus was narrowed to street art performances. The name was changed to the Seoul Street Arts Festival in 2016 to reflect this focus. As it has grown, the festival has become the center for contemporary street arts in Asia, giving acts chances for global recognition. The event includes interactive activities to encourage public involvement, rounding out the captivating cultural experience.

The festival takes place across central Seoul at iconic locations such as:

- Seoul Plaza
- Nodeul Island
- Cheonggye Plaza
- Gwanghwamun Square
- Deoksugung Doldam-gil
- Seoul Museum of Art
- Seoul City Hall

In 2024, the festival took place over the Chuseok holiday, with many displays showing tribute to the Year of the Rabbit. There were 77 Official Program performances and with over 300 artists representing eight countries.

The Seoul Street Arts Festival has gained widespread recognition for its contribution to the arts and cultural landscape of South Korea. By fostering artistic exchange and promoting street performances, it has become a significant platform for both local and international artists. Through its continued efforts, the festival supports the growth and appreciation of street arts while enhancing Seoul’s cultural vibrancy.

== Gallery of Hi! Seoul Festival events ==
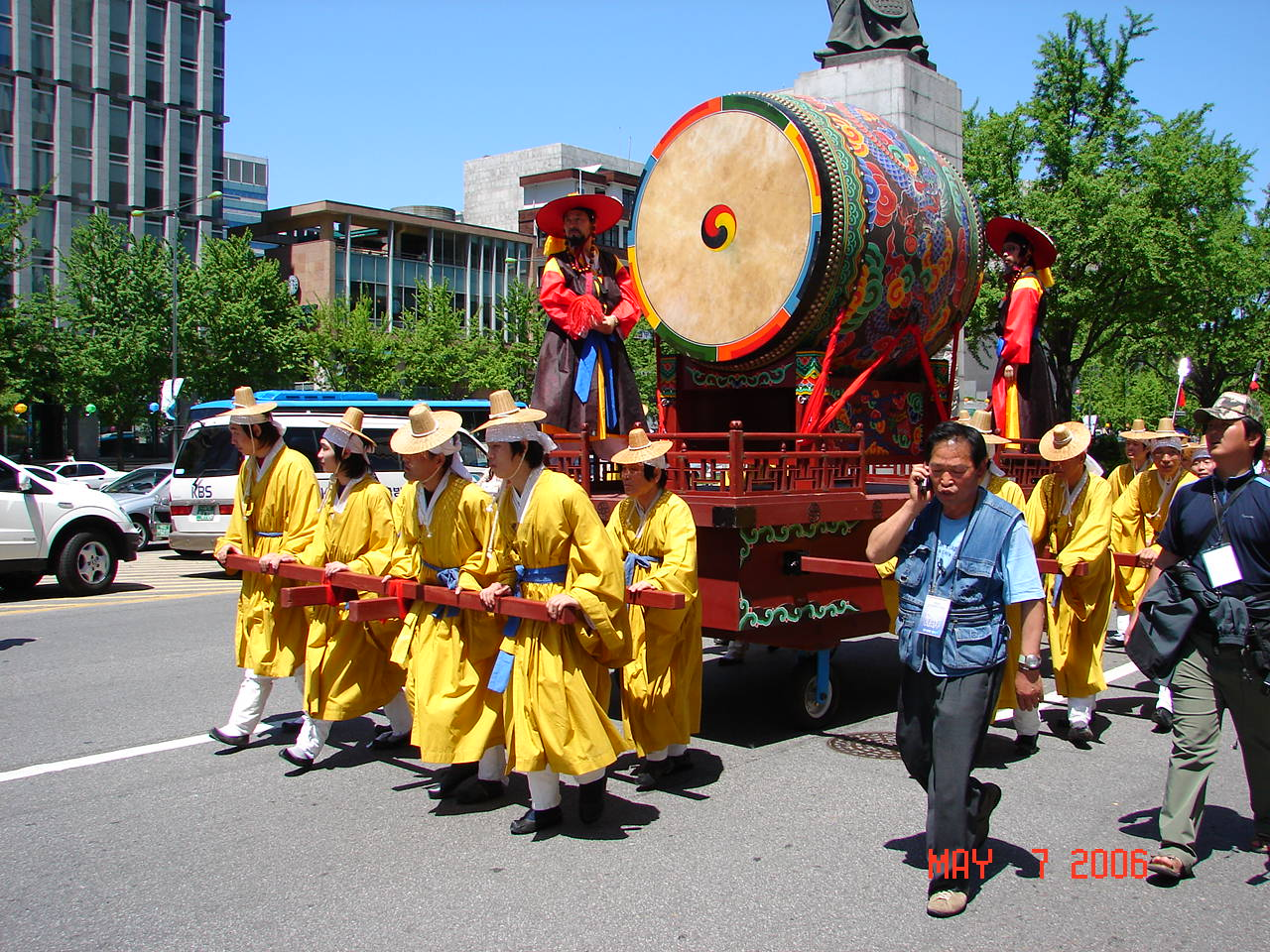
Parade

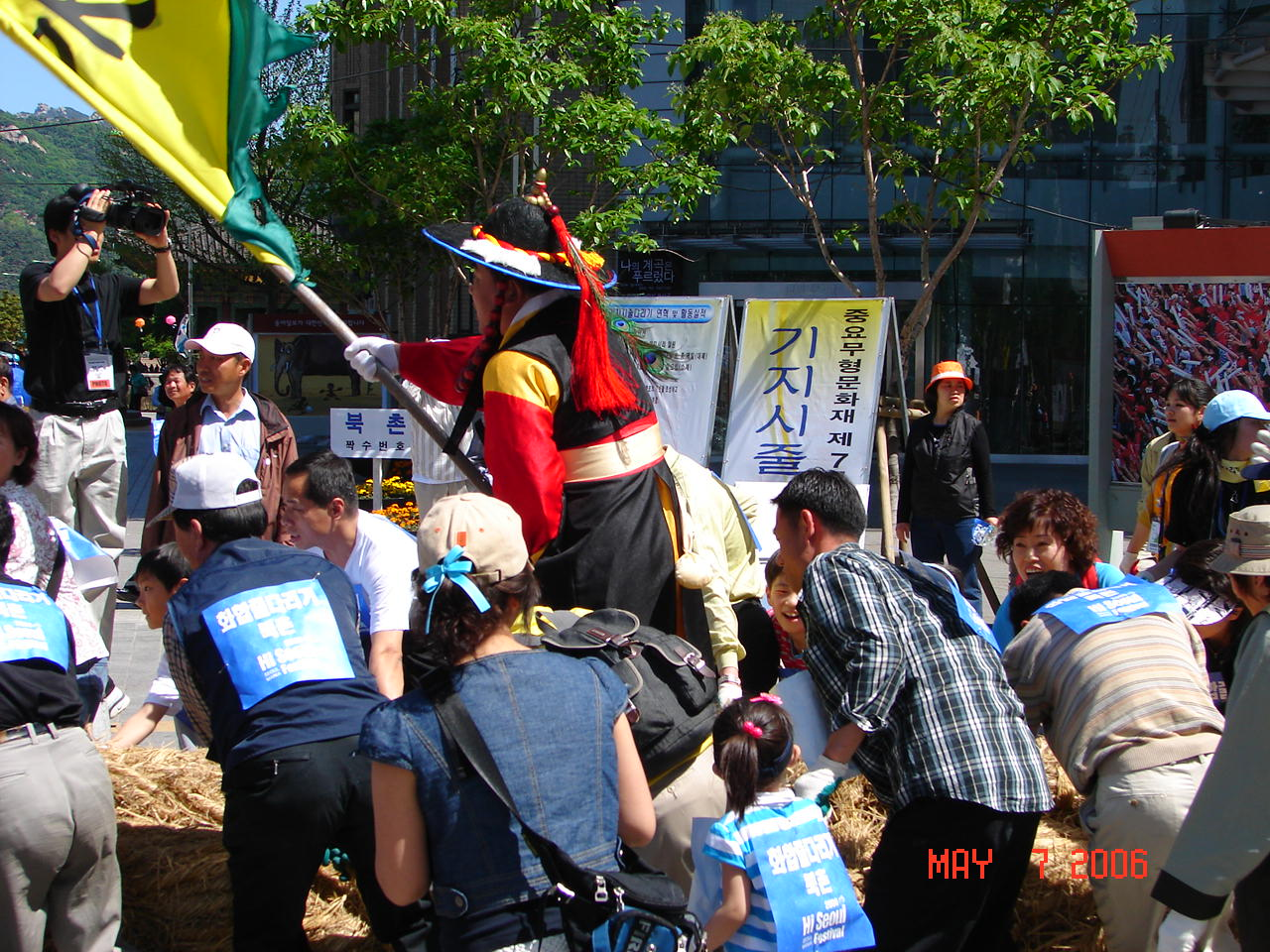
Girisi juldarigi (기리시 줄다리기), juldarigi (tug of war) originated in Girisi region of Dangjin country, South Chungcheong Province

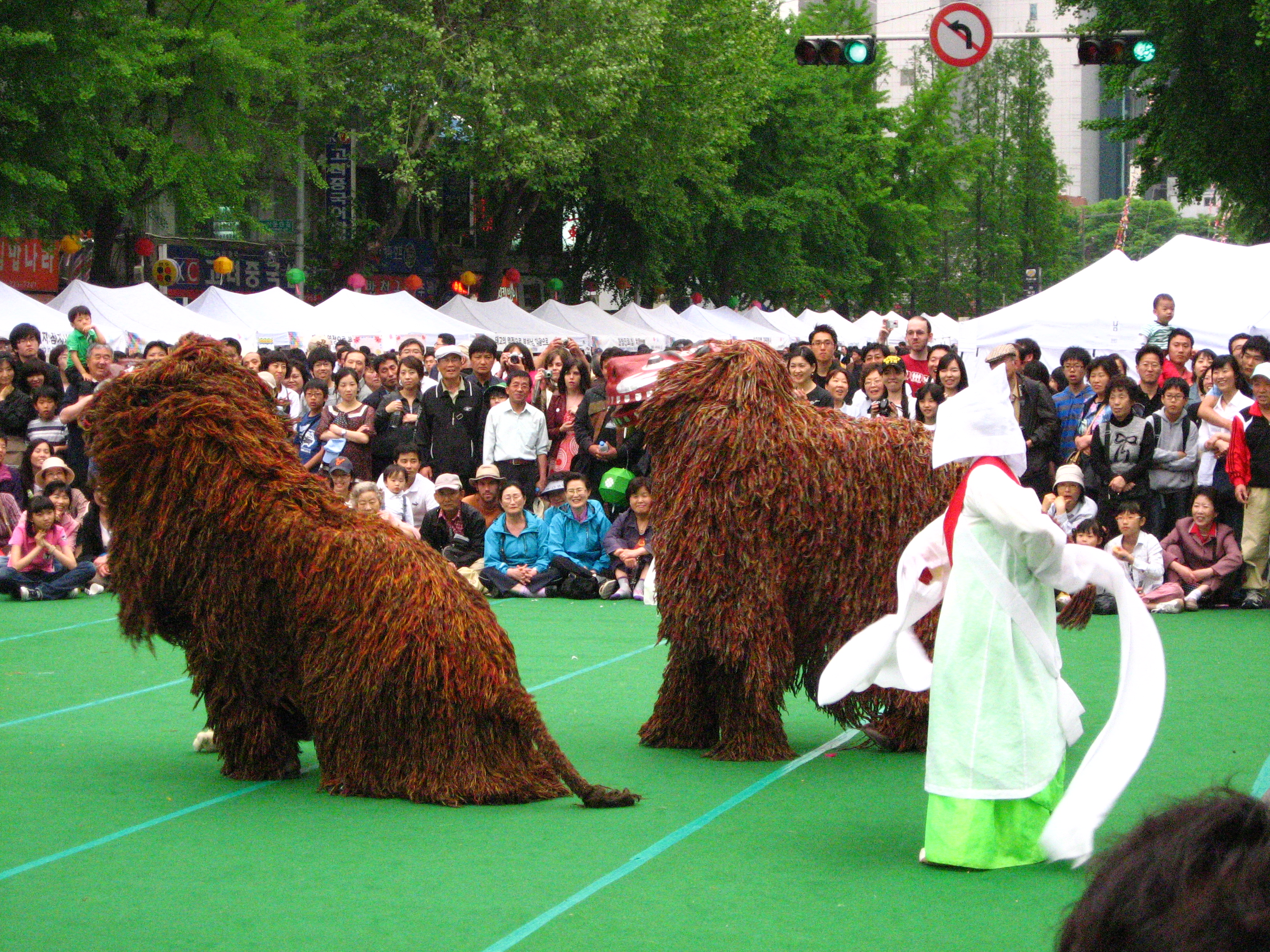
Bukcheong Sajanori (lion mask dance of Bukcheong region)

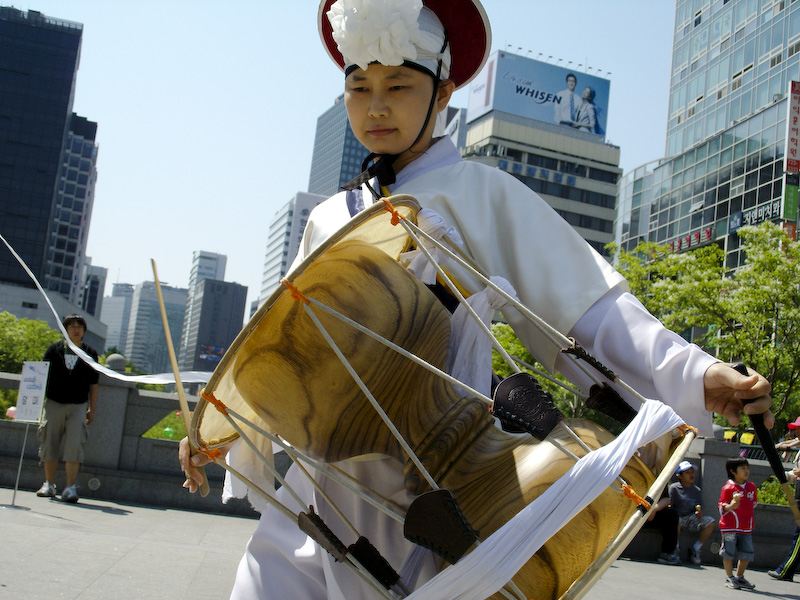
Nongak performer with janggu

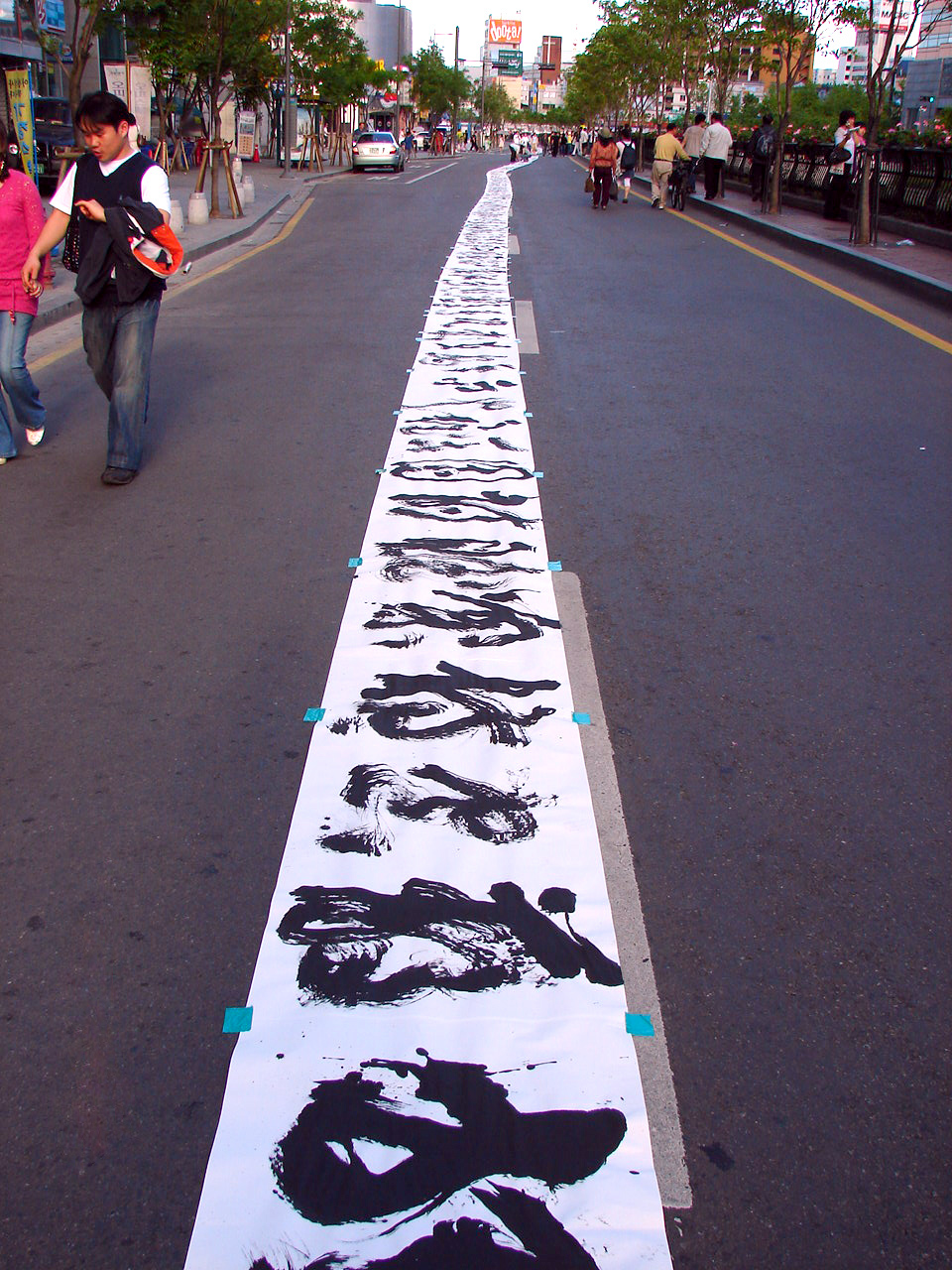
Calligraphy

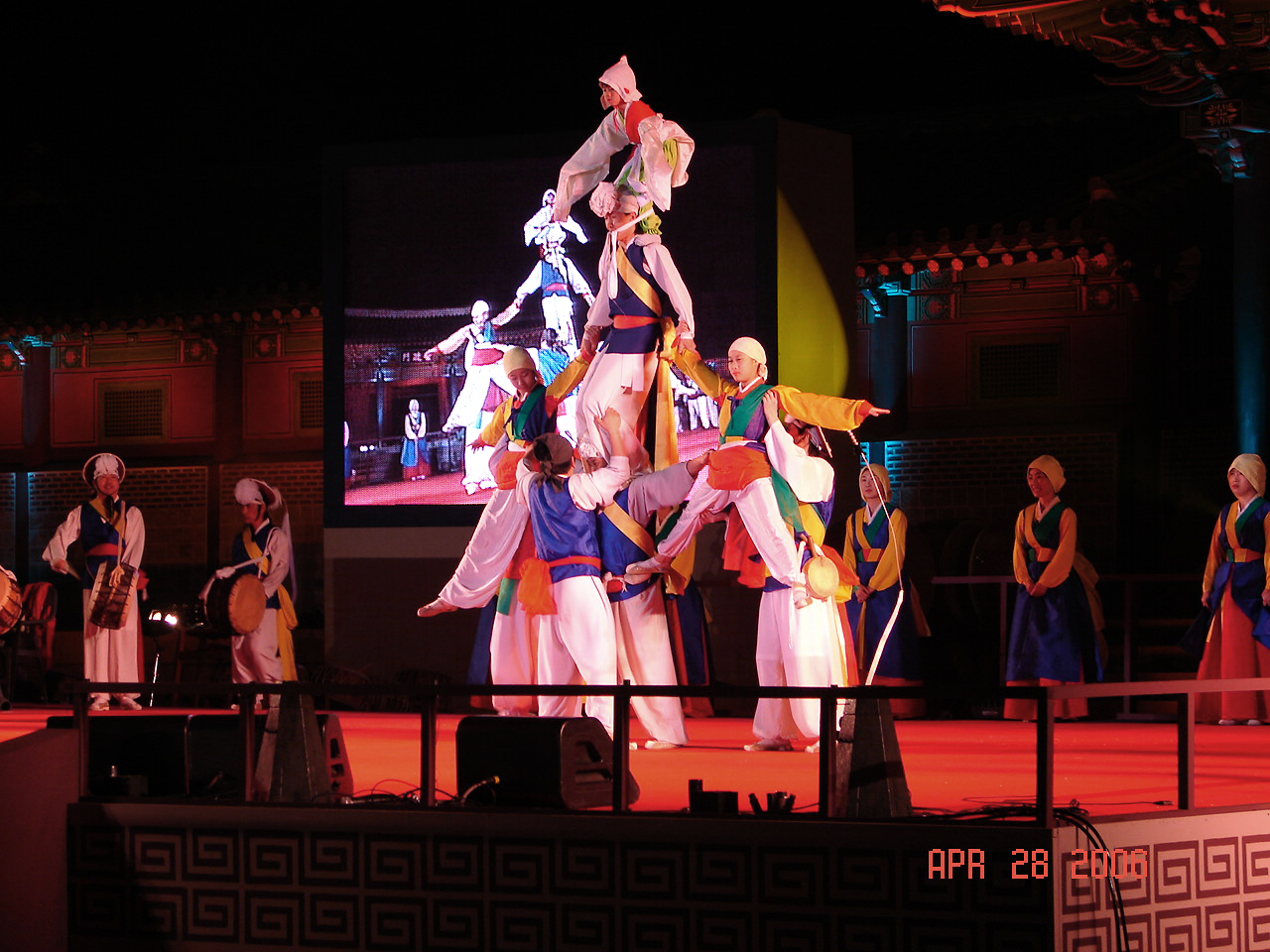
Namsadangpae (남사당패), Korean itinerant troupes consisting of male performers

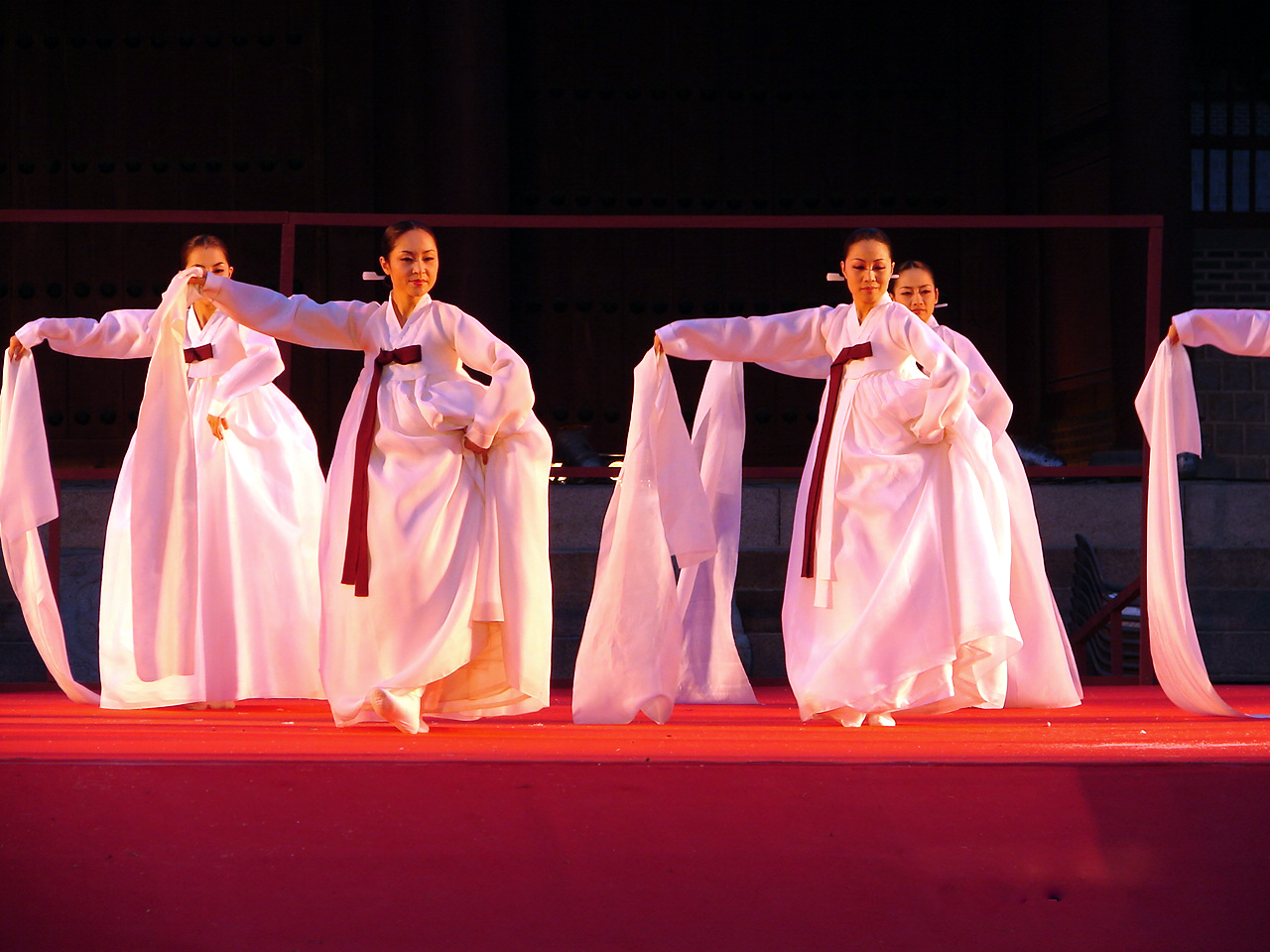
Salpurichum (살풀이춤), Korean traditional dance aimed to exorcise evil spirits

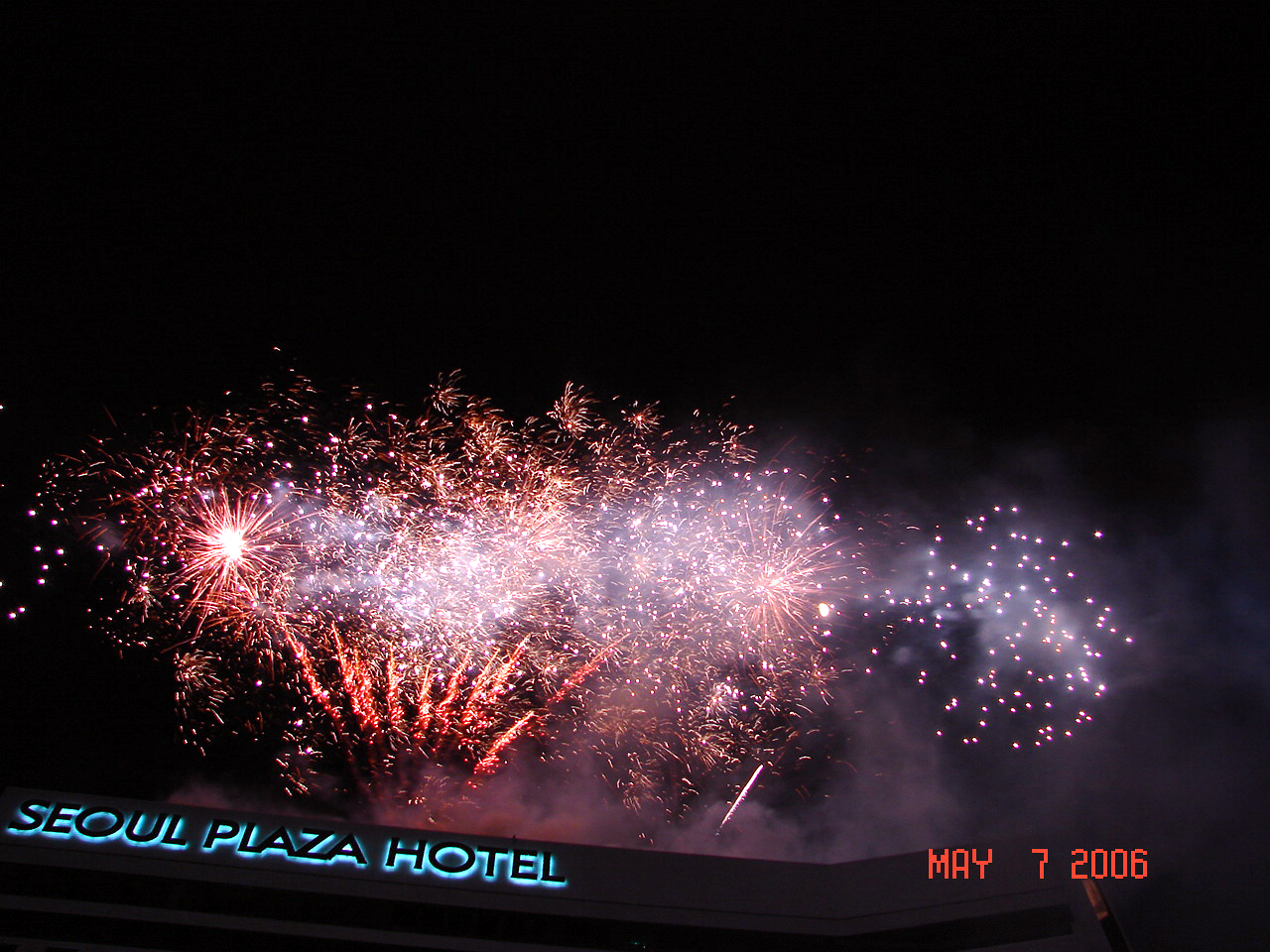
Fireworks
