= Go-Stop =

Korean card game

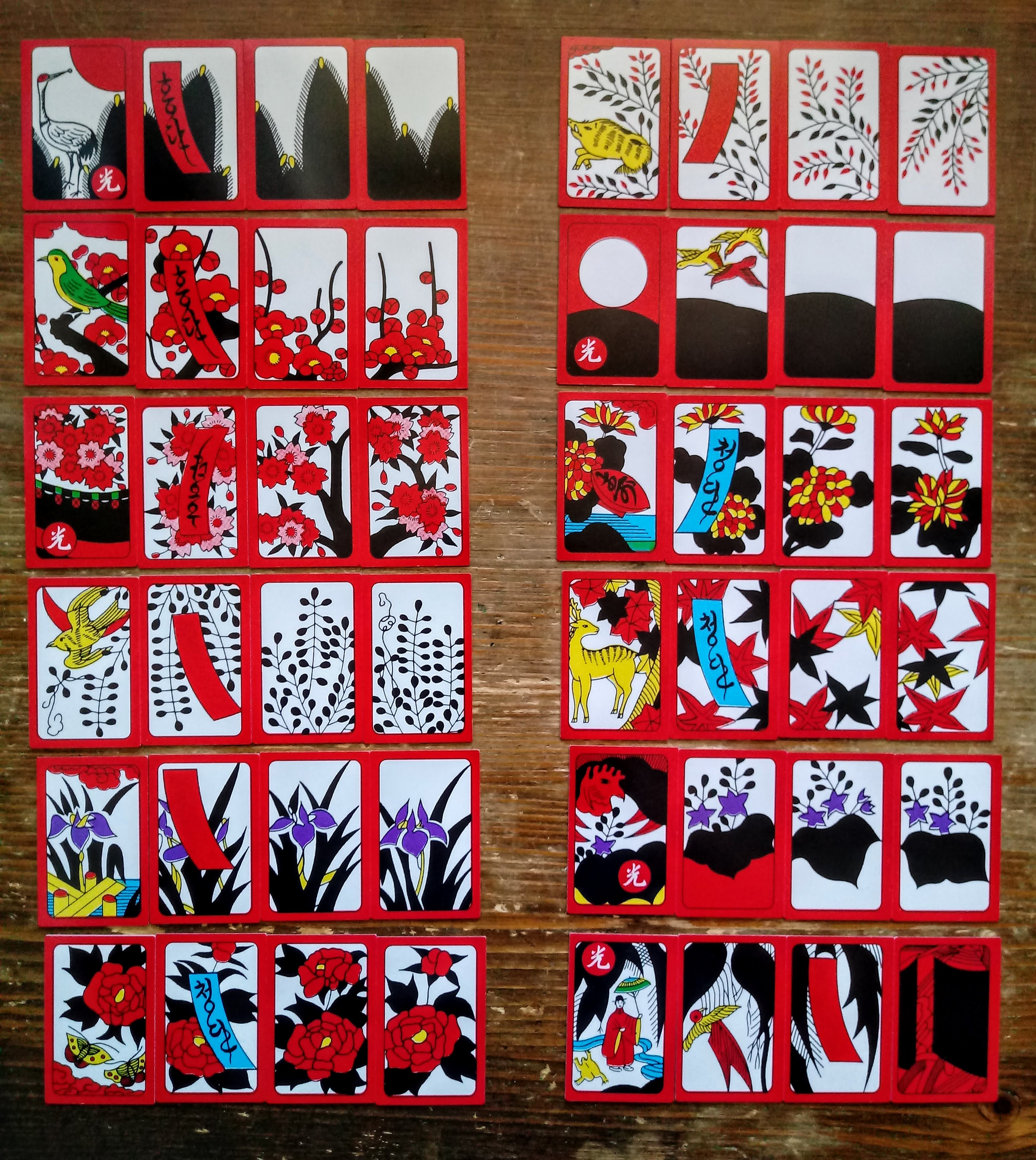
- Hwatu (cards) used in Go-Stop
- Alternative names: Godori, Matgo (when only two players are playing)
- Type: pair matching, with point scoring
- Players: 2-4, usually 3
- Skills: Probabilistic analysis, Strategic thought, bluffing to a lesser extent
- Cards: 48 cards, though sometimes special cards may be added
- Deck: Hwatu cards
- Rank (high→low): a
- Play: Counter-clockwise
- Playing time: ~10 to 15 minutes per round
- Chance: Medium

Go-Stop (Korean: 고스톱; RR: Goseutop), also called Godori (고도리, after the winning move in the game) is a Korean fishing card game played with a Hwatu (화투) deck. The game can be called Matgo (맞고) when only two players are playing.

The game is derived from similar Japanese fishing games such as Hana-awase and Hachihachi, though the Japanese hanafuda game Koi-koi is in turn partially derived from Go-Stop.

Modern Korean-produced hwatu decks usually include bonus cards specifically intended for play with Go-Stop, unlike Japanese hanafuda decks. Typically there are two or three players, although there is a variation where four players can play. The objective of this game is to score a minimum predetermined number of points, usually three or seven, and then call a "Go" or a "Stop", where the name of the game derives. When a "Go" is called, the game continues, and the number of points or amount of money is first increased, and then doubled, tripled, quadrupled and so on. A player calling "Go" risks another player scoring the minimum and winning all the points themselves. If a "Stop" is called, the game ends and the caller collects their winnings.

== History ==
The game was invented in the 1960s and became very popular in South Korea in the 1970s. The game was still described as popular there in the 1990s and 2010s.

== Significance ==
The game is the most popular Hwatu-type game in South Korea.

=== Gambling ===
The game is commonly used as a light form of gambling. Though the game can be played without money, it is considered more entertaining with the gambling aspect, with households commonly playing at ₩100 per point.

The game is played with great caution outside the family household, if ever played, as the gambling aspect brings the possibility of cheating, including hiding cards and introducing foreign cards to improve a hand.

Online Go-stop venues have been used in illegal gambling in South Korea .

== Setup ==
Hwatu cards and suits
Suit	Type				
Suit	Bright 광	Animal 끗	Ribbon 띠	Junk 피	Double Junk 쌍피
January 송학					
February 매화					
March 벚꽃					
April 등꽃					
May 난초		†			
June 모란					
July 흑싸리					
August 공산					
September 국화		†			
October 단풍					
November 오동					
December 비			‡		
Notes: † The 'Animal' cards for May and September may be counted as "double junk" cards ‡ The 'Ribbon' card for December is not counted as a ribbon card

To select a dealer (선; seon; lit. ''first''), each player picks random cards from the deck and the person who chooses the earliest or latest month card becomes the dealer, depending on whether it is nighttime or daytime, with nighttime favoring the earliest month card, January, and the latest month card, December, favored during daytime. Before the cards are dealt, the dealer shuffles them by holding the deck in the left hand with the cards face-down and pulling out random stacks of cards with the right hand to stack them on top. The dealer must repeat this process several times. After shuffling, the dealer holds the deck out to the player to their left in for them to cut the deck. If there are only two players, the opponent cuts the deck.

=== Deal ===
- Two players: The dealer places four cards face-up on the table then deals five cards to their opponent's hand and five cards to their hand. Then the dealer places another four cards face-up on the table and deals another five cards to each player's hand, starting with the opponent.
- Three players: The dealer places three cards face-up on the table then deals four cards to each player's hand, starting with the player to the right and continuing counterclockwise. Then the dealer places another three cards face-up on the table and deals another three cards to each player's hand, again starting with the player on the right.

The remaining cards are placed face down on top of the cut portion of the deck in the center of the table to form a draw pile. Before the play begins, the players check for sets of two, three or four cards of the same month on the table. If there is a set, they pile it up on top of each other, usually leaving space on each of the top part of the cards.

== Gameplay ==
=== Overview ===
1. Play begins with the dealer and continues counterclockwise.
2. A turn begins with a player attempting to match one of the cards lying face-up on the table with a card of the same month in their hand. If there are two cards of the same month already on the table, the player may select one of them. If the player has no cards matching the cards on the table, the player discards a card to the table.
3. The turn continues with the player flipping over the top card from the draw pile and looking for a card of the same month on the table. If the player finds a matching card on the table, the player collects both cards along with the cards matched in step 2. Otherwise, the drawn card is added to the table.
4. If the card drawn from the top of the draw pile in step 3 matches the two cards matched in step 2, the three cards remain on the table. This is known as ppeok (뻑). The three cards remain until a player collects them using the fourth card of the same month.
5. If a player draws a card that matches the card discarded in step 2, the player collects both cards as well as one junk card (pi) from each opponent's stock pile. This is known as jjok (쪽).
6. If a player plays a card in step 2 for which two matching cards are already on the table, and then draws the fourth matching card from the draw pile in step 3, the player collects all four cards as well as one junk card (pi) from each opponent's stock pile. This is known as ttadak (따닥).
7. The object of the game is to create scoring combinations to accumulate points up to a score of either three (for three players) or seven (for two players), at which point a "Go" or a "Stop" must be called.
8. A game that ends with neither a "Go" nor "Stop" call is called a Nagari game (나가리). The dealer and play order of the next game remain the same as with the Nagari game, and when the game ends, the loser owes the winner double money.

=== Additional rules ===
- Any player who has a set of three cards of the same month in their hand can show them to the other players in what is referred to as "shaking" the cards (흔들기; heundeulgi). Each time a player shakes within a single hand, final points are doubled in the event that that player wins the hand.
- If a player has a set of three cards of the same month in their hand and the fourth card of that month is on the table, the player may play all three cards in one turn and collect all four cards as well as one junk card (pi) from each player's stock pile. This is known as a poktan (폭탄; lit. ''bomb''). Shaking the cards before playing a poktan is also an option. A player who has played a poktan may then choose to skip step 2 above in as many as two turns (i.e. the player's turn consists only of drawing one card from the draw pile).
- Any player who has a set of four cards of the same month can show them to the other players and win the hand immediately.
- If there is a set of three cards of the same month on the table, they are combined into one stack. The player who collects the pile using the fourth card of that month will also collect one junk card (pi) from each player's stock pile.
- If there is a set of four cards of the same month on the table, the cards are reshuffled and redealt by the same dealer.
- If there is a bonus card on the table during initial deal, the dealer collects the bonus card and turns the top card of the draw pile face-up and places it on the table.
- If a player is dealt a bonus card, they may add it to their stock pile at the beginning of any turn and draw a card from the draw pile to replace it in their hand.
- If a player draws a bonus card from the draw pile during their regular turn, they will automatically collect it along with any other cards matched during that turn, except in the event of a ppeok, in which all four cards (i.e. the three cards involved in the ppeok plus the bonus card) must remain on the table.

=== Point system ===
There are several ways to collect points in Go-Stop.

Bright (광; gwang)

Jan
송학

Mar
벚꽃

Aug
공산

Nov
오동

Dec
비

- Bright cards (광; gwang): One way to accumulate points in Go-Stop is to collect three or more of the five Bright cards (gwang). In most Korean hwatu decks, these are identified with the Chinese character 光.
  - When three gwang other than that of the month of December (referred to as bi gwang, bi meaning “rain”) are collected, this is known as "Three Brights" (sam gwang) and is worth three points.
  - However, if the Three Brights include bi gwang, this is called "Wet Three Brights" (bi sam gwang), and is worth two points.
  - When four gwang are collected, this is called "Four Brights" (sa gwang) and is worth four points. It does not matter whether 'bi gwang' is included in "Four Brights" or not.
  - When all five gwang are collected, this is called "Five Brights" (o gwang) and is worth 15 to 50 points, depending on house rules.
Ribbon (띠; tti)

Jan
송학

Feb
매화

Mar
벚꽃

Apr
등꽃

May
난초

Jun
모란

Jul
흑싸리

Sep
국화

Oct
단풍

- Red poetry (홍단; hong dan) : Jan, Feb, Mar
- Red (초단; cho dan) : Apr, May, Jul
- Blue (청단; cheong dan) : Jun, Sep, Oct
- Ribbon cards (띠; tti; lit. ''band''): Another way to accumulate points is by acquiring five or more of the nine Ribbon cards. A set of any five Ribbon cards is worth one point, and each additional Ribbon card after five is worth one additional point. For example, a set of six Ribbon cards is worth two points and a set of seven Ribbon cards is worth three points.
  - Although there are ten cards with ribbons, the ribbon card for December is excluded.
  - In addition to the points associated with five or more Ribbon cards, points may also be accumulated by collecting a set of three matched Ribbon cards. There are three blue Ribbon cards (청단; cheong dan), three red Ribbon cards with poetry (홍단; hong dan), and three red Ribbon cards without poetry (초단; cho dan). Note the December Ribbon card, which is also red and without poetry, is excluded. Each of these combinations is worth three points.
  - Moreover, the two methods of accumulating points via Ribbon cards are combined. If a player collects six Ribbon cards, including all three red poetry Ribbons and all three blue Ribbons, the player can claim three points for hong dan, three points for cheong dan, and an additional two points for having six Ribbon cards, for a total of eight points.
Animal (끗; kkeus)

Feb
매화

Apr
등꽃

May
난초

Jun
모란

Jul
흑싸리

Aug
공산

Sep
국화

Oct
단풍

Dec
비

- Five birds (고도리; godori) : Feb, Apr, Aug
- May use as double junk : May, Sep
- Animal cards (끗; kkeut; lit. ''five''): A third way to accumulate points is by collecting five or more of the nine Animal cards. The scoring system of Animal cards is similar to that of Ribbon cards. A set of any five Animal cards is worth one point, and each additional Animal card after five is worth an additional point. For example, a set of six Animal cards is worth two points, and a set of seven Animal cards is worth three points.
  - The bright cards with animals (January and November) are excluded.
  - Two of the Animal cards do not picture animals: May (bridge) and September (cup). These two cards may be counted instead as double junk cards.
  - In addition to this, if among the Animal cards, a special set of three cards with birds is collected, made up of the Geese (in the August suit), the Cuckoo (April), and the Nightingale (February), this set is called godori (고도리; lit. ''five birds'') and is worth five points. Although the December Animal card has a bird, it is not counted towards godori.
  - Both methods of scoring are combined, as with the Ribbon cards. Thus, if a player collects six Animal cards, including godori, the player can claim five points for godori, and two additional points for having six Animal cards, for a total of seven points.
Double junk (쌍피; ssang pi)

May
난초

Sep
국화

Nov
오동

Dec
비

Animal cards as double junk : May, Sep
- Junk cards (피; pi; lit. ''skin'') The fourth and most common way to accumulate points is by collecting junk cards. Any set of ten junk cards is worth a point and each additional card after ten is worth an additional point.
  - The junk cards are those not counted as bright, ribbon, or animal cards.
  - In addition, there are special junk cards called Double Junks (쌍피; ssang pi), which are counted as two junk cards.
  - Ten of the twelve suits have two junk cards each; November (two junk cards and one double junk card) and December (one double junk card) are the exceptions.
  - Also, the Animal cards without animals mentioned above (for the May and September suits) usually are counted as double junk cards.

=== Ending the game ===
When a player accumulates at least three (for three players) or seven (for two players) points, the player must decide if they will continue that hand by calling "Go" (고; go) or end it by calling "Stop" (스톱; seutop). If a player says "Go" once, the player must increase their score by at least one point in order to be given another opportunity to call "Go" or “Stop". A player who calls “Go” once has one point added to their final score. With two "Go"s, two points are added. With the third "Go", the score is doubled. After the third “Go” (in which the score is doubled), the score is multiplied by the number one less than the number of times the winner has called "Go". But before calling "Go", the winner must consider whether another player may increase their score to at least three or seven points within the next turn.

When "Stop" is called, any non-winning players who have called "Go" have their penalty (calculated from the winning player's total points) doubled. This is called go bak. If a non-winning player has no Bright cards when the winner has accumulated points by collecting Bright cards, the player without Bright cards will have their penalty doubled. This is known as gwang bak. Further, if a non-winning player has fewer than six junk cards and the winner has accumulated points by collecting junk cards, the non-winning player will have their penalty doubled. This is known as pi bak. All of these are cumulative.

As an example, if a player accumulates seven or more points through only Ribbon cards and Animal cards, the player may then call "Go". If, however, before the first player is given another opportunity to call "Go" or "Stop" another player accumulates at least seven points through both Bright cards and junk cards and subsequently calls "Stop", the first player is subject to go bak, gwang bak and pi bak. Thus, the player's penalty would be doubled three times, or multiplied by eight.
