= Hanafuda =

Japanese playing cards

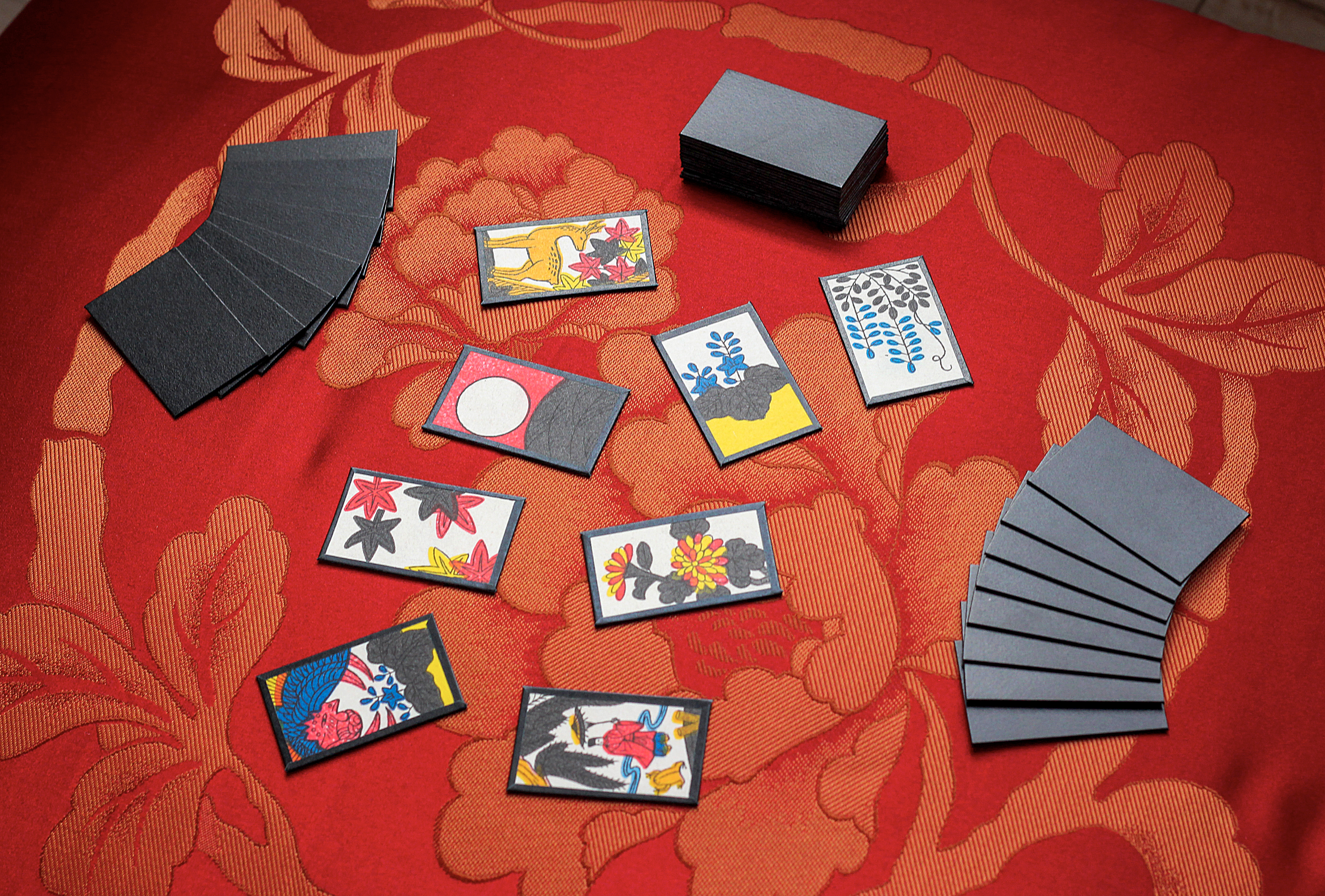
A typical setup with hanafuda for playing Koi-Koi

Hanafuda (花札; lit. 'flower cards')) are a type of Japanese playing cards. They are typically smaller than Western playing cards, only 5.4 by 3.2 centimetres (2.1 by 1.3 in), but thicker and stiffer. On the face of each card is a depiction of plants, tanzaku (短冊; 'paper strips'), animals, birds, or man-made objects. One single card depicts a human. The back side is usually plain, without a pattern or design of any kind, and traditionally colored either red or black. Hanafuda are used to play a variety of games including Koi-Koi and Hachi-Hachi.

== Outside Japan ==
In Korea, hanafuda are known as hwatu (

Korean: 화투, Hanja:

花鬪, 'flower battle') and made of plastic with a textured back side, and the November and December suites are switched compared with Japanese hanafuda. Many games exist, such as minhwatu (

Korean: 민화투), seotda (

Korean: 섰다), nairong-ppong (

Korean: 나이롱뽕), and wolnam-ppong (

Korean: 월남뽕). The most popular game is Go-stop (

Korean: 고스톱), commonly played during special holidays such as Lunar New Year and Chuseok (

Korean: 추석).

In Hawaii, hanafuda is used to play Sakura. Hanafuda is also played in Micronesia, where it is known as hanahuda and is used to play a four-person game, which is often played in partnerships.

== History ==
Playing cards were introduced to Japan by the Portuguese in the mid-16th century. The Portuguese deck consisted of 48 cards, with four suits divided into 12 ranks. The first Japanese-made decks made during the Tenshō period (1573–1592) mimicked Portuguese decks and are referred to as Tenshō Karuta. The main game was a trick-taking game intermediate in evolution between Triunfo and Ombre. After Japan closed off all contact with the Western world in 1633, foreign playing cards were banned.

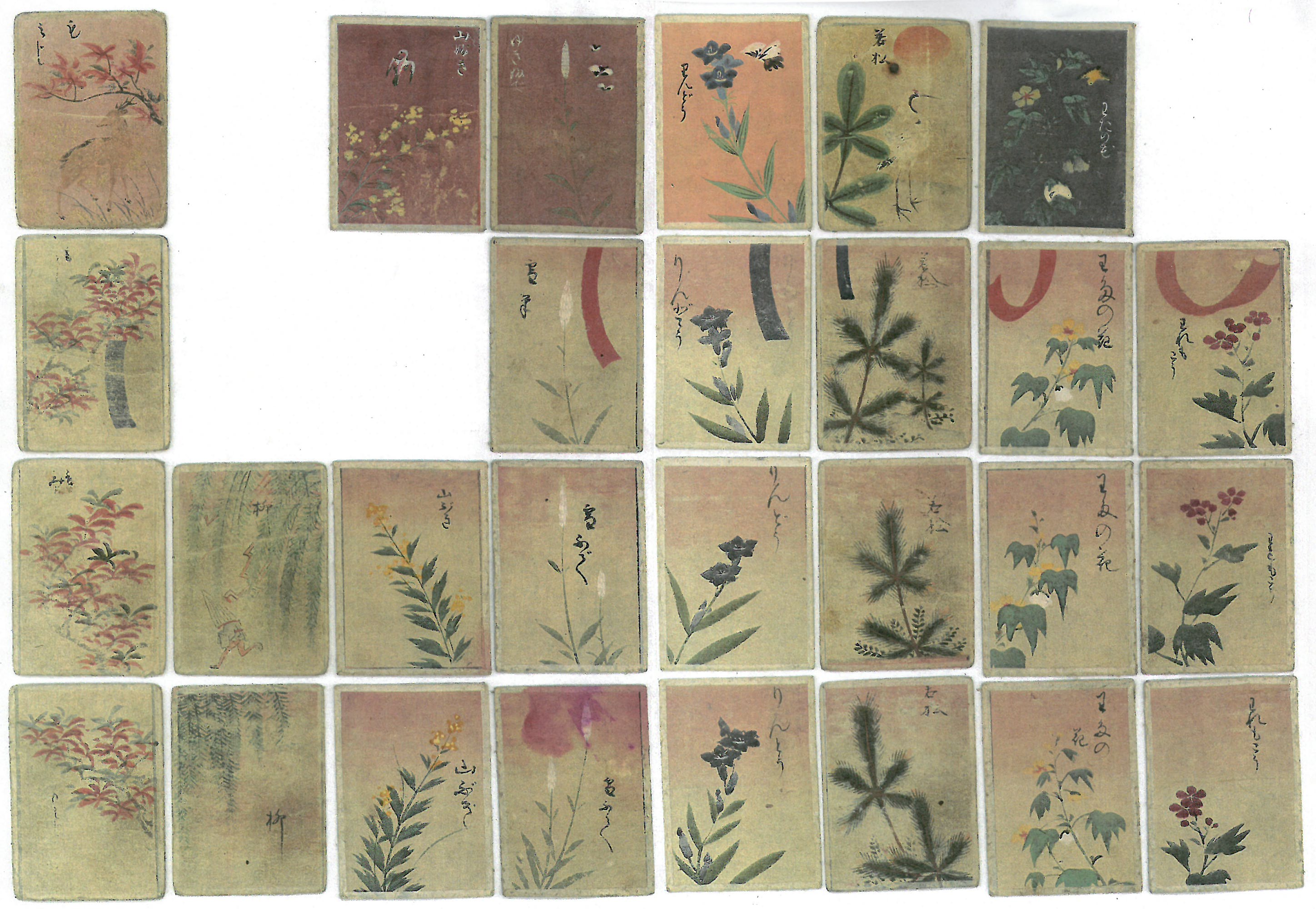
Hana awase cards from c. 1700, by painter Tosa Mitsunari (1646–1710). A predecessor of hanafuda. This card set contained 100 suits of 4 cards each. Cards depicted here include direct equivalents of modern hanafuda, such as pine with crane and rising sun, maple with deer, and willow with umbrella yōkai.

In 1648, Tenshō Karuta were banned by the Tokugawa shogunate. During prohibition, gambling with cards remained highly popular which led to disguised card designs. Each time gambling with a card deck of a particular design became too popular, the government banned it, which then prompted the creation of a new design. This cat-and-mouse game between the government and rebellious gamblers resulted in the creation of increasingly abstract and minimalist regional patterns (地方札). These designs were initially called Yomi Karuta after the popular Poch-like game of Yomi which was known by the 1680s.

Through the Meiwa, An'ei, and Tenmei eras (roughly 1764–1789), a game called Mekuri took the place of Yomi. It became so popular that Yomi Karuta was renamed Mekuri Karuta. Mechanically, Mekuri is similar to Chinese fishing games. Cards became so commonly used for gambling that they were banned in 1791, during the Kansei era. On the other hand, Uta-garuta such as Hyakunin Isshu were officially permitted as being educationally beneficial. So as a loophole to the ban, early hanafuda were made to have old poems on some of the cards, disguising them as Uta-garuta. Remnants of this can be seen via the tanzaku-ranked cards.

The earliest known reference to hana awase (a previous version of hanafuda) is from 1816 when it was recorded as a banned gambling tool. The earliest decks contained between 12, 20, and even 32 suits, each with one high value card, one tanzaku card, and two low-value cards.

As hana awase modernized into hanafuda, it standardized at 12 months (suits) with four rank-like categories. The majority of hanafuda games are descended from Mekuri although Yomi adaptations for the flower cards survived until the 20th century. Though they can still be used for gambling, its structure and design is less convenient than other decks such as Kabufuda. In the Meiji period, playing cards became tolerated by the authorities.

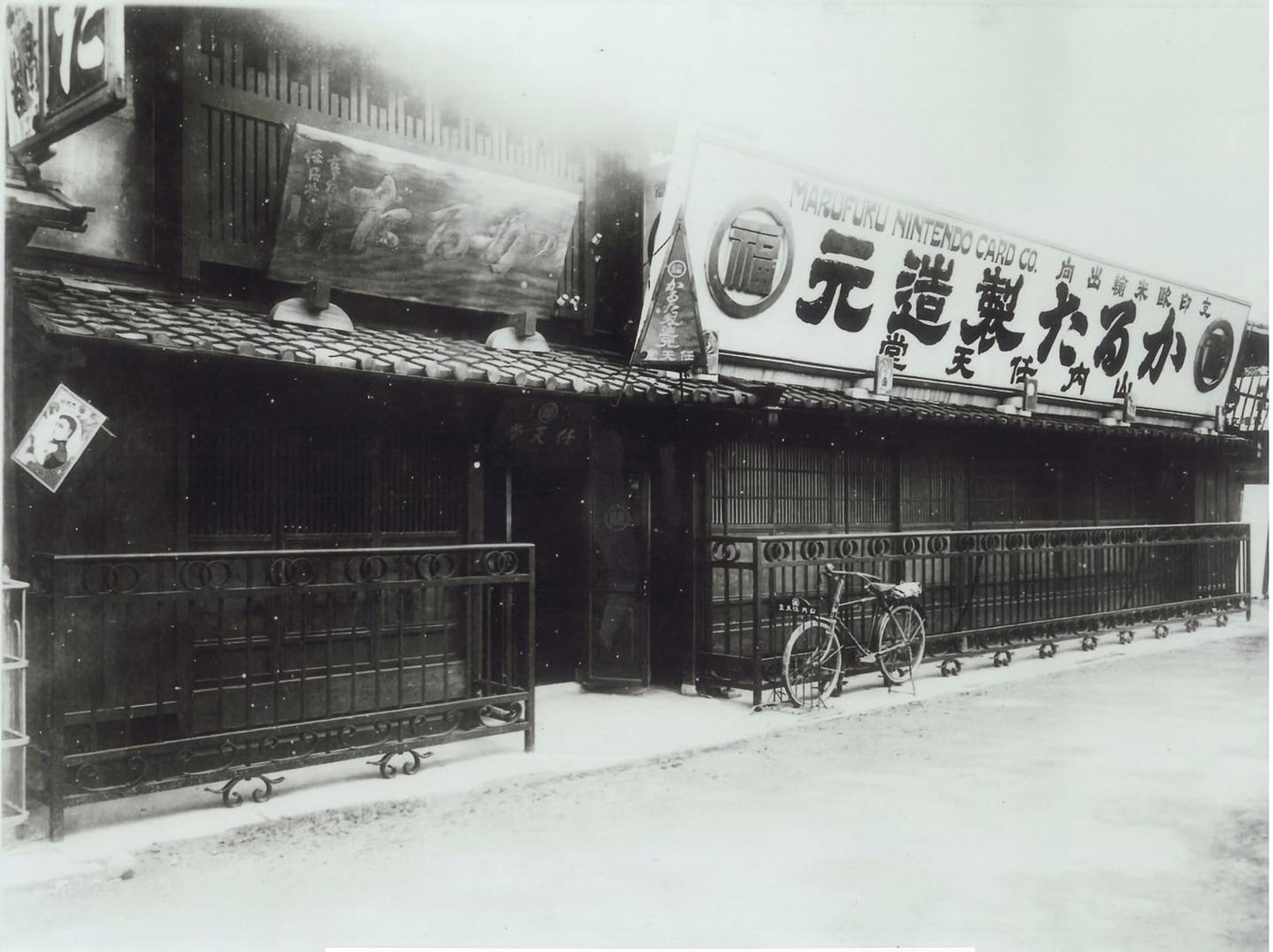
Marufuku Nintendo Card Company building in Shimogyō-ku, Kyoto

In 1889, Fusajiro Yamauchi founded Nintendo for the purposes of producing and selling hand-crafted hanafuda. Nintendo has focused on video games since the 1970s but continues to produce cards in Japan, including themed sets based on Mario, Pokémon, and Kirby. The Koi-Koi game played with hanafuda is included in Nintendo's own Clubhouse Games (2006) for the Nintendo DS, and Clubhouse Games: 51 Worldwide Classics (2020) for the Nintendo Switch.

Though modern Japanese hanafuda is primarily made today by either of the long-standing Oishi Tengudo (1800) or Nintendo (1889), dozens of others have manufactured hanafuda, such as Angel, Tamura Shogundo, Matsui Tengudo, Ace, Maruē, and many more.

Playing card (fused Jack of Spades and November Hikari) from the Beinecke Rare Book & Manuscript Library, Yale University

Hanafuda were likely introduced to Korea during the late 1890s and to Hawaii in the early 1900s. Since then, companies and individuals in Korea and Hawaii have produced their own hanafuda, sometimes adapting the original Japanese imagery to fit either culture. Also made for western audiences are decks which fuse hanafuda with Toranpu (トランプ, "Trumps" a.k.a. the standard 52-card deck). These decks have indices on all their cards, and introduce a 13th suit which varies considerably by manufacturer (jokers, flowers, objects from Japanese imagery, left blank or used as a "snow" suit, left as western Kings, etc.).

== Cards ==
There are 48 cards total, divided into twelve suits, representing months of the year. Each suit is designated by a flower and has four cards. An extra blank card may be included to serve as a replacement. In Korean hwatu decks, several joker cards (조커패) award various bonuses.

The standard categorizations and point values for each card are as follows. Note that some games change the point values or categorizations of the cards. For example, in the game Hachi-Hachi, all of the November cards count as kasu, and in the game Sakura, the values of the cards are different.

Composition of a hanafuda deck
Month/suit Flower	Bright (光, hikari) (20 points)	Animal (種, tane) (10 points)	Paper strip (短冊, tanzaku) (5 points)	Chaff (粕; 糟, kasu) or Su (素) (1 point)	
January Pine	Red-crowned crane and Sun		Poetry tanzaku		2 cards
February Plum blossom		Bush warbler (Note: In the mid-Edo period, only the bush warbler card had red plum blossoms, while the rest had whitish flowers. Hanafuda from the mid-Edo period had a fairly dull color for the eyes (darker than the leaves of Iris or Paulownia) and were closer to the color of an actual bush warbler, while modern designs more closely resemble a warbling white-eye though the eyes are red.)	Poetry tanzaku		2 cards
March Cherry blossom	Curtain		Poetry tanzaku		2 cards
April Wisteria		Lesser cuckoo (Note: Hanafuda from the mid-Edo period had no background, only the wisteria and the cuckoo. The color of the flowers were quite pale. Later in the Meiji period, the flowers became darker and red clouds began to appear. Around the 1880s, the current "red crescent moon" began to appear.)	Plain tanzaku		2 cards
May Water iris		Eight-plank bridge	Plain tanzaku		2 cards
June Peony (Note: In the mid-Edo period, the score cards had a white peony design, while the Kasu had a red peony design or two red and white cards.)		Butterflies	Blue tanzaku		2 cards
July Bush clover (Note: In the mid-Edo period, the color of the flowers were quite pale, but in later periods, the color became darker.)		Boar	Plain tanzaku		2 cards
August Susuki grass (Note: Sometimes 芒 susuki is translated as pampas (grass).)	Full moon (Note: The "bright red night sky" is said to have changed from plain or light blue in the early period, to yellow or light pink in the late Edo period, to bright red in the Meiji period. Also, during the era of woodblock printing, the moon was hidden at the bottom or left edge (sometimes a crescent moon). White was the color of the unprinted parts, so it was difficult to paint around it and leave it alone while using woodblocks.)	Geese (Note: Throughout the Edo period to today, the three geese are depicted flying in the shape of the letter く, but around the 1880s, they were flying in a parallel line like 三 and filled the entire sky. For this reason, geese were considered large birds and formed a yaku with the Crane and Hōō in some games.)			2 cards
September Chrysanthemum (Note: In the mid-Edo period, one of the kasu had a red chrysanthemum while the rest were white chrysanthemums. From the late Edo period onwards, cards with yellow-red flowers began to appear.)		Sake cup	Blue tanzaku		2 cards
October Maple		Sika deer	Blue tanzaku		2 cards
November (Note: In the Korean hwatu version, the November and December suits are swapped.) Willow	Ono no Michikaze; or Rain Man; or figure with umbrella (Note: Originally, the figure with umbrella was a yōkai (amefurikozō), whom people from the Edo period recognized as the highwayman Sadakurō from the play Kanadehon Chūshingura. In 1886, the publisher Maeda Kihei (前田喜兵衛) negotiated with manufacturers in Kyoto and Osaka to change the design from Sadakurō to the calligrapher Ono no Michikaze to improve the image.)	Barn swallow (Note: Today, the swallows are brightly colored yellow and red, but in the mid-Edo period, they were normal swallow colors (black with a red throat).)	Plain tanzaku	Lightning (Note: This card's design is significantly different from the other rain cards, but from the Edo to early Meiji periods, it was like other kasu with only a willow tree drawn on it. In the early 1880s, it began being painted solid red, and in the late 1880s, the picture was changed from a sunny willow tree to the lightning drum in the rain.)	1 card
December Paulownia	Hōō				3 cards

=== Text significance ===
A few cards in hanafuda contain Japanese text. In addition to the examples below, the December kasu cards typically display the manufacturer's name and marks, similar to the Ace of spades in western playing cards.

Cards	Description
	akayoroshi (あかよろし) with the hentaigana character 𛀙 for ka. It is an old Japanese phrase that means "truly wonderful," related to the phrase akiraka ni yoroshii (明らかに宜しい; "obviously good") in modern standard Japanese.
	mi-Yoshino (みよしの; "beautiful Yoshino") refers to Yoshino, Nara, known for its Somei-Yoshino hybrid cherry trees
	kotobuki (寿; "long life")

Edo-period hanafuda frequently had poems on them in order to disguise themselves as uta-garuta (poem playing cards) with illustrations. This tradition continued on some cards produced after the ban on playing cards was lifted, but it is now rare. Cards that have lines of poetry on them are usually the less ornate kasu cards.

Cards made early after the end of the ban often had the name of the corresponding month on the tanzaku cards, and sometimes numbers on all the cards. This made it easier for new players to play games that require knowing what suit is associated with what number, such as Yomi-derived games and kabufuda games.

==== Korean ====
In Korean hwatu decks, the writing on the tanzaku cards is replaced with Korean text naming the type of card it is. Similar text is usually present on the blue tanzaku cards as well. In addition to the examples below, the manufacturer's name and marks are often prominently present on the various joker cards, and the manufacturer's logo is typically featured on the full moon card.

Cards	Description
	hongdan (홍단; 紅短), a calque of Japanese akatan (赤短), short for aka-tanzaku (赤短冊; "red tanzaku")
	cheongdan (청단; 靑短), a calque of Japanese aotan (青短), short for ao-tanzaku (青短冊; "blue tanzaku")
	su (cursive form of 壽 or 寿; "long life")

== Games ==
Mekuri-derived games:

- Hana-Awase
  - Minhwatu
  - Koi-Koi
    - Sakura
    - Go-Stop
  - Roppyakken
  - Mushi
- Hachi
- Hachi-Hachi
  - Sudaoshi
- Tensho

Yomi-derived games:

- Poka (game)
- Hiyoko
- Isuri

Gabo Japgi/Kabufuda-derived games:

- Seotda
- Dorijitgo-ttaeng

== Unicode ==
In Unicode, a symbol to represent hanafuda is available at U+1F3B4 🎴 FLOWER PLAYING CARDS in the Miscellaneous Symbols and Pictographs block. This character is typically rendered as the Full Moon with Red Sky card. It was added as part of Unicode 6.0 in 2010 for compatibility with a KDDI emoji character, and was added to Unicode Emoji 1.0 in 2015.

== See also ==
- Category:Films about hanafuda
- Category:Hanafuda manufacturers
- Kabufuda
- Karuta
- Uta-garuta
