= Sakura (card game) =

Hawaiian card game

Sakura (also known as Higobana) is a Hawaiian card game played using hanafuda.

== How to win ==
The goal of the game is to out-score the other players (or teams) by having the highest number of points. Points are won by "capturing" individual point cards and holding yaku – scoring combinations – at the end of each round.

== Dealing the cards ==
Number of players	Cards in hand	Cards face up
2	8	8
3	7	6
4	5	8
5	4	8
6	3	12
7	3	6

Note: when dealing, deal half of the face up cards first, then half of the "cards in hand" to each player, then finish dealing the rest of the face up cards and in-hand cards. This will help randomize the "hard-to-shuffle" deck.

== Game play ==
Sakura is a turn-based game that includes 48 cards that can be in one of five different states:

- Cards that are face up on the table, for all players to see;
- Cards that players are holding in their hands that only they can see;
- Cards that are worth points individually or arranged by yaku sets and have been claimed by a player, face up for all players to see;
- Cards that have been played but are worth no points: the kasu pile;
- Cards that have not yet been played yet, stacked face down in a single pile: “the mountain.”

During turn a player takes the following actions:

- The player must discard a card from their hand
  - If this card is in the same suit or family as one of the face up cards, the player then claims that card as their own, placing it face up in front of them;
  - If this card does not match the suit or family of any face up cards, then that card remains face up for someone else to claim.
- The player must then draw one card from “the mountain”
  - This card should then be played, following the same discarded card rules listed above;
  - The round ends when players run out of cards to play.

Note: when playing the Lightning or Gaiji card, you can claim any face up card of any family. When the next point card of this “claimed” family is claimed by another player – or if it is turned up from the mountain – ownership of that point card transfers to the player that used the Lightning card

== Scoring Overview ==
Based on the cards everyone has captured:

- Add 5-20 points to your score for each point card that you've captured, based on the values in the next section
- Deduct 50 points from your total score for each yaku that your opponents captured

== Scoring Cards ==
Pine	20 points Crane	10 points Tanzaku	0 points (Kasu)	0 points (Kasu)
Plum blossom	5 points Bush warbler	10 points Tanzaku	0 points (Kasu)	0 points (Kasu)
Cherry blossom	20 points Curtain	10 points Tanzaku	0 points (Kasu)	0 points (Kasu)
Wisteria	5 points Cuckoo	10 points Tanzaku	0 points (Kasu)	0 points (Kasu)
Water Iris	5 points Bridge	10 points Tanzaku	0 points (Kasu)	0 points (Kasu)
Peony	5 points Butterflies	10 points Tanzaku	0 points (Kasu)	0 points (Kasu)
Bush clover	5 points Boar	10 points Tanzaku	0 points (Kasu)	0 points (Kasu)
Susuki grass	20 points Moon	5 points Geese	0 points (Kasu)	0 points (Kasu)
Chrysanthemum	5 points Sake	10 points Tanzaku	0 points (Kasu)	0 points (Kasu)
Maple	5 points Deer	10 points Tanzaku	0 points (Kasu)	0 points (Kasu)
Willow	5 points Rainman	5 points Swallow	10 points Tanzaku	0 points Lightning
Paulownia	20 points Phoenix	10 points Flower	0 points (Kasu)	0 points (Kasu)

== Scoring Yaku ==
Drinking	Curtain	Moon	Sake
Poetry Tanzaku Animals	Crane	Bush warbler	Curtain
Three Poetry Tanzaku			
Three Blue Tanzaku			
Blue Tanzaku Animals	Butterflies	Sake	Deer
Three Red Tanzaku (excluding Willow)			
Red Tanzaku Animals	Cuckoo	Bridge	Boar
Boar-Deer-Geese	Boar	Deer	Geese
