= Tujeon =

Traditional Korean playing cards

- Hangul: 투전
- Hanja: 鬪牋
- RR: tujeon
- MR: t'ujŏn

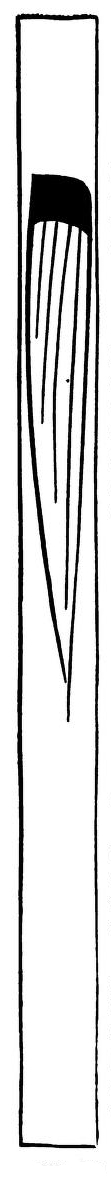
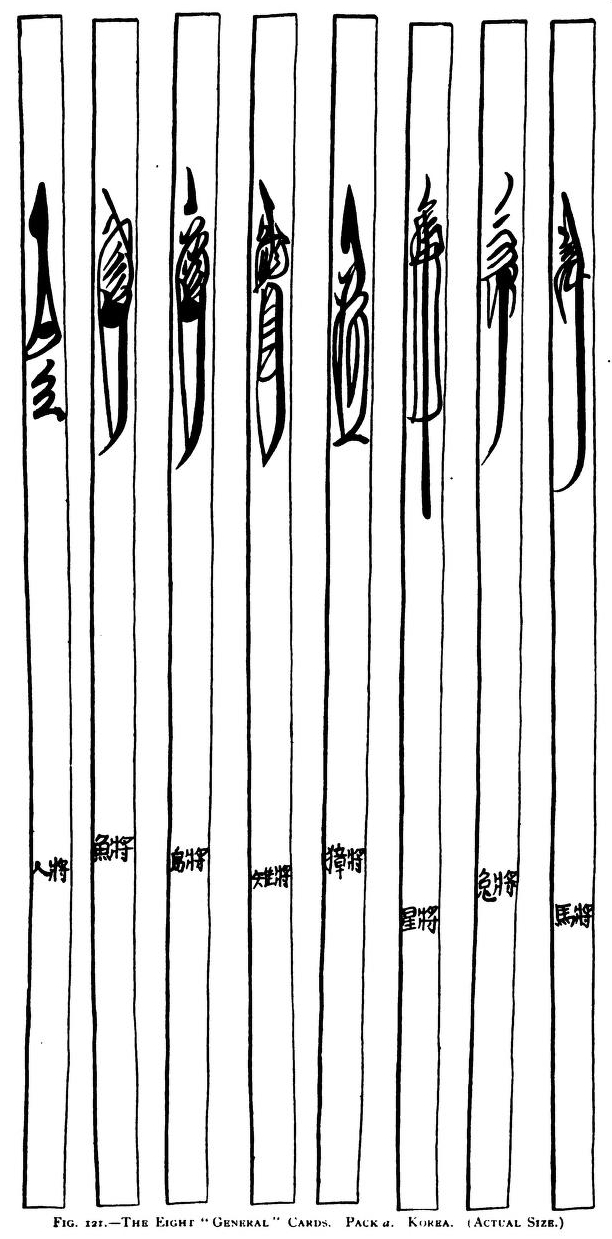
The feather-like back design (left) and the eight General cards, each marked with the symbol of its suit, from a full eight-suited deck (right)

Tujeon (Korean: 투전; Hanja: 鬪牋; lit. 'fighting tablets') are the traditional playing cards of Korea used in the latter half of the Joseon dynasty. They are also known as tupae (투패; 鬪牌; lit. 'fighting cards').

== Composition ==
A deck typically contains forty, sixty or eighty cards: nine numeral cards, and one General (jang), to each suit. In a full eight-suited deck, the suits and their generals are as follows:

- Man (사람) led by the King
- Fish (물고기) led by the Dragon
- Crow (까마귀) led by the Phoenix
- Pheasant (꿩) led by the Falcon
- Roe deer (노루) led by the Tiger
- Star (별) led by the North Star
- Rabbit (토끼) led by the Eagle
- Horse (말) led by the Wagon

Yu Deuk-gong (1749–1807) wrote in his text Kyŏngdojapchi that in the suits of stars, horses, roe deer, and rabbits, the ranking of the numeral cards are in inverted order with nine being the lowest rank and one being the second highest, outranked only by the general. This ranking can also be seen in archaic games such as Ganjifa, Madiao, Triomphe, and Unsun Karuta.

The physical cards are very long and narrow, typically measuring about 8 inches (200 mm) tall and 0.25 inches (6.4 mm) across. They are made of oiled paper or leather. The backs are usually decorated with a stylized feather design.

== History ==
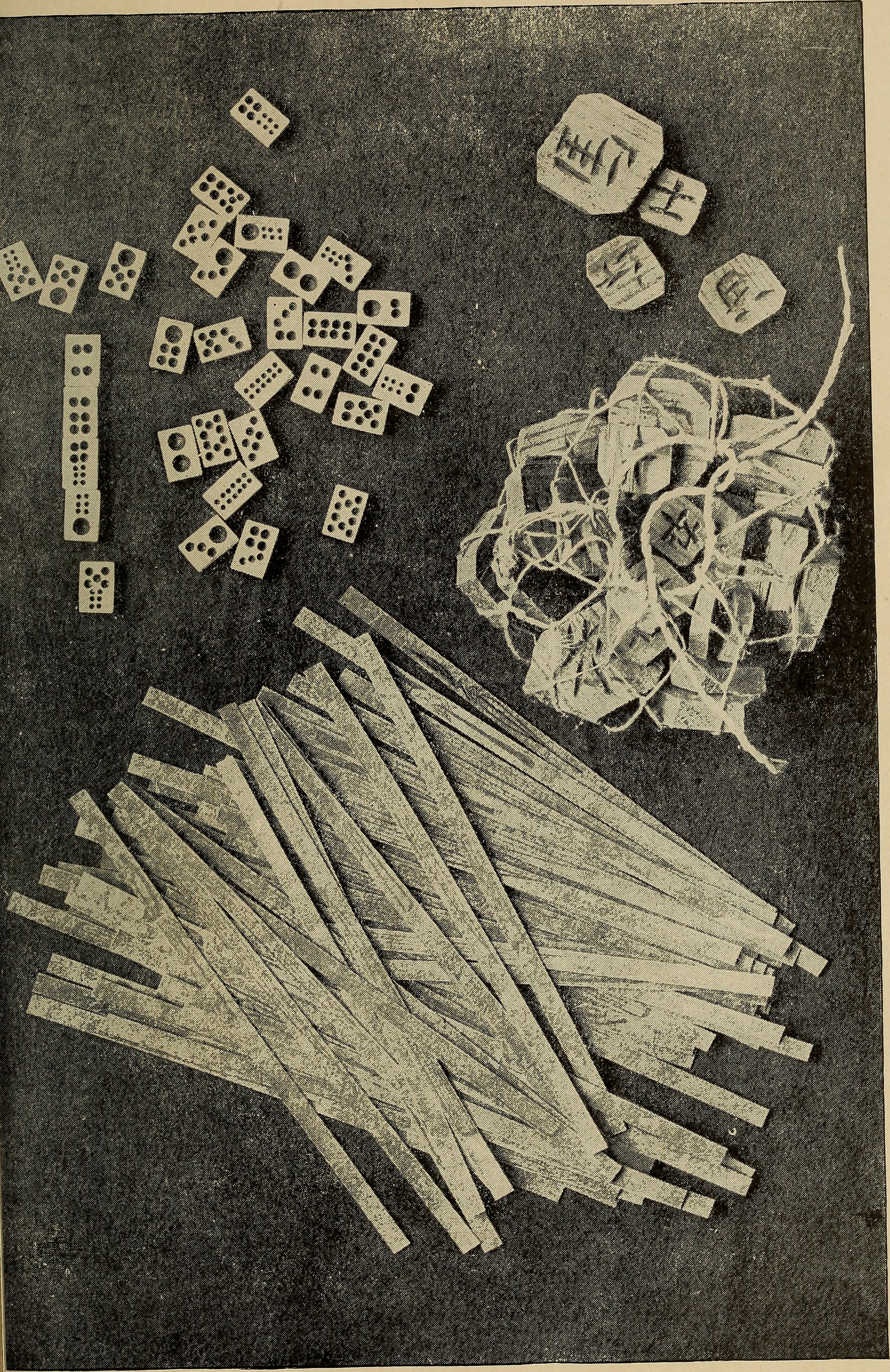
A collection of Korean game materials (ca. late 19th century), including tujeon.

In his 1895 book Korean Games, with notes on the corresponding games of China and Japan, ethnographer Stewart Culin suggested that tujeon originated from the similarly shaped symbolic bamboo "arrows" used for divination in sixth-century Korea. This hypothesis, however, is supported mainly by visual similarity and remains unsubstantiated.

Sŏng Taejung (1732–1809) claimed that Chang Hyŏn (fl. 17th century) brought the Chinese card game of Madiao back to Korea. Seong also claimed Jang simplified the cards to create tujeon while in prison and taught the game to prisoners and guards. Jang himself is believed to have died in prison. King Jeongjo (r. 1776–1800) issued several ineffective bans against tujeon after gambling was causing serious social problems.

By the early 19th century, tujeon evolved somewhat from its original form: decks were typically only forty to sixty cards in size, using four or six of the eight suits; and the numeral cards were no longer marked to distinguish their suit, being used interchangeably. Only the generals kept their suits. The cards were replaced by hanafuda during the Japanese occupation but some tujeon rules were transferred over to the Japanese cards.

== Games ==
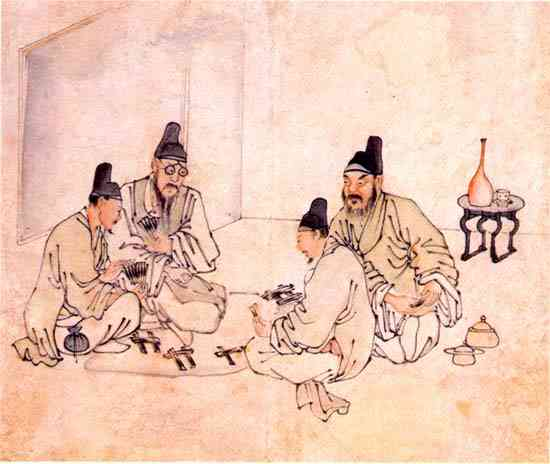
A group of men playing tujeon.

By far the most popular game was gabo japgi, so much so that the name was used interchangeably with tujeon. Also known as yeotbangmangi (엿방망이, "sweetmeat pestle"), it is a baccarat-like game similar to the Chinese domino game goryeosi (골여시). It is played with the 60 card deck and the object is to reach gabo or kapo which is gambling slang for 9. The game seems to be derived from kabufuda games where the goal is to reach kabu or kaho which is also slang for 9. Both kabu and kapo are possibly descended from the Portuguese cavo which was slang for a stake or wager. Another similar game is Komi, played with ganjapa cards, from Odisha, India along Portugal's old trade routes. Baccarat did not appear in Europe until mid-19th century France and was preceded by a simpler game called Macao, further hinting at a Portuguese connection. The rules for all these games are likely derivative of the 16th century Ming game of sanzhang (三長) which was originally played with madiao cards but modern players prefer using the French deck.

Another popular game was dongdang (동당), an early rummy game similar to khanhoo.

== In popular culture ==
- Mr. Queen in Ep. 16 being played by King Cheoljong and his friends.

Playing the tujeon cards is a theme used in several period drama series. Among them:

- The fight between Kim Gong-ryang and Prince Gwanghae in Ep. 08 of The King's Face.
