= Koi-Koi =

Japanese card game

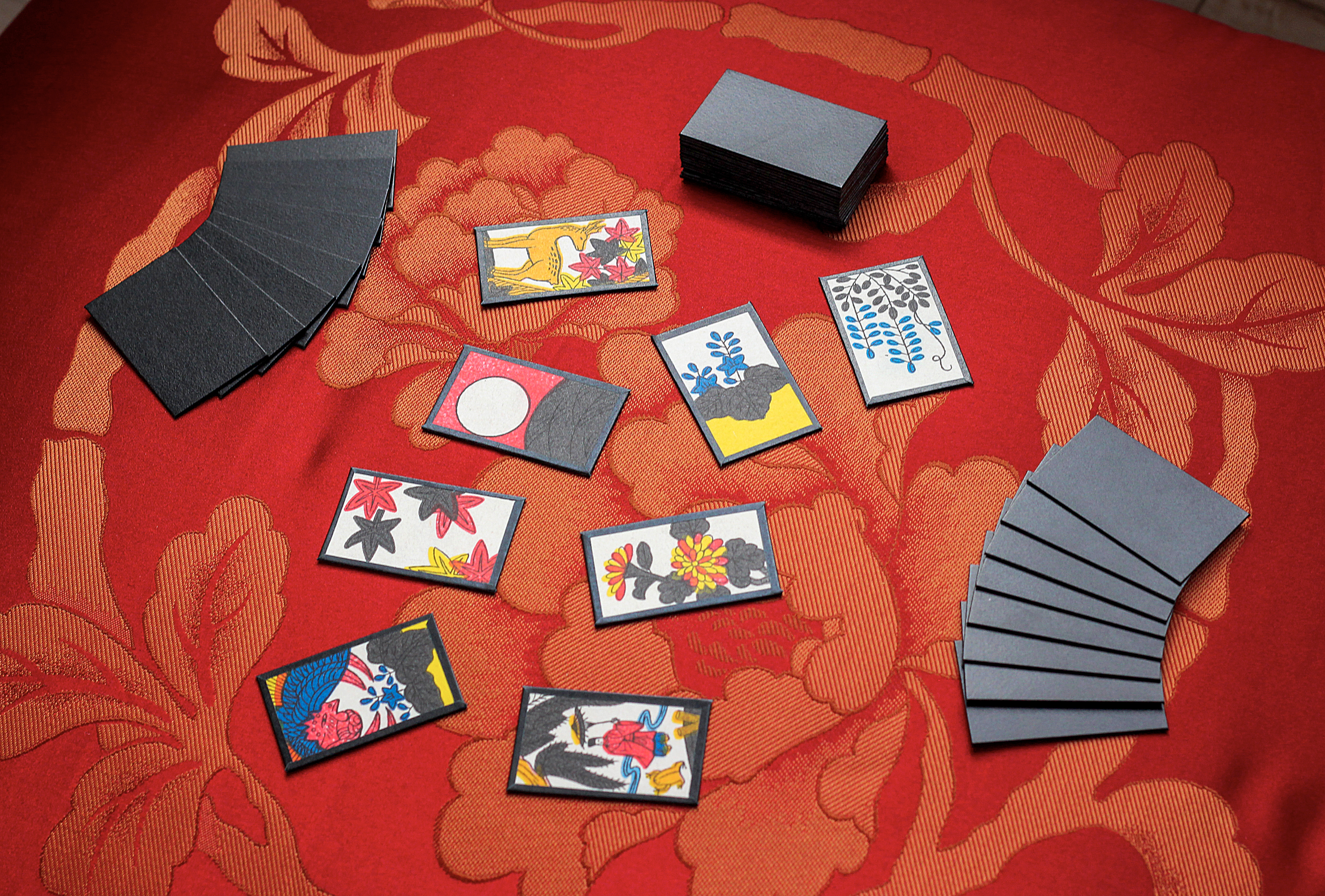
A typical setup with hanafuda for playing Koi-Koi.

Koi-Koi (or Hanafuda Koi Koi) (Japanese: こいこい) is a popular card game in Japan played with hanafuda. The phrase "koi-koi" means "come on" in Japanese which is said when the player wants to continue the round.

The object of the game is to form special card combinations (or sets) called yaku (Japanese: 役) from cards accumulated in a point pile. Players can gain cards in their point piles by matching cards in their hands, or drawn from the draw pile, with cards on the table. Once a yaku has been made, a player can stop to cash in points, or keep going (referred to as "koi-koi", hence the name of the game) to form additional yaku for more points. The point values assigned to individual cards have no effect on the score, but they are helpful to judge their value in forming yaku.

== Deal ==
An initial dealer called the oya (Japanese: 親 "parent") is decided upon when the game starts. This can be done with any method the players agree upon (e.g. rock-paper-scissors, dice roll). A hanafuda-specific method involves drawing a random card: each player draws a single card — the player who draws a card from the earliest month is the oya. If both players draw a card from the same month, the player with the higher value card becomes the oya. The other player is called the ko (Japanese: 子 "child").

To deal, the oya deals eight cards to the ko (face down), then to the table (face up), and then to themselves (face down), though this is normally done with two or four cards at a time. The rest of the cards are set aside as a draw pile, and then the game begins starting with the oya.

== Play ==
On a player's turn, they may match by suit (that is, by month/flower) of any one card in their hand with one on the table and take both into their point pile. If they cannot match a card from their hand, they must discard a card face up to the table. After matching or discarding a card, they then draw one card from the draw pile and place it face up on the playing area. If this card matches any card now on the table, they must match that card and take both for their point pile; otherwise, it becomes part of the table. If the played card matches two cards on the table, the player gets the choice as to which card to match and therefore keep in addition to the played card. In the event that three cards of a same suit are on the table and a player plays the fourth one, they collect all cards of that suit and take them into their point pile.

After a player's turn ends, if they made at least one yaku that turn, that player must then make a choice. They may end the hand and add the value of their yaku to their point total, or they can choose to continue playing (calling koi-koi) in an effort to gain more points. In some versions, a player may only call koi-koi once per hand; in others, a player may call koi-koi on multiple yaku-forming turns. Calling koi-koi leaves the player vulnerable, because if their opponent is able to form a yaku before the caller forms another, the opponent gains double their score and the caller earns nothing. If a player has yaku totaling 7 or more points when the hand ends, that player earns twice that value. If a player hits 7 or more points and their opponent had called koi-koi, they get both doubling bonuses for a total of four times their score.

The player who won the last hand becomes the new oya, and a new hand is dealt. Should both players ever run out of cards to play without having formed a yaku on the last play, the oya gains one point, and the next hand begins with the same oya (this is called Oya-Ken, meaning "Dealer's Privilege"). Generally, play continues for 12 hands, with each hand representing a month in the year, but the players can decide to play for a different number of rounds before the game starts.

Some groups, when gambling, will require the player whose score was multiplied to pay a proportionately larger amount of the winnings (i.e. a player who continued play twice would pay twice as much as the other player, since their score would have been doubled).

=== Special cards ===
The Sake Cup card is unique in that, though technically classified as a 10-point card, it counts as both a 10-point card and a 1-point card at the same time. Some rules allow the Sake Cup to count as a 10-point card and two 1-point cards at the same time.

=== Yaku listing ===
If certain combinations of cards are won during play, extra points apply. Sometimes, players will be paired across the table when this rule is used (in multiplayer Koi-Koi) to increase the chance of getting combos. Below is a list of special combinations with examples and their respective point values. Different rulesets give different point values, and some do not include the tsukimi-zake and hanami-zake yaku.

Some yaku can be considered extensions of others. For example, one may qualify for both Akatan and Tanzaku by having the Akatan combination as well as two additional five-point cards. In these cases, players are awarded points for both Akatan and Tanzaku (unless players decide only the single highest-scoring yaku counts).

Points	Combo Name	Card combo	Example
10	Gokō (五光) "Five Lights"	All five 20-point cards	
8	Shikō (四光) "Four Lights"	All 20-point cards except Ono no Michikaze (Willow's 20-point card)	
7	Ame-Shikō (雨四光) "Rainy Four Lights"	Any four 20-point cards, one of which is Ono no Michikaze (Willow's 20-point card)	
5	Sankō (三光) "Three Lights"	Any three 20-point cards excluding Ono no Michikaze (Willow's 20-point card)	
5	Tsukimi-zake (月見酒) "Moon Viewing"	Moon and Sake Cup (Susuki's 20-point card and Chrysanthemum's 10-point card). Cumulative with Hanami-zake.	
5	Hanami-zake (花見酒) "Cherry Blossom Viewing"	Curtain and Sake Cup (Sakura's 20-point card and Chrysanthemum's 10-point card). Cumulative with Tsukimi-zake.	
5	Inoshikachō (猪鹿蝶) "Boar, Deer, Butterflies"	Boar, Deer, and Butterflies (the 10-point cards from Bush Clover, Maple, and Peony, respectively)	
1	Tane (タネ)	Any five 10-point cards, i.e. any combination of animal cards, Eight-plank bridge (Iris), and Sake Cup (Chrysanthemum). One additional point is awarded for each additional 10-point card.	
10	Akatan Aotan no Chōfuku (赤短・青短の重複) "Red Poetry and Blue Tanzaku Combination"	All three Red Poetry Tanzaku cards and all three Blue Tanzaku cards (i.e. the combination of Aka-tan and Ao-tan)	
5	Akatan (赤短) "Red Poetry Tanzaku"	All three Red Poetry Tanzaku cards (the 5-point cards from Pine, Ume, and Sakura)	
5	Aotan (青短) "Blue Tanzaku"	All three Blue Tanzaku cards (the 5-point cards from Peony, Chrysanthemum, and Maple)	
1	Tanzaku (短冊) "Poetry Slips"	Any five 5-point cards, all of which are Tanzaku cards. One additional point is awarded for each additional 5-point card.	
1	Kasu (カス)	Any ten 1-point cards, all of which are normal cards, also known as Chaff cards. One additional point is awarded for each additional 1-point card.	

=== Instant wins and re-deals ===
There are two special yaku such that, if a player is dealt them before play begins, they are immediately awarded points. Play then ends before it starts, and the game continues to the next hand. If either of these combinations is dealt to the table, however, the hand is declared void and a redeal occurs. These two combinations are as follows.

Points	Combo Name	Card Combo
6	Teshi (手四)	Being dealt four cards of the same suit.
6	Kuttsuki (くっつき)	Being dealt four pairs of cards with matching suits.

== In popular culture ==
Nintendo's Clubhouse Games and Clubhouse Games: 51 Worldwide Classics feature Koi-Koi. Other video games which include Koi-Koi include the Yakuza and Sakura Wars franchises.

== See also ==
- Scopa
