= List of Korean traditional festivals =

Korean traditional festivals (Korean: 한국전통축제; Hanja: 韓國傳統祝祭) are the national and local festivals historically celebrated by Koreans.

== Summary ==
Festival	Significance	Events	Date (lunar calendar)	Food
Seollal	Lunar New Year	Sebae (New Year's greetings), Charye (ancestral ceremony), Yunnori (traditional game)	1st day of first month	Tteokguk (rice cake soup), Yakgwa (honey cakes)
Daeboreum	First full moon	Geuybulnori (rice field burning), Daljip Taeugi (bonfire), Aengmagi Taeugi (talisman burning)	15th day of first month	Ogokbap (five-grain rice), yaksik (glutinous rice), bureom (nuts), Gwibalgisul (alcoholic beverage)
Meoseumnal	Festival for servants	Singing, Dancing, Coming-of-age ceremony	1st day of second month	Songpyeon (Traditional rice cake made with the grains)
Yeongdeungje	Celebrating the god of wind	Jesa (Traditional ritual to appease the god of wind)	First day of second month	Food for jesa
Samjinnal	Celebrating the coming of spring	Archery, Cockfighting, Fortune telling	3rd day of third month	Hwajeon (rice pancakes), Dugyeonju (azalea wine)
Hansik	Start of farming season	Visit to ancestral grave for offering rite, and cleaning and maintenance.	105 days after Dongji (Winter solstice)	Cold food only: ssuktteok (mugwort rice cake), ssukdanja (mugwort dumplings), ssuktang (mugwort soup)
Chopail	Buddha's birthday	Lantern festival, hanging lanterns up and visiting the temple	8th day of fourth month	Different types of tteok, dumplings, fish dishes
Dano	Celebration of spring and farming	Washing hair with changpo, ssireum (wrestling), swing, giving fans as gifts	5th day of fifth month	Variety of tteok, herb rice cakes
Yudu	Water greeting	Bathing and washing hair to get rid of bad luck (if any)	15th day of sixth month	Noodles
Sambok	Hottest day of the summer	Hot dishes. Cold baths are believed to make people weak.	Between sixth and seventh month	Samgyetang (Chicken soup)
Chilseok	Meeting day of Gyeonwu and Jiknyeo in Korean folk tale	Fabric weaving	7th day of seventh month	Miljeonbyeon (Wheat pancake), Milguksu (Wheat noodles)
Baekjung	Time with hundred of fruits' and vegetables' seeds	Resting, performing rituals	15th day of seventh month	Food made of potato, flour, and wheat along with a variety of wild vegetables
Chuseok	Harvest festival	Charye, ssireum, visiting ancestor graves	15th day of eighth month	Songpyeon, torantang (taro soup)
Jungu	Double Ninth Festival	Danpung-nori (Viewing the changing color of maples during autumn)	9th day of ninth month	Gukhwajeon (Chrysanthemum pancake), eoran (Roe), yuja tea
Sangdalgosa	Ritual performed to the House gods	Performing a ritual to the house gods, coiling a golden rope around the House, spreading a layer of red clay on the floor	Tenth month	Various tteok
Sondolpoong	Ritual performed to appease the wind	Usually boatmen and fishermen perform jesa for Sondol	20th day of tenth month	Regular food for jesa
Dongji	Winter Solstice	Rites to dispel bad spirits	11th month	Patjuk (red bean soup)
Seotdal Geumeum	New Year's Eve	Cleaning up the house, Preparing for Seollal	Last day of the year	Food for the next day, Seollal

== Detailed description by lunar month ==
=== First ===
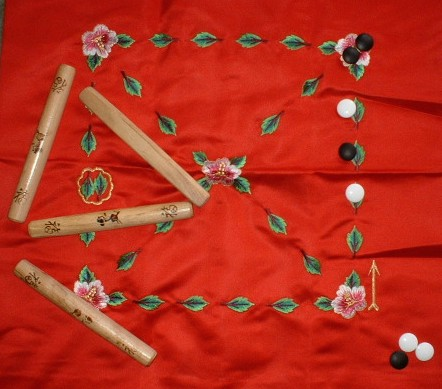
Yunnori, traditional Korean game on Seollal

- Seollal (New Years Day)

Seollal is one of the most significant holidays in Korea, along with Chuseok. Seollal is New Year’s Day on the Korean lunar calendar. The name originates from the word seol, which means unfamiliar, implying newness of a new coming year. It is unknown when Koreans began celebrating Seollal, but rituals of the festival are estimated to go back to the 6th century. On Seollal, Koreans demonstrate their respect to parents and elders in the family, as well as deceased ancestors through Sebae and Charye. Also, elders give money or present to a person who did Sebae in return of showing their respect. Koreans almost always wear hanbok on this day and eat Tteokguk and Yakwa in addition to playing a traditional game like. With passing of Seollal, all Koreans age one year under the East Asian age reckoning.

- Daeboreum (15th day)

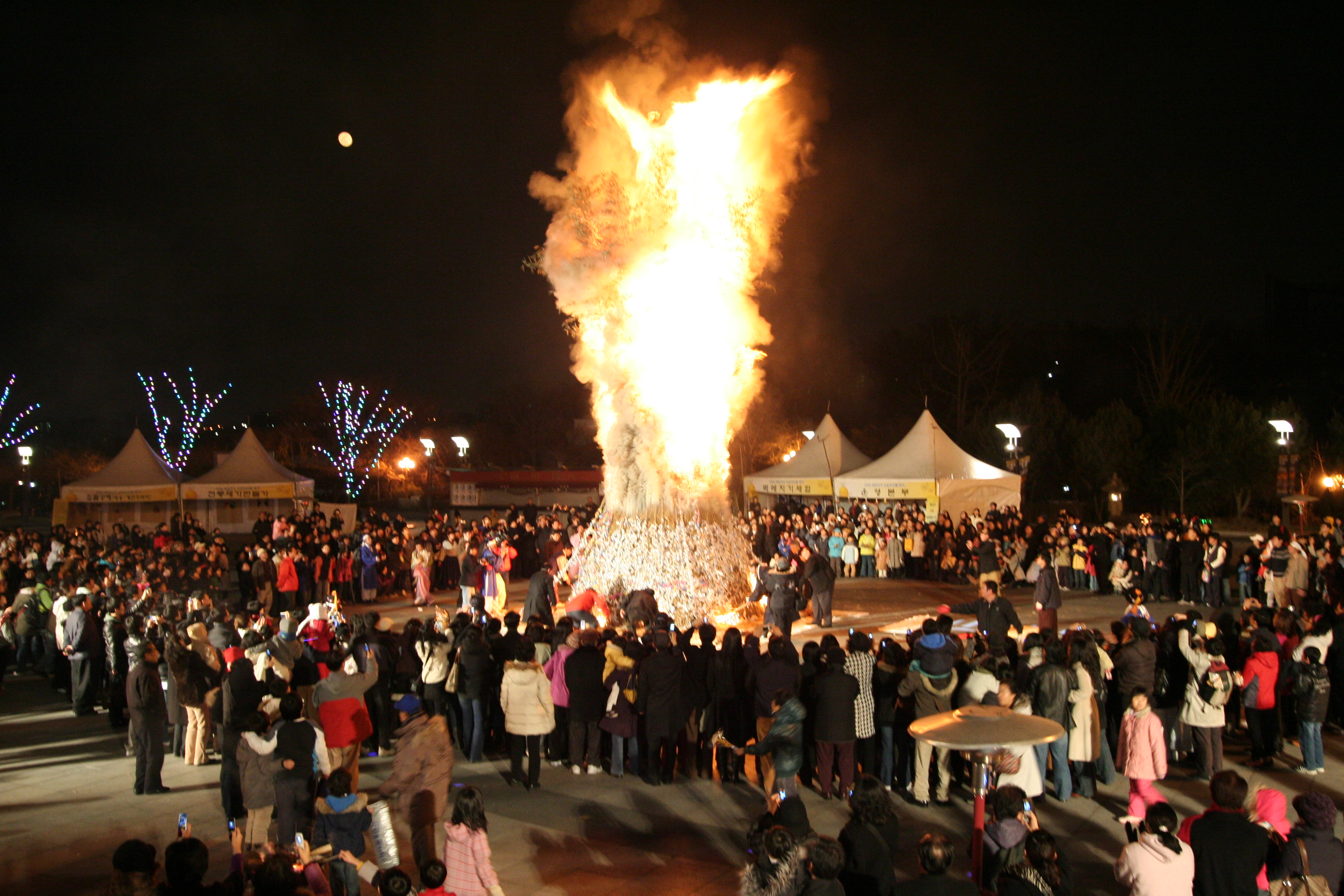
Daeboreum Festival

Daeboreum celebrates the first full moon of the new year. Traditionally, group of people play a traditional game called Geuybulnori (Hangul: 쥐불놀이) a night before or on the day of Daeboreum. Farmers burn hays of dry grass on ridges between the rice fields while other people whirl around few cans with a lot of holes which allowed charcoals to fire inside the cans. Practically, people believed the fire could help kill harmful insects near the rice fields, and ashes of the fire could fertilize the ground to help the year's farming. Also, charcoals were used to blaze a fire. In addition, people eat ogokbap (Hangul: 오곡밥, Hanja: 五穀밥), or ‘five-grain rice,’ and seasoned greens. People drink ear-quickening wine (Hangul: 귀밝이술), go up to the mountain in the night (Hangul: 달맞이) and pray for his or her wishes to the moon. People also do Bureom (Hangul: 부럼깨기) on Daeboreum. People crack nuts with one's teeth, believing this will not make one's face come out in spots for the rest of the year.

=== Second ===
- Meoseumnal (2nd month)

Meoseumnal is a traditional festival for servants. Meoseum (머슴) refers to servants and slaves. This was a day that masters allowed their servants and slaves to celebrate a day with extra food, singing, and dancing before farming started in February, back in the day when slaves existed in Korea. The masters also provided enough money for the servants so that the servants would have not needed to spend their money in the day. This festival was designed by masters to encourage their servants and slaves to work better on the year's farming. The servants usually made traditional snack called songpyeon with the grains used during Daeboreum and ate them according to their age, because they believed this could bring them good luck. For instance, a 10-year-old servant would eat ten Songpyeon. In Euiryong-gun, Yangsan-gun, or Gyungsangnam-do, the day was regarded as a coming-of-age day. The festival is no longer celebrated after the abolition of the Meoseum system in Korea, and it is even rare to see a person remembering the festival.

- Yongdeungje

Yongdeungje (Hangul: 영등제, Hanja: 靈登祭) is a day to celebrate Yongdeung (Hangul: 영등, Hanja: 靈登, the god of wind), believed to have descended to Earth on the first day of February and ascended on the 20th. The festival is mostly celebrated in Jeju Island and Youngnam district. While Yongdeung is on Earth, it is believed to bring strong winds. Thus, people in the sectors strongly affected by wind such as fisheries and farms perform an ancestral ritual Jesa (Hangul: 제사, Hanja: 祭祀) in order to appease the wind god. If it rains or is cloudy the day Yongdeung ascended, people think the year will be a fruitful one.

=== Third ===
- Samjinnal (3rd day)

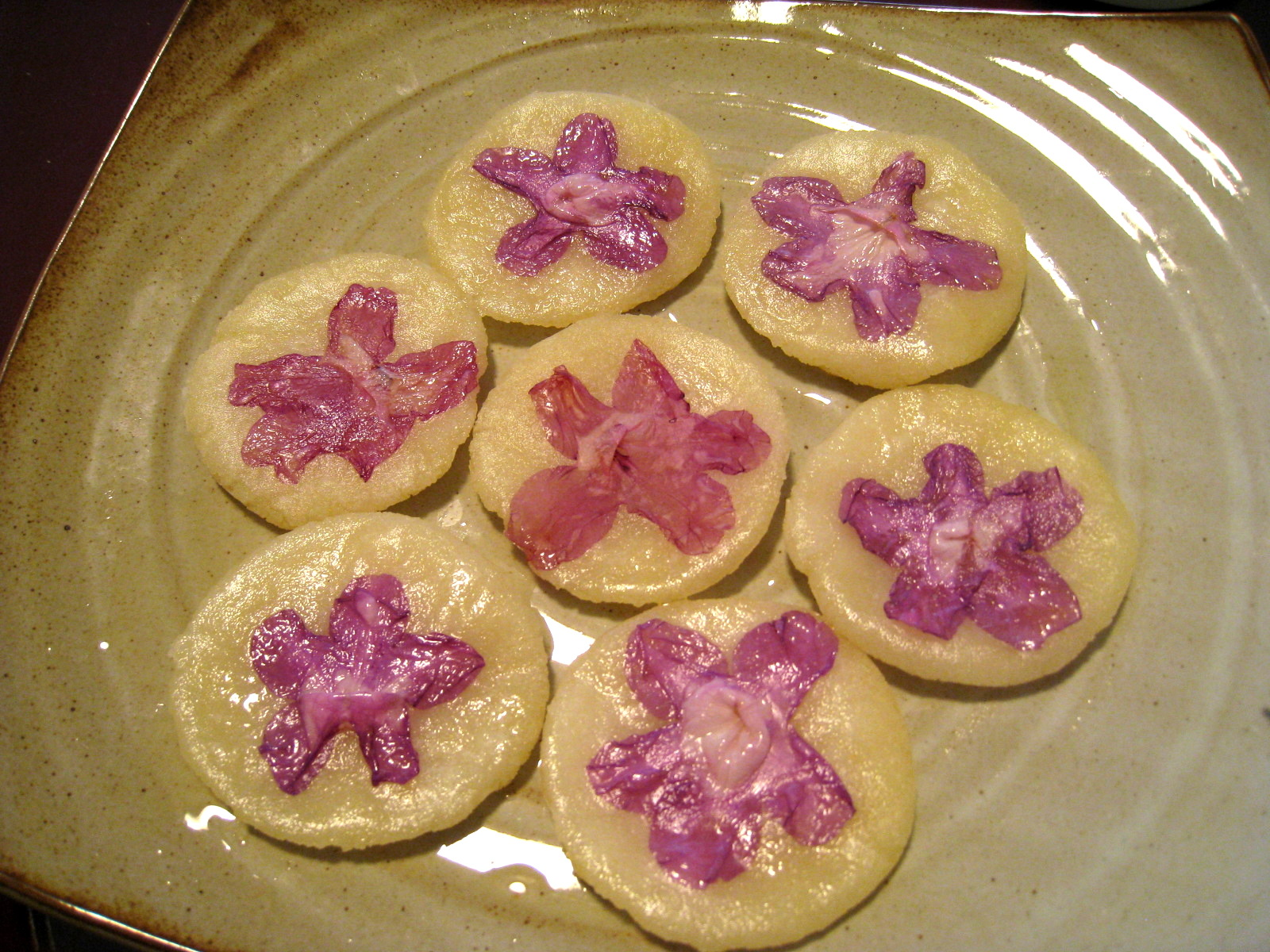
Jindallae (Azalea) Hwajeon

Samjinnal (Hangul: 삼짇날, Hanja: 三짇날)’s origin is unknown but is noted as a day of celebrating the coming of spring. Thus Samjinnal, the date with two 3s, is considered a lucky day with good and evil spirits. This is the day when barn swallows return, snakes wake from their sleep, and butterflies begin to fly. It is thought as good luck if one sees a snake on this day. Archery, cockfighting, flower viewing, and fortune telling are also enjoyed by the people celebrating this day. People would eat rice pancakes with flower toppings known as Hwajeon (Hangul: 화전, Hanja: 花煎) and noodles, and drink Dugyeonju (Hangul: 두견주, Hanja: 杜鵑酒, Azalea wine).

=== Fourth ===
- Hansik (105 days after winter solstice)

One of the biggest four traditional festivals along with Seollal, Dano, and Chuseok, Hansik marks the start of the farming season. During the festival, Koreans visit their ancestral graves for offering rite and cleaning and maintenance. Jesa (Hangul: 제사, Hanja: 祭祀), a traditional ritual is performed with the expectation of a fruitful year at the grave. Traditional food is prepared for the Jesa and shared with families and neighbors after the ritual has been performed. It is known that on Hansik, people should eat only cold food, but the ideal is generally ignored. Ssuktteok (Hangul: 쑥떡, a variation of Tteok, mugwort cake), Ssukdanja (Hangul: 쑥단자, Hanja: 쑥團餈, mugwort dumplings), and Ssuktang (Hangul: 쑥탕, Hanja: 쑥湯, mugwort soup) are the representative food for Hansik.

- Chopail (8th day)

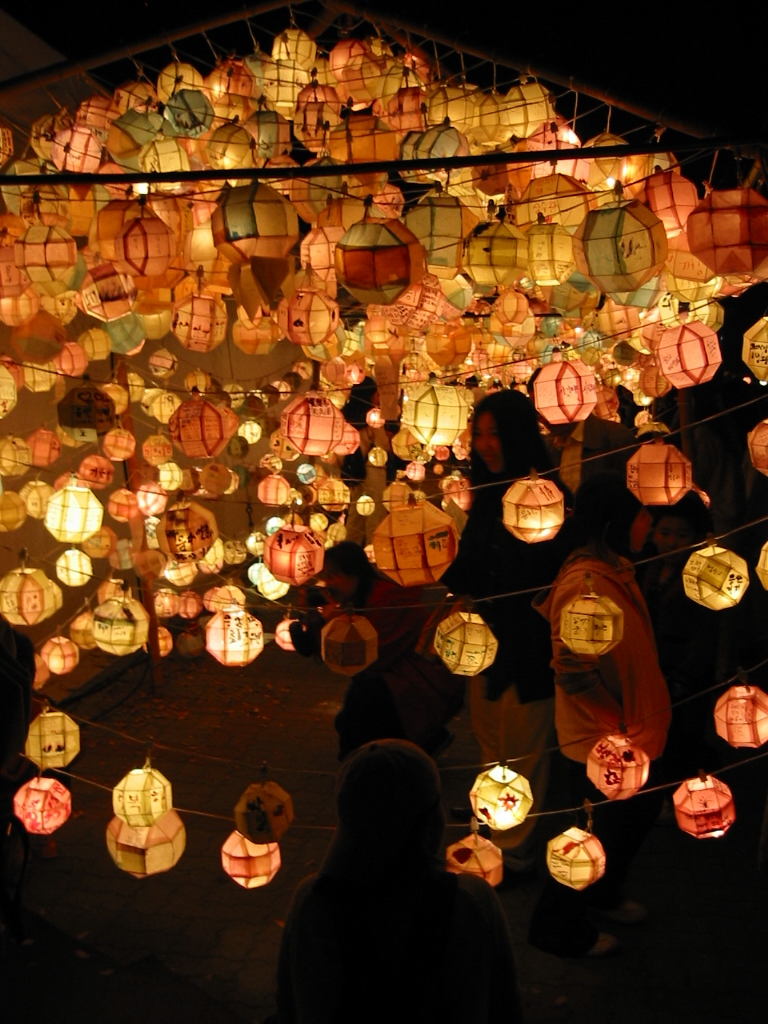
Lotus Lanterns Festival on Chopail

Also known as Buddha’s Birthday, people celebrate the founder of Buddhism. The main event of this day is merrymaking with lantern parades. Before this event, families build lanterns in accordance to the number of their family members. On the celebration day, people light the lamps and hang them outside their homes. These lanterns are made in shapes of flowers, fishes, turtles, fruits, and many others. People also enjoy eating different types of Tteok, dumplings, and special dishes made of fish.

=== Fifth ===
- Dano (5th day)

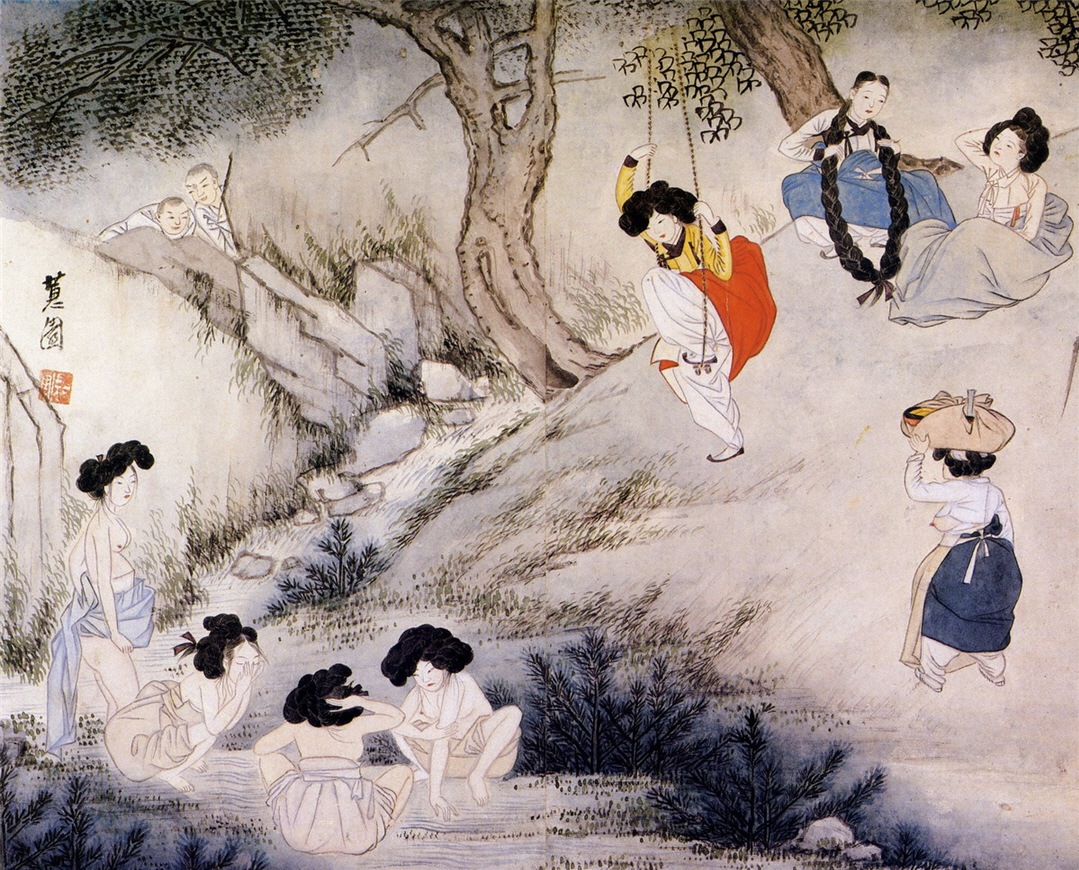
Dano painted by Hyewon Shin Yun-bok

Dano is a traditional festival in celebration of spring and farming. On this day, women wash their hair in water boiled with sweet flag (known as Changpo (Hangul: 창포, Hanja: 菖蒲) in Korea) and men wear iris roots around their waists to ward off evil spirits. Main activities include folk games such as Ssireum (Hangul: 씨름, Korean wrestling match) and swing. Also, as it is a time when the summer comes, people present a fan to friends or neighbors wishing that they can beat the heat that summer. On Dano, People eat traditional foods including a variety of Tteok and other herb rice cakes.
UNESCO designated the "Gangneung Dano-je Festival (Hangul: 강릉단오제, Hanja: 江陵端午祭)" as a "Masterpiece of the Oral and Intangible Heritage of Humanity."

=== Sixth ===
- Yudu

Yudu is a traditional festival celebrated in the hopes of getting rid of ghosts and bad spirits. On Yudu, people would go to creeks that run to the East and bathe and wash their hair in the past. It is considered a performance and ritual of washing away bad spirits. Then people would perform rituals to the farming god with newly harvested fruits hoping for a fruitful harvest. People also eat noodles as it is believed that by eating noodles, people will live a prosperous and long life.

- Sambok (between 6th and 7th month)

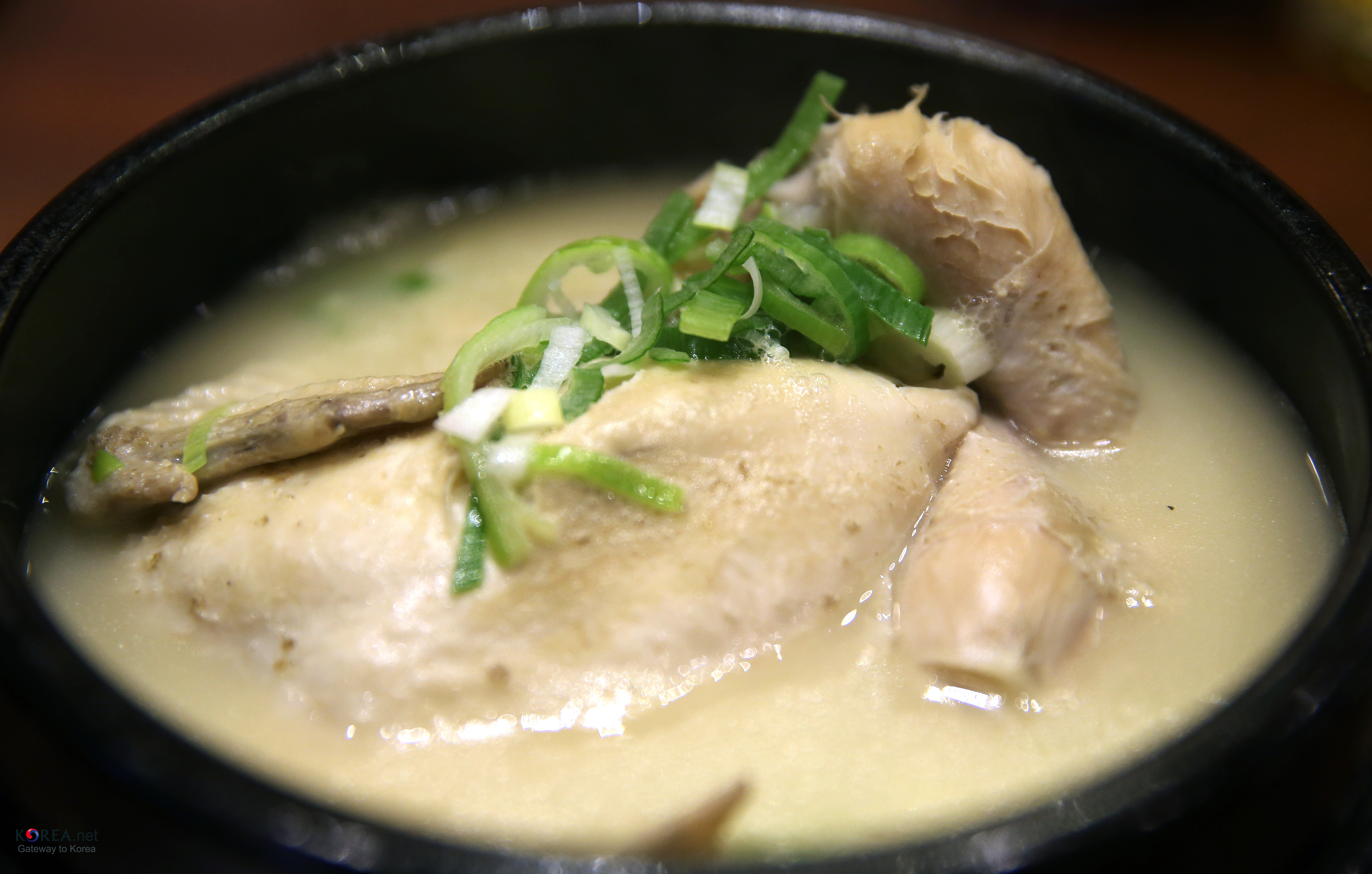
Samgyetang, Chicken soup on Sambok

Sambok is thought to be the hottest day of the summer. Bok in Sambok means that a person is lying down like a dog, and the hot energy of summer is strong, so the energy of autumn cannot stand up and obey. In order to get through the hottest day of the year, people eat fresh fruits, liquor, and other traditional foods. The most popular dish on Sambok is Samgyetang (Hangul: 삼계탕, Hanja: 蔘鷄湯) made with a whole young chicken and Insam (Hangul: 인삼, Hanja: 人蔘, Korean ginseng). There is a myth in that if one bathes in a river or lake on Sambok, he or she will grow weak.

=== Seventh ===
- Chilseok (7th day)

Chilseok is related to weaving activities of Korean women. On this day, women perform a ritual to Jingnyeo with cucumbers and pickled fruits to weave better. On Chilseok, people ate miljeonbyeon (Hangul: 밀전병, Hanja: 밀煎餠, Wheat pancake), and mil guksu (Hangul: 밀국수, Wheat noodles) because the wheat is not the right food when the cold wind blows.

- Baekjung

Mid July is a time when there is an abundant number of fruit and vegetable seeds; thus the festival, Baekjung (Hangul: 백중, Hanja: 百中/百衆) derives from the word "Baek" (Hangul: 백, Hanja: 百, hundred) implying there are a hundred fruit and vegetable seeds. Before harvest, farmers take this day to rest and perform rituals to farming gods hoping for a fruitful harvest season. In the past, servants and workers were granted with a day off and received allowance money to buy goods and food and some servants were also married on this day. On Baekjung, people eat food made with potatoes, flour, and wheat, along with a variety of wild vegetables.

=== Eighth ===
- Chuseok

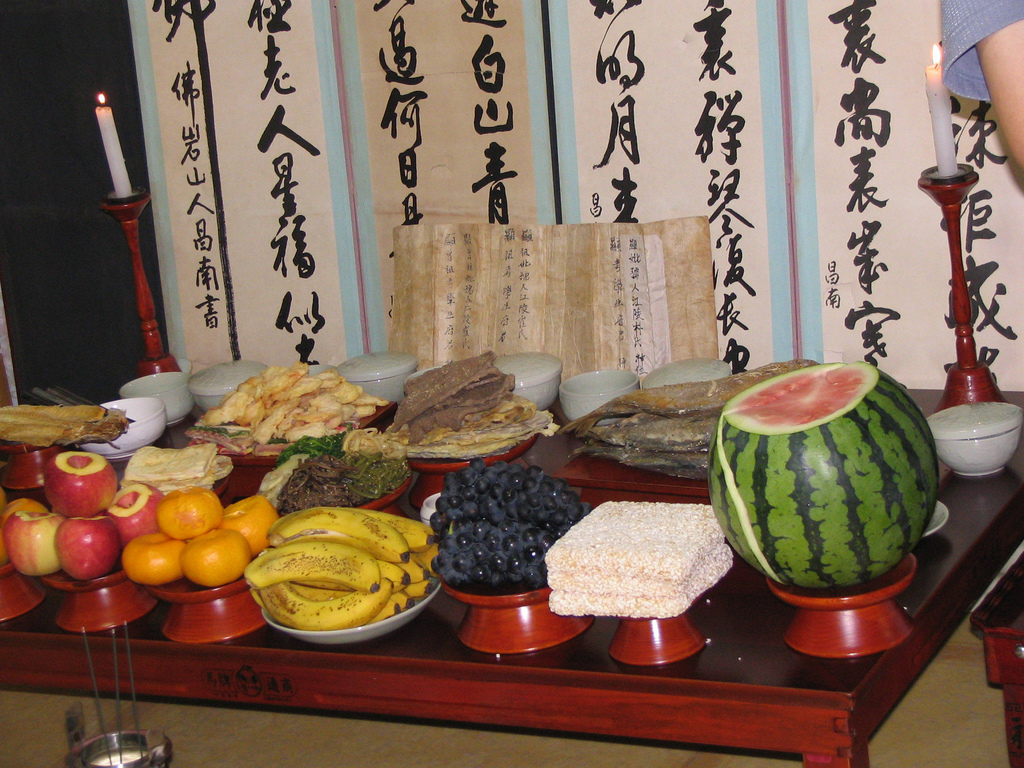
Charye table setting on Chuseok

Also known as Hangawi (Hangul: 한가위), the Korean thanksgiving Chuseok (Hangul: 추석, Hanja: 秋夕) is one of the greatest traditional festivals. On Chuseok, which takes place on the 15th day of the 8th lunar month under a full moon, people enjoy traditional games such as dancing, tug-of-war, and Ssireum (Hangul: 씨름, Korean wrestling match). People also perform traditional rituals such as Charye (Hangul: 차례, Hanja: 茶禮) in respect and remembrance of their ancestors. As part of the ritual, people take care of the ancestral grave sites by mowing the grass and cutting off weeds. People enjoy a variety of traditional foods and dishes like Songpyeon (Hangul: 송편, Hanja: 松편, Traditional rice cake made with the grains), Torantang (Hangul: 토란탕, Taro soup) and liquor made of newly harvested fruits and vegetables. It is one of the most richest and festive festivals of the year.

=== Ninth ===
- Jungu or Jungyangjeol (9th day)

Based on ancient Korean numerology called "jungyang", literally meaning the square of a positive number. Hence, Jungu (Hangul: 중구, Hanja 重九) or Jungyangjeol (Hangul: 중양절, Hanja: 重陽節), the date in which two 9s is considered a lucky day. The festival dates back to the Silla Dynasty (Hangul: 신라, Hanja: 新羅, BC57 ~ AD935). During the Joseon Dynasty (Hangul: 조선, Hanja: 朝鮮, 1392 ~ 1897), Koreans climbed Namsan or Bookaksan in Hanyang (Hangul: 한양, Hanja:漢陽, the capital of Joseon Dynasty, now Seoul) and mountains nearby the city, ate and drank and enjoyed Danpung-nori (Hangul: 단풍놀이, Hanja: 丹楓놀이, viewing the changing color of maples during autumn). People usually eat Gukhwajeon (Hangul: 국화전, Hanja: 菊花煎, Chrysanthemum pancake), Eran (Hangul: 어란, Hanja: 魚卵, roe), and Yujacheong (Hangul: 유자청, Hanja: 柚子淸, Honey citron tea).

=== Tenth ===
- Sangdalgosa

Sandalgosa (Hangul: 상달고사, Hanja: 上달告祀) is a ritual performed during the month of October to the house gods for peace and stability of the family. It is also a performance to thank the gods for a prosperous year so it is performed after harvest. Each family picks a good day to perform the ritual and coil a golden rope around the house, spread a layer of red clay on the floor to protect the house from evil spirits. Food is provided to the house gods and it is displayed in each room.

==== Sangdalgosa in different regions ====
In Nocheon-ri, Ungcheon-eup, Boryeong-si, Chungcheongnam-do, the harvest is over and rice cakes are steamed in October to celebrate the rite. This is also called the "family rite". The meaning behind this name is the hope that the family will be at peace and the descendants will be well for 12 months a year. If the family rite is held in September, Jung-guil on September 9 of the lunar calendar is regarded as auspicious day. In addition, during the rite, six piles of red clay are planted on both sides of the gate to prevent unclean people from entering the house. The steamed rice cake prepared at this time is called "House Siru". In case of excessive corruption and impurity, red beans are added to prevent damage. The red beans are not crushed but scattered on the steamer without being put on top. In families that are extremely dedicated to Chilseong, Chilseong Siru is steamed separately. Nowadays there are not many children who like rice cakes, and they do not hold a big rite, so they steam Doenjang-jjigae.

- Sondolpoong or Sonseokpong (20th day)

Sondolpoong (Hangul: 손돌풍, Hanja: 孫乭風) or Sonseokpong (Hangul: 손석풍, Hanja: 孫石風) are strong winds that usually blows on 20 October. There is a folk tale on why the winds come on that day: A boatman named Sondol (Hangul: 손돌, Hanja: 孫乭) was killed under a false accusation. Thus the strong winds and rapid torrents come every year on that day. To remember his unfair death and appease with the soul, boatmen and fishermen perform a ritual on this day. By performing the ritual, people believe strong winds and currents common during the time will not harm them. Regular ritual food is prepared on this day.

=== Eleventh ===
- Dongzhi Festival

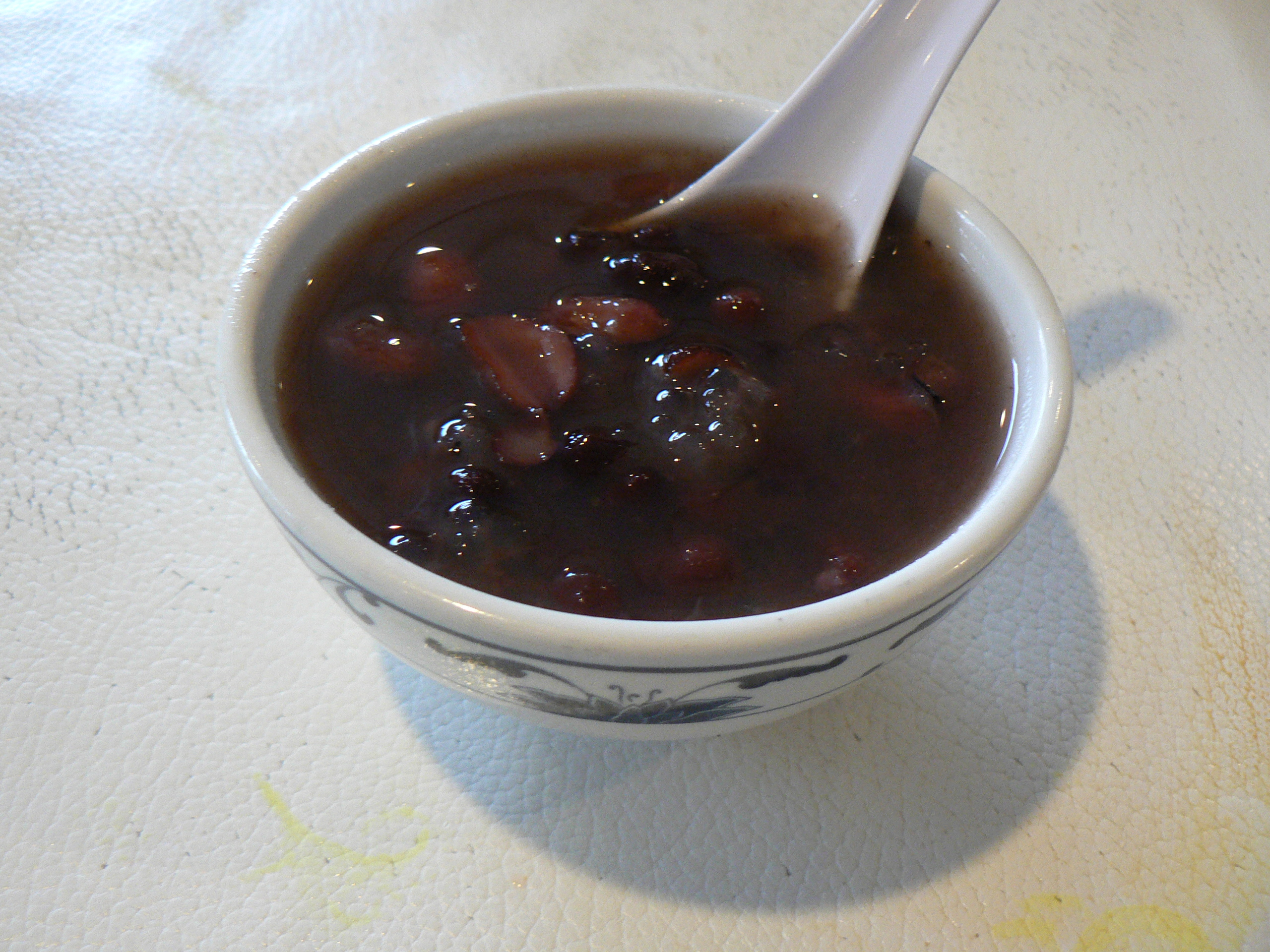
Patjuk, Red bean soup on Dongji

Dongji (Hangul: 동지, Hanja: 冬至) is the day with the longest night and the shortest day. It is also the day when the ecliptic longitude marks 270 degrees. Starting Dongji, the days become longer marking the coming of spring thus it is also known as the real beginning of a new year. People eat porridge made of red beans called Patjuk (Hangul 팥죽, Hanja: 팥粥, Read bean soup) on Dongji. Patjuk is believed to ward off evil spirits.

=== Twelfth ===
- Seotdal Geumeum (Last day of the year)

Seotdal Geumeum (Hangul: 섣달그믐) was established to celebrate the last day of the year by driving evil spirits away and welcoming a new and prosperous year. To drive away evil spirits, in palaces and public offices people wore masks playing drums in the past; because the following day is Seollal (Hangul: 설날), most people start preparing food for the next day, cleaning up the house.

== See also ==
- List of music festivals in South Korea
