= Superstition in Korea =

Superstition in Korea, rooted in Korean shamanism, exists in many parts of Korean life. In Korean shamanic faith, folk beliefs have been passed down through generations. During the Joseon Dynasty, Confucianism and shamanism flourished. Although Confucianism has no god figure, there are supernatural phenomena within the belief system of Korean shamanism.

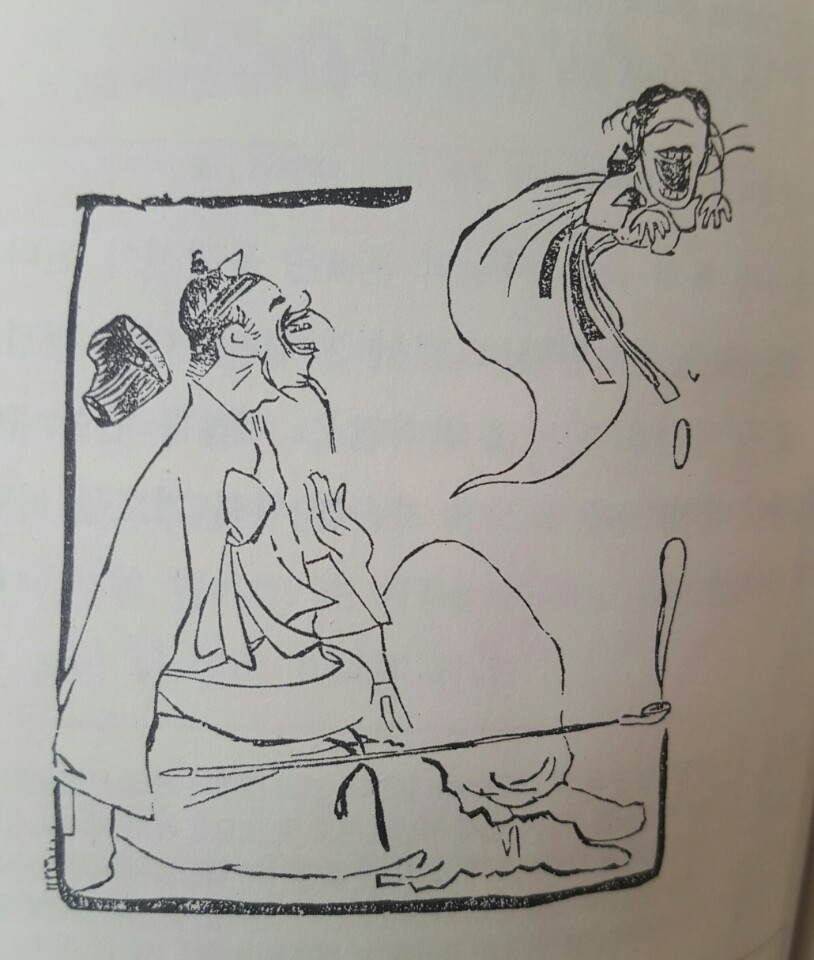
A representative picture of superstition in Korea

== Character ==
Some Korean superstitions are similar to Chinese or Japanese superstitions. Many Korean superstitions are related to being afraid of uncertain situations or avoiding certain actions.

== Examples of Korean superstitions ==
1. Writing names in red is thought to bring bad omens, including failure and death. This shamanistic belief originated in China as red calligraphy was reserved for execution decrees. This shamanistic belief may have spread to Korea while it was a vassal state of China.
2. If someone dreams of pigs, it is a good omen. In Korea, the pig is a symbol of fertility. Moreover, the Chinese pronunciation of "pig" is similar to the pronunciation for jade, so the pig is synonymous with riches. In early Korea, pigs were associated with wealth. Until the 1970s, pigs were so expensive that students could pay their university entrance fees by selling one.
3. The number 4 is a symbol of bad luck. In elevators, the letter F indicates the fourth floor instead of the number 4. The pronunciation of the number 4 sounds similar to the word '死' which means death in Chinese characters. In China and Japan, the number 4 is also associated with misfortune or death.
4. The magpie is thought to bring good luck and is viewed as a positive figure.
5. It is said that it is auspicious to go outside at the dawn of New Year's Day and hear the sound of a magpie, and it is ominous to hear the sound of a crow.
6. Sleeping with the fan turned on is incorrectly believed to possibly cause death. Some Koreans believe that it can cause lack of oxygen and hypothermia during sleep.
7. If someone is presented with shoes for a gift, some Koreans believe this is a sign that one's significant other will desert them.
8. If people shake their legs, they can lose their good luck, i.e. they may have lost future opportunities.
9. Setting foot on a threshold can bring misfortune. This superstition originates from the time of the Mongol invasions of Korea. In Korean culture, it is preferable for one to die at home and for the body to remain in the home for some time. Leaving the house in a coffin was a means to dispose of the lingering attachment to the world, with the threshold of the front door thought to be a boundary between this world and the afterlife. Therefore, for a living person to step on the threshold of a door is considered a sign of bad luck.
10. It is bad luck to cut one's nails or toenails at night.
11. It is thought that if one eats sea mustard soup on the day of an exam, one will fail the test. Sea mustard is slippery, so it is thought that one will "fall down" and fail. On the other hand, if a person eats sticky rice cake or Korean hard taffy, he or she will pass the exam. Rice cakes and Korean hard taffy are sticky, so it is thought to help the person "stick" instead of slip, and thus pass the test.
12. Surgery to treat malnutrition (Jara ddagi). This form of alternative medicine based on superstition involves a surgical procedure where hands are intentionally scarred to "pull" negative energy out of a body. In the past, South Korean children suffered from malnutrition. Many thought malnutrition was a result of the body's negative energy residue rather than a lack of food. As a result, this surgery became popular and was believed to treat malnutrition. From a scientific perspective, this form of surgery cannot be considered to be successful in treating malnutrition.
13. Being blessed by a shaman. In this ancestral rite, the shaman can pray or sing or dance for the future.
14. Theory of divination based on topography. Feng shui is used to orient a house site or a grave site and is often regarded as a superstitious belief. Feng shui derives from ideas about geomancy originating from China. Practitioners present feng shui as traditional knowledge that has been proven from experience, insisting it can be helpful when evaluating the energy of sites; however, there is no scientific evidence to suggest feng shui achieves what it claims to do. Practitioners admit that feng shui is not superior to modern knowledge, but point out that it presents an alternative to problems that they believe cannot be resolved by modern science.

== Related Korean films ==
The following movies deal with Korean superstitions:

1. Whispering Corridors
2. The Wailing
3. The Face Reader
4. The Piper
5. The Priests
6. Exhuma

== Controversy ==
In modern society, relying on superstitions has declined as there is more of an emphasis on rationality. As a result, many people are critical of acting on superstitious beliefs. Blindly turning to superstition, however, can still comfort the mind.

There is an ongoing debate on whether ancestral rites (Jesa) or jwibulnori, which are famous Korean traditional plays, are viewed as mere superstitions or as an important aspect of the country's culture.
