= First Full Moon Festival =

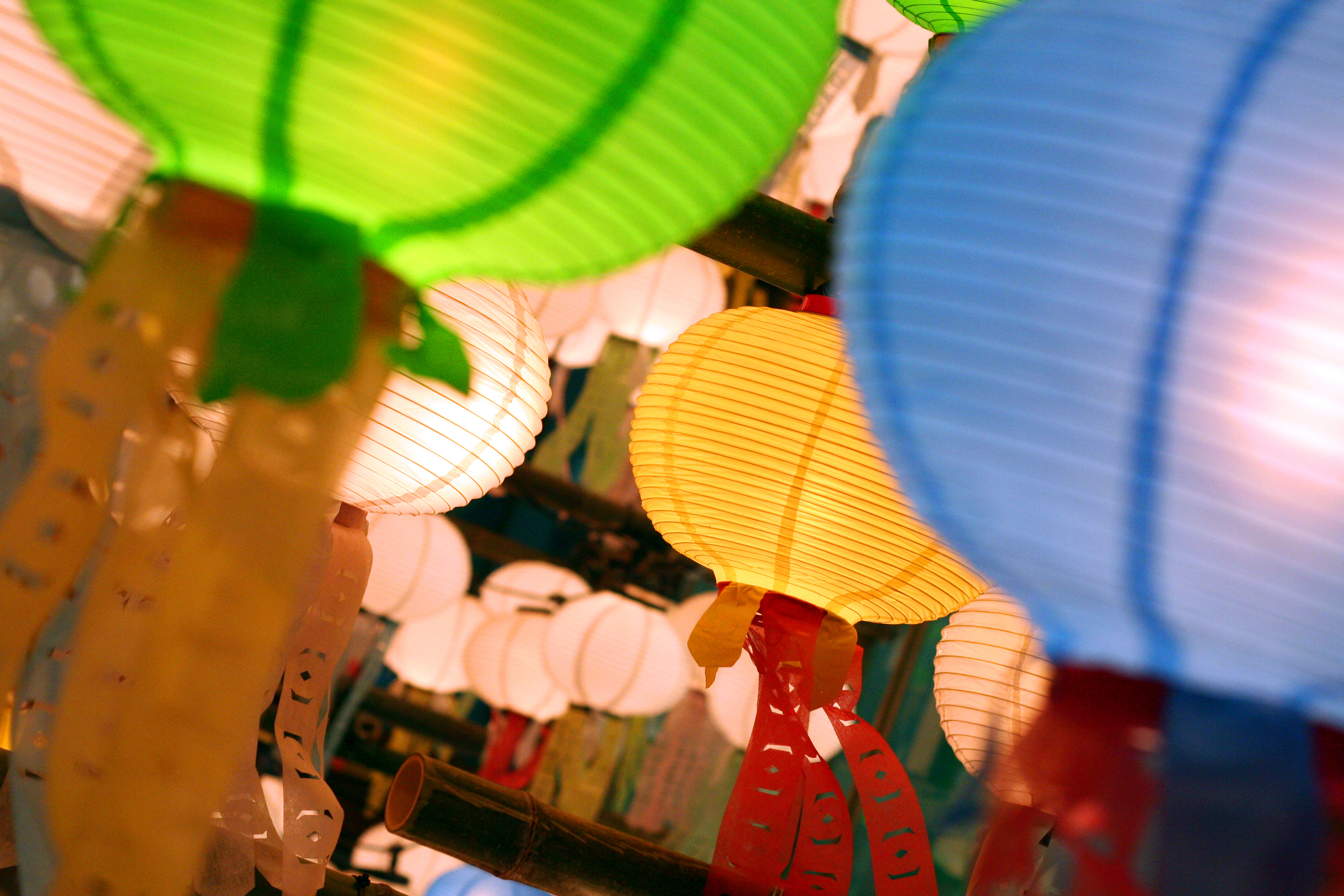
Lanterns in Korea

Lantern Festival may refer to five related festivals in the East Asian cultural sphere:

- Yuanxiao in China
- Daeboreum in Korea
- Koshōgatsu in Japan
- Tết Nguyên Tiêu in Vietnam
- Paper Lantern Lighting Ceremony in Myanmar
