= Five grains (disambiguation) =

Five grains may refer to:

- Five Grains, or granular foods (Wu gu) of Chinese and related culture
- Five grains as the five species of grain that have a special status in Judaism

== See also ==
- Five-grain rice, Korean dish
- Wuliangye, Chinese baijiu distillery whose name is literally translated as "Five Grain Liquid"
