= Sambe =

Fiber derived from Cannabis sativa

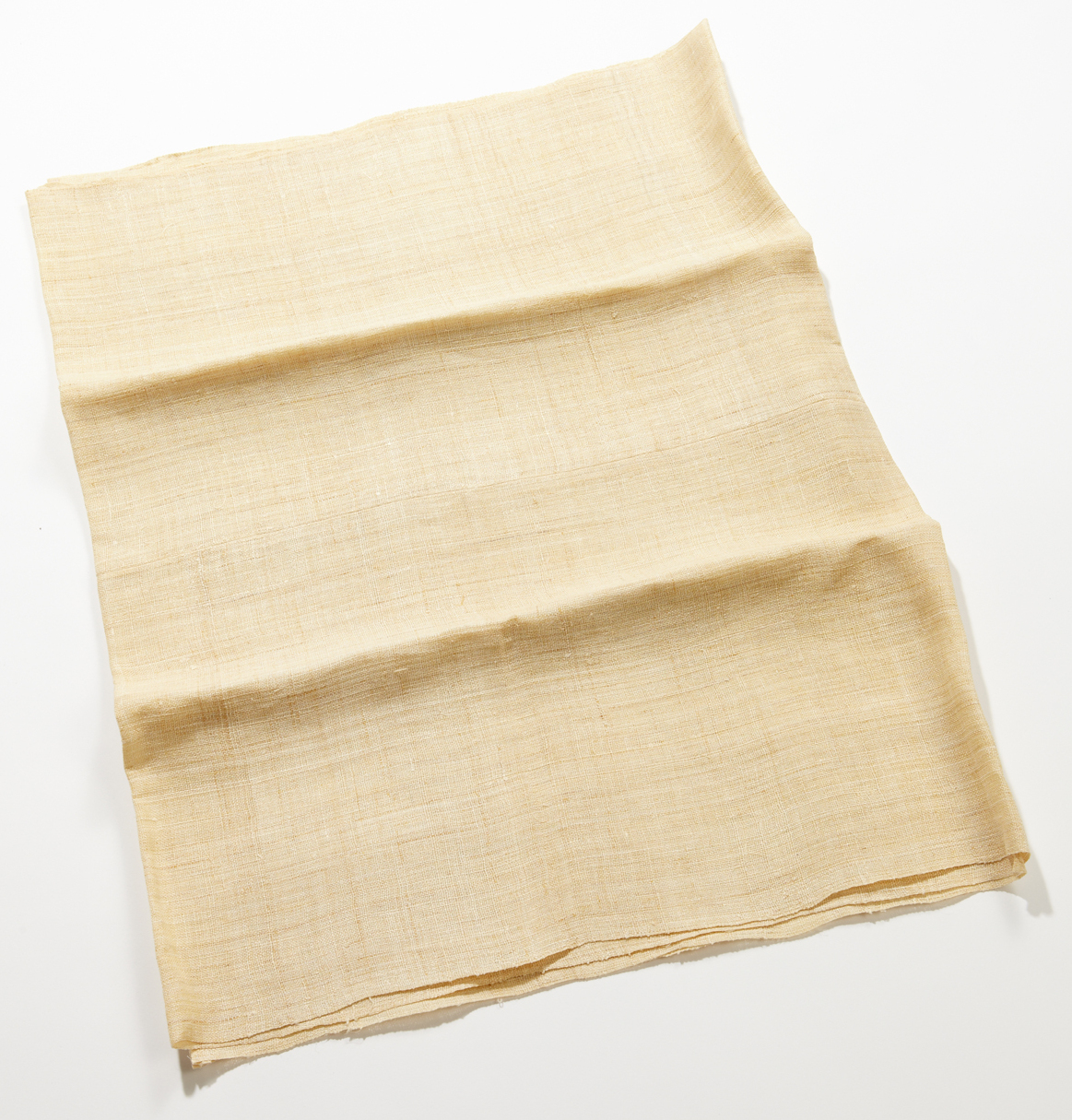
Sample of sambe

Sambe (Korean: 삼베), or hemp fiber, is a traditional fiber for Korean clothing. An increasingly rare practice, it has been made a national treasure, and specific individuals with the ability were designated intangible cultural assets. Sambe was the primary textile fiber used in clothing for commoners/sangmin prior to the introduction of cotton to Korea in the late 15th century. A particularly fine variety is andongpo from Andong, North Gyeongsang Province.

A Korean traditional funeral includes a sambe death dress for the deceased and sambe clothing for mourners. After commercial relations between China and Korea resumed in 1990, Chinese-made hemp cloth began to replace Korean cloth.
