= Paper Lantern Lighting Ceremony =

Paper Lantern Lighting Ceremony Burmese: မီးကြာလှည့်လည်ပွဲ Pa'o Karen: ပွယ်ꩻလေပ်မေႏဗို
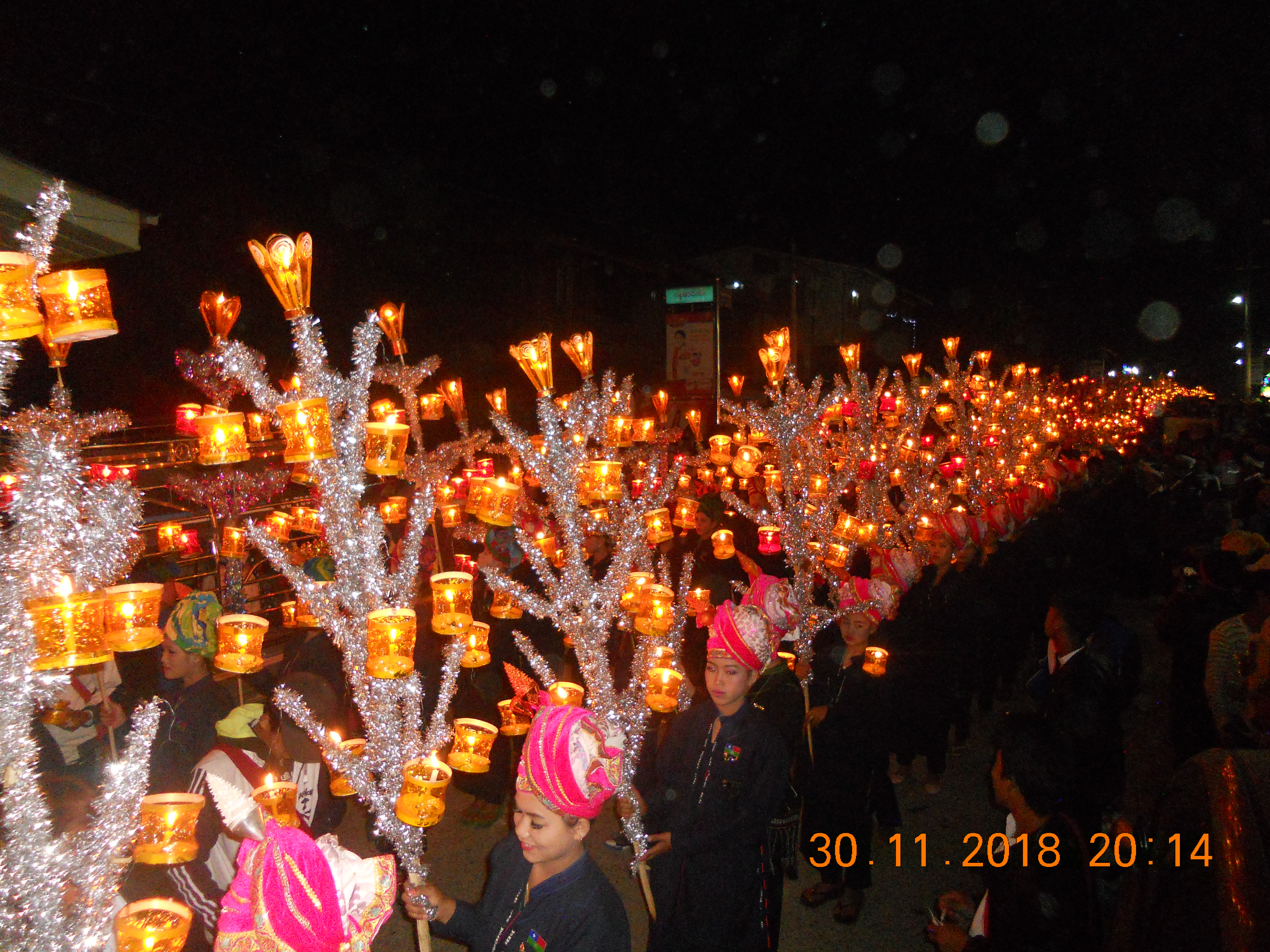
- Paper lanterns lighting ceremony (Pa'o Karen: ပွယ်ꩻလေပ်မေႏဗို) in Hopong
- Official name: မီးထွန်းပွဲတော်
- Observed by: Myanmar
- Type: Cultural, Religious
- Significance: Marks the end of the rainy season
- Observances: Flying of paper lanterns
- Date: Full moon day of Thadingyut
- Related to: Chotrul Duchen (in Tibet); Daeboreum (in Korea); Koshōgatsu (in Japan); Magha Puja (in Thailand, Sri Lanka, Myanmar, Cambodia and Laos); Tết Nguyên Tiêu (in Vietnam)

The Paper Lantern Lighting Ceremony (Burmese: မီးကြာလှည့်လည်ပွဲ) is a traditional festival celebrated alongside the Thadingyut Festival and Tazaungdaing Festival in Myanmar. The ceremony involves walking clockwise around the main building of a monastery or pagoda while carrying illuminated paper lanterns.

The tradition is particularly observed in Southern Shan State, the Pa'O Self-Administered Zone, and other states and regions of Myanmar. It is celebrated on the night of the full moon day during the months of Thadingyut and Tazaungmon in the Burmese calendar, corresponding to October in the Gregorian calendar.

== Tradition ==
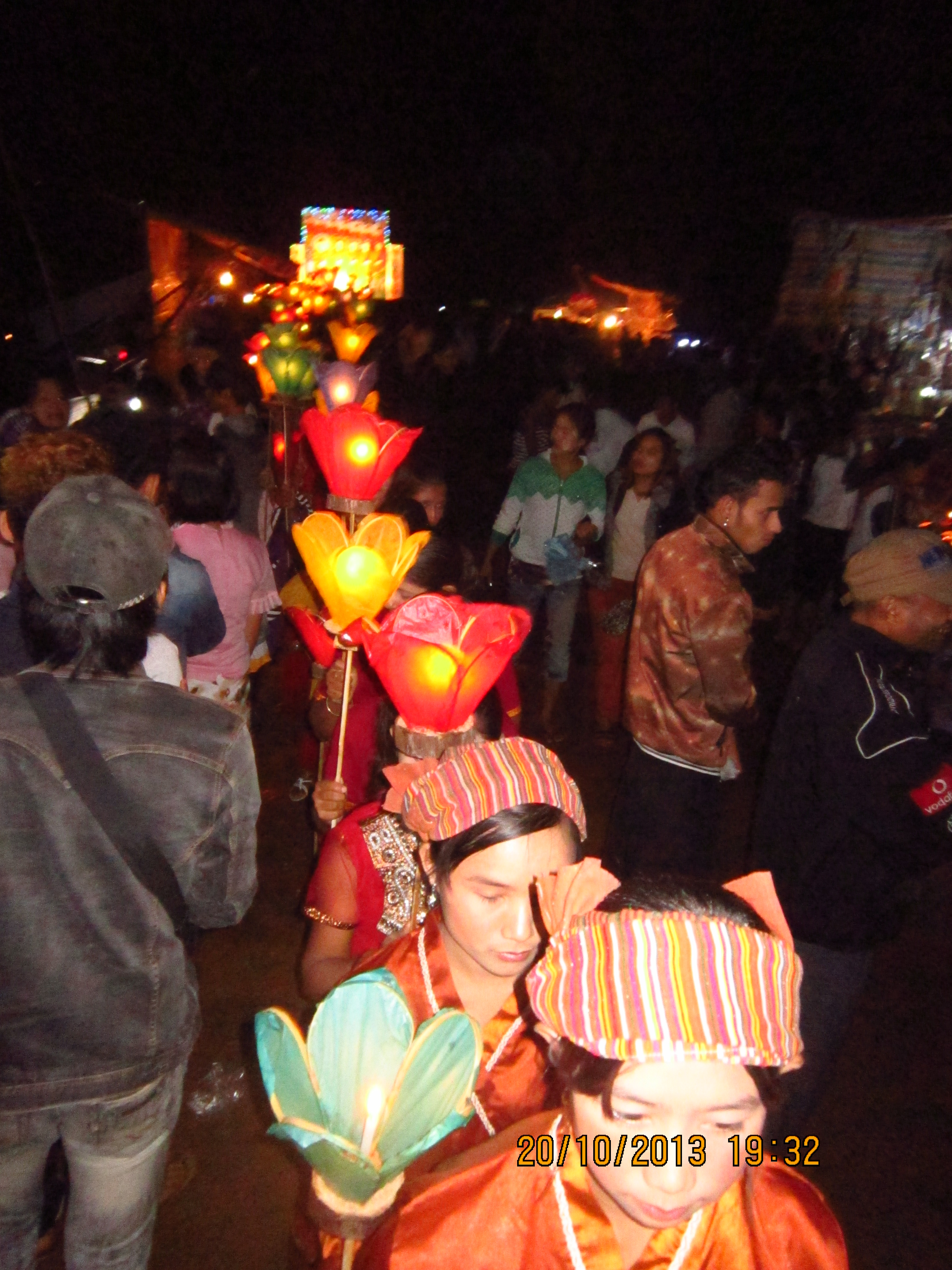
A festival of 9000 paper lanterns lighting in Aye Thar Yar, Taunggyi

Participants tie paper lanterns to bamboo sticks and carry them in procession. In some rural Pa'O communities, large "paper lantern trees" are constructed from bamboo poles, carried on the shoulders of dozens of men. Traditional musical instruments from Shan State including gongs, the Shan long drum (Burmese: ရှမ်းအိုးစည်), and cymbals are played, while others perform traditional dances.

Villages in Kayah State and the Yaw people from Gangaw District, Magway Region, also celebrate lantern lighting ceremonies.

== Etymology ==
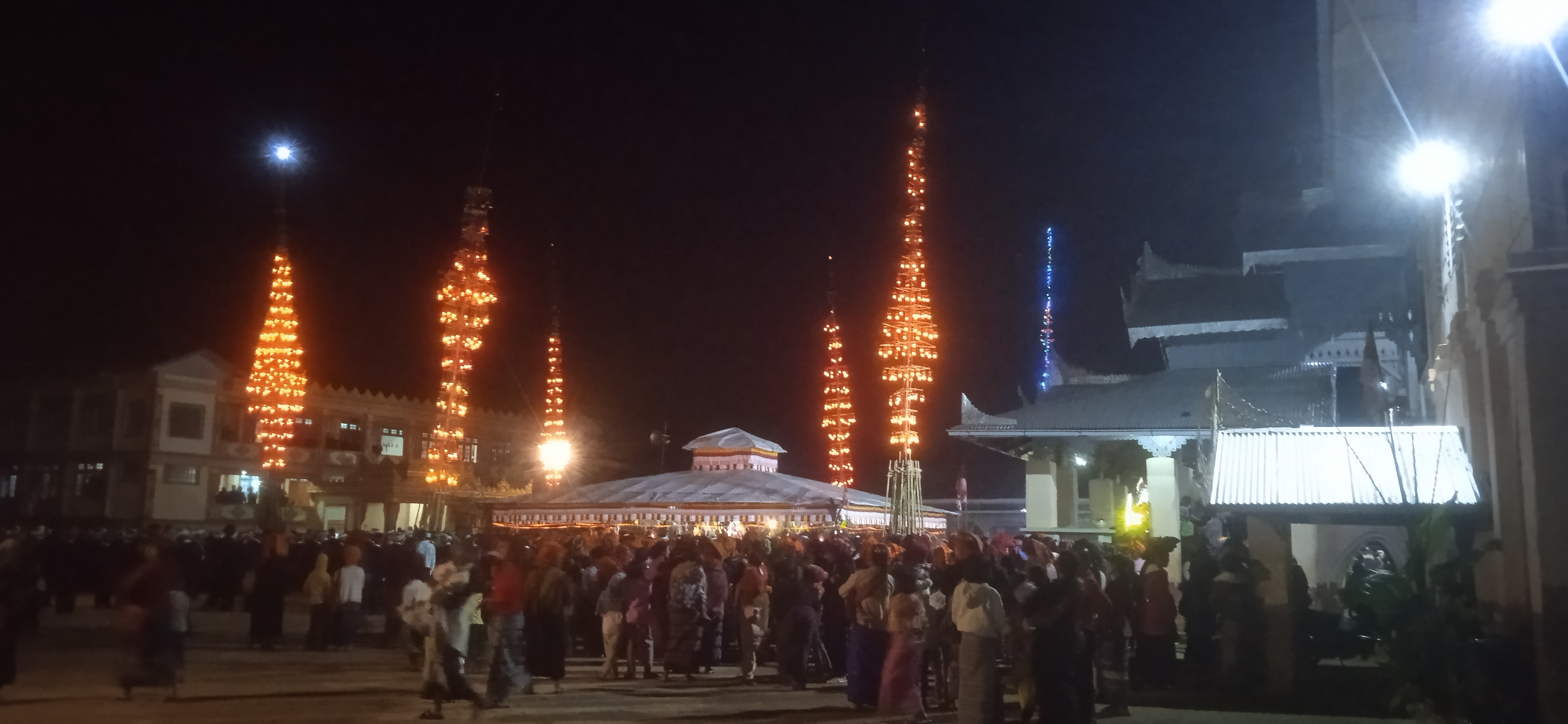
Paper lanterns ceremony from Pinlaung Township, 19 October 2025

In the Pa'O language, the term မေႏဗို (Maybo) means "lotus fire" or light of a candle in a lotus flower. The Burmese term "မီးကြာ" is believed to be a direct translation of this phrase. The word "မီးပုံး" is also used generally for lanterns in Burmese.

== See also ==
- Thadingyut Festival
- Tazaungdaing Festival
- Pa'O people
