= Korean calendar =

Traditional calendar

Today (at UTC+00)
- Wednesday, 14 October 2026
- Korean: 4 Gaedal, 4359 DE
Other calendars
Akan	Fowukuo
Armenian	26 Sahmi 1476
Aztec	Izcalli 12, 5 Cōātl
Babylonian	1 Tashritu, 2337 SE
Balinese pawukon	Luang, Pepet, Pasah, Jaya, Wage, Tungleh, Buda of Kelawu, Kala, Dangu, Pati
Bengali	29 Ashshin, BS 1433
Chinese	Yin Metal Rooster・Chariot Mansion; Fire Horse Year, Month 9, Day 5 (Hanlu, 9 days until Shuangjiang)
Common Era	14 October 2026 CE
Coptic	4 Paopi, AM 1743
Egyptian	1 Phamenoth, 2775 NE
Ethiopian	4 Ṭeqemt, 2019 Amätä Məhrät
French Republican	Décade III, Duodi de Vendémiaire de l'Année 235 de la République
Gregorian	14 October, AD 2026
Hebrew	3 Cheshvan, AM 5787
Hindu	Anurādhā・Ayuṣmān; Solar: 28 Āśvina, 1948 SE; Lunisolar: Caturthī, Śukla pakṣa of Āśvina, 2083 VE; Rāudra・5127 KY・1,872,862
Icelandic	Miðvikudagur, 21 Haustmánuður 2026
Islamic	2 Jumada al-awwal, AH 1448 (using tabular method)
ISO week date	2026-W42-3
Japanese	4 Nagatsuki, Reiwa 8 (Kanro, 9 days until Sōkō)
Julian	1 October, AD 2026 (AM 7535)
Julian day	2461328
Maya	13.0.14.0.5; 18 Yax, 5 Chicchan
Roman	Kalendis Octobribus, MMDCCLXXIX AUC
Solar Hijri	22 Mehr, SH 1405
Tibetan	4 tha skar, me pho rta 2153 or 1772 or 1000

Throughout its many years of history, various calendar systems have been used in Korea. Many of them were adopted from the Chinese calendar system, with modifications occasionally made to accommodate Korea's geographic location and seasonal patterns.

The solar Gregorian calendar was adopted in 1896, by Gojong of Korea. Koreans now mostly use the Gregorian calendar; however, traditional holidays and age-reckoning for older generations are still based on the traditional lunisolar calendar.

== History ==
During the early Goryeo period, the Tang-made Xuanming calendar (선명력; 宣明曆) was used until 1281. While the Tang revised the Xuanming calendar several times, Korea insisted on using an unmodified version until Munjong's reign, when several improvised calendars were created, such as the Sipchŏng (십정력; 十精曆), Ch'iryo (칠요력; 七曜曆), Kyŏnhaeng (견행력; 見行曆), Tun'gap (둔갑력; 遁甲曆), and T'aeil (태일력; 太一曆) calendars.

In 1281 (the 7th year of Chungnyeol's reign) the Yuan-made Shòushí calendar (수시력; 授時曆) was adopted. However, Goryeo scholars tended to prefer the obsolete Xuanming calendar, which they were more accustomed to. During the late Goryeo period a revised version of Shòushí, known as the Taet'ong calendar (대통력; 大統曆), saw limited use.

Shòushí continued as the standard calendar until early Joseon, when the Ch'ilchŏngsan (칠정산; 七政算) was created to serve as the first Korea-specific calendar system during the reign of Sejong the Great. The Ch'ilchŏngsan consisted of two books, the Ch'ilchŏngsannaep'yŏn (칠정산내편; 七政算內篇), which detailed methods to accurately calculate dates and celestial movements regarding Korea's geographic location based on the Shòushí calendar, and the Ch'ilchŏngsanoep'yŏn (칠정산외편;七政算 外篇), which was based on the Huihui Lifa.

Beginning in 1644 (22nd year of Injo's reign), Korean scholars began discussing the adaptation of the Qing-made Shixian calendar (시헌력; 時憲暦; siheollyeok), as the limitations of the Ch'ilchŏngsan became clear. Although the Shixian calendar was officially adopted in 1653 (4th year of Hyojong's reign), it was not implemented in earnest until 1725 (1st year of Yeongjo's reign) as Korean scholars had little knowledge of western astronomy (which heavily influenced the Shixian calendar) and the Qing were reluctant to reveal any information of their new innovation.

The traditional calendar designated its years via Korean era names from 270 to 963, then Chinese era names with Korean era names at a few times until 1894. In 1894 and 1895, the lunar calendar was used with years numbered from the foundation of the Joseon Dynasty in 1392.

The Gregorian calendar was adopted on 1 January 1896, with the Korean era name Geonyang (건양; 建陽; lit. ''adopting solar calendar'').

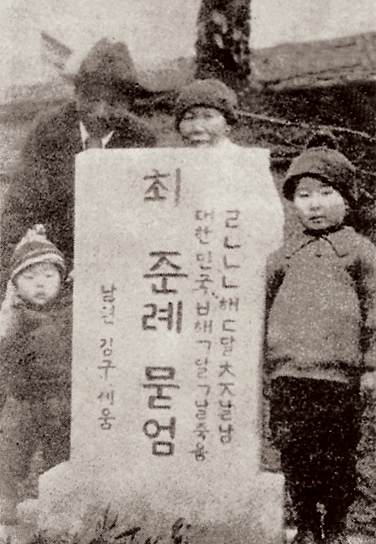
The gravestone of Kim Ku's wife, Ch'oe Chun-rye, uses the Dangun calendar written using hangul numerals (ㄱ=1, ㄴ=2, etc) for her birth year ("ㄹㄴㄴㄴ해" = 4222 = 1889 CE). For her death year, it uses hangul numerals to indicate the number of years after the founding of the Korean Provisional Government ("ㅂ해" = 6 = 1924 CE).

From 1945 until 1961 in South Korea, the Dangun calendar was used, where Gregorian calendar years were counted from the foundation of Gojoseon in 2333 BC (regarded as year one), the date of the legendary founding of Korea by Dangun. These Dangi (단기; 檀紀) years were 4278 to 4294. This numbering was informally used with the Korean lunar calendar before 1945 but has only been occasionally used since 1961, and mostly in North Korea prior to 1997.

Although not being an official calendar, in South Korea, the traditional Korean calendar is still maintained by the government. The current version is based on the Shixian calendar, which was in turn revised by Jesuit scholars.

In North Korea, the Juche calendar was used between 1997 and 2024 to number its years, based on the birth of the state's founder Kim Il Sung.

== Features ==
- The Chinese zodiac of 12 Earthly Branches (animals), which were used for counting hours and years;
- Ten Heavenly Stems, which were combined with the 12 Earthly Branches to form a sixty-year cycle;
- Twenty-four solar terms (Korean: 절기; Hanja: 節氣; RR: jeolgi) in the year, spaced roughly 15 days apart;
- Lunar months including leap months added every two or three years.

== Weekdays ==
Note that traditional Korean calendar has no concept of weekdays: the following are names of weekdays in the modern (Western) calendar.

English	Hangul	Hanja	Transliteration	Heavenly body	5 Elements (오행; 五行)
Sunday	일요일	日曜日	il.yo.il: iryoil	Sun	
Monday	월요일	月曜日	wŏl.yo.il: woryoil	Moon	
Tuesday	화요일	火曜日	hwa.yo.il: hwayoil	Mars	Fire
Wednesday	수요일	水曜日	su.yo.il: suyoil	Mercury	Water
Thursday	목요일	木曜日	mok.yo.il: mogyoil	Jupiter	Wood
Friday	금요일	金曜日	kŭm.yo.il: geumyoil	Venus	Metal
Saturday	토요일	土曜日	tho.yo.il: toyoil	Saturn	Earth

== Months ==
In modern Korean language, the months of both the traditional lunisolar and Western calendars are named by prefixing Sino-Korean numerals to wol, the Sino-Korean word for "month". Traditionally, when speaking of individuals' birth months, the months of the lunisolar calendar were named by prefixing the native Korean name of the animal associated with each Earthly Branch in the Chinese zodiac to dal, the native Korean word for "month".

Additionally, the first, eleventh, and twelfth months have other Korean names which are similar to traditional Chinese month names. However, the other traditional Chinese month names are not used in Korean.

Korean month names with Chinese lunisolar equivalents
Number		Modern name (월, wol)							Traditional name (달, dal)					
Number		English	Translation	Korean			Chinese		English / translation	Korean		Chinese		Earliest start
01	一	January	month 1	1월	일월	il-wol	正月	zhēngyuè	Tiger Month	호랑이달	ho-rang-i-dal	寅月	yínyuè	Jan 21
01	一	January	primary month	1월	정월	jeong-wol	正月	zhēngyuè	Tiger Month	호랑이달	ho-rang-i-dal	寅月	yínyuè	Jan 21
02	二	February	month 2	2월	이월	i-wol	二月	èryuè	Rabbit Month	토끼달	to-kki-dal	卯月	mǎoyuè	Feb 20
03	三	March	month 3	3월	삼월	sam-wol	三月	sānyuè	Dragon Month	용달	yong-dal	辰月	chényuè	Mar 21
04	四	April	month 4	4월	사월	sa-wol	四月	sìyuè	Snake Month	뱀달	baem-dal	巳月	sìyuè	Apr 20
05	五	May	month 5	5월	오월	o-wol	五月	wǔyuè	Horse Month	말달	mal-dal	午月	wǔyuè	May 21
06	六	June	month 6	6월	유월	yu-wol	六月	liùyuè	Sheep Month	양달	yang-dal	未月	wèiyuè	Jun 21
07	七	July	month 7	7월	칠월	chir-wol	七月	qīyuè	Monkey Month	원숭이달	won-sung-i-dal	申月	shēnyuè	Jul 23
08	八	August	month 8	8월	팔월	par-wol	八月	bāyuè	Rooster Month	닭달	dak-dal	酉月	yǒuyuè	Aug 23
09	九	September	month 9	9월	구월	gu-wol	九月	jiǔyuè	Dog Month	개달	gae-dal	戌月	xūyuè	Sep 23
10	十	October	month 10	10월	시월	shi-wol / si-wol	十月	shíyuè	Pig Month	돼지달	dwae-ji-dal	亥月	hàiyuè	Oct 23
11	十一	November	month 11	11월	십일월	shi-bir-wol / shib-ir-wol	十一月	shíyīyuè	Rat Month	쥐달	jwi-dal	子月	zǐyuè	Nov 22
11	十一	November	month 11	11월	십일월	shi-bir-wol / shib-ir-wol	十一月	shíyīyuè	winter solstice month	동짓달	dong-jit-dal	冬月	dōngyuè, 'winter month'	Nov 22
12	十二	December	month 12	12월	십이월	shib-i-wol	十二月	shíèryuè	Ox Month	소달	so-dal	丑月	chǒuyuè	Dec 22
12	十二	December	month 12	12월	십이월	shib-i-wol	腊月	làyuè	preservation month	섣달	seot-dal	臘月	làyuè 'end-of-year month'	Dec 22

== Festivals ==
The lunar calendar is used for the observation of traditional festivals, such as Seollal, Chuseok, and Buddha's Birthday. It is also used for jesa memorial services for ancestors and the marking of birthdays by older Koreans.

=== Traditional holidays ===
Festival	Significance	Events	Date (Lunar)	Food
Seollal (설날)	Lunar New Year's Day	An ancestral service is offered before the grave of the ancestors, New Year's greetings are exchanged with family, relatives and neighbors; bows to elders (sebae, 세배; 歲拜), yunnori.	Day 1 of Month 1	tteokguk, yakgwa.
Daeboreum (대보름; 大보름)	First full moon	Greeting of the moon (dalmaji, 달맞이), kite-flying, burning talismans to ward off evil spirits (aengmagi taeugi, 액막이 태우기), bonfires (daljip taeugi, 달집 태우기).	Day 15 of Month 1	rice boiled with five grains (o-gok-bap, 오곡밥; 五穀飯), eating nuts, e.g. walnuts, pine nuts, peanuts, chestnuts (bureom, 부럼), wine drinking (gwibalgisul)
Meoseumnal (머슴날)	Festival for servants	Housecleaning, coming of age ceremony, fishermen's shaman rite (yeongdeunggut, 영등굿)	Day 1 of Month 2	songpyeon
Samjinnal (삼짇날)	Migrant swallows return	Leg fighting, fortune telling.	Day 3 of Month 3	azalea wine (dugyeonju, 두견주, 杜鵑酒), azalea rice cake (dugyeon hwajeon, 두견화전, 杜鵑花煎)
Hansik (한식; 寒食)	Beginning of farming season	Visit to ancestral grave for offering rite, and cleaning and maintenance.	Day 105 after winter solstice	cold food only: mugwort cake (ssuktteok, 쑥떡), mugwort dumplings (ssukdanja, 쑥단자), mugwort soup (ssuktang, 쑥탕)
Chopail (초파일; 初八日) Seokga Tansinil (석가탄신일; 釋迦誕生日)	Buddha's Birthday	Yeondeunghoe (Lotus Lantern festival)	Day 8 of Month 4	rice cake (jjintteok, 찐떡), flower rice cake (hwajeon, 화전, 花煎)
Dano (Korean: 단오; Hanja: 端午) or Surinnal (수릿날)	Spring festival	Washing hair with iris water, wrestling (ssireum, 씨름), swinging, giving fans as gifts	Day 5 of Month 5	rice cake with herbs (surichwitteok, 수리취떡), herring soup (junchiguk, 준치국)
Yudu (유두; 流頭)	Water greeting	Water greeting, washing hair to wash away bad luck	Day 15 of Month 6	Five coloured noodles (yudumyeon, 유두면), cooked rice cake (sudan, 수단, 水團)
Chilseok (칠석; 七夕)	Meeting day of Gyeonwu and Jiknyeo, in Korean folk tale	Fabric weaving	Day 7 of Month 7	wheat pancake (miljeonbyeong, 밀전병), steamed rice cake with red beans (sirutteok, 시루떡)
Baekjung (백중; 百中)	Worship to Buddha	Worship to Buddha.	Day 15 of Month 7	mixed rice cake (seoktanbyeong, 석탄병, 惜呑餠)
Chuseok (추석; 秋夕)	Harvest festival	Visit to ancestral grave, ssireum, offering earliest rice grain (olbyeosinmi, 올벼신미; 올벼新味), circle dance (ganggang sullae, 강강술래)	Day 15 of Month 8	pine-flavored rice cake stuffed with chestnuts, sesame or beans (songpyeon, 송편), taro soup (torantang, 토란탕)
Jungyangjeol (중양절; 重陽節)	Migrant sparrows leave	Celebrating autumn with poetry and painting, composing poetry, enjoying nature	Day 9 of Month 9	chrysanthemum pancake (gukhwajeon, 국화전, 菊花煎), fish roe, honey citron tea (yuja-cheong)
Dongji (동지; 冬至)	Winter Solstice	Rites to dispel bad spirits.	Around December 22 in the solar calendar	red bean porridge (patjuk) with rice dumplings
Seotdal Geumeum (섣달그믐)	New Year's Eve	Staying up all night long with all doors open to receive ancestral spirits	Last day of Month 12	bibimbap, injeolmi, traditional biscuits (han-gwa, 한과; 韓菓)

There are also many regional festivals celebrated according to the lunar calendar.

== See also ==
- Festivals of Korea
- Korean era name
- Sexagenary cycle
- Public holidays in North Korea
- Public holidays in South Korea
