= Korean traditional funeral =

A Korean traditional funeral features elements originating in Korean Confucianism as well as centuries of influence from indigenous Korean shamanism. Numerous anthropological scholars have attempted to discern which practices come from Shamanistic roots, and which are more purely Confucian.

== Funeral rituals ==
Traditionally, the body will stay in the house for three days, however in more recent times, it can (on rare occasions) extend to five or seven days, depending on the season of the year. The time of death is of great importance to traditional Koreans, so much so that a white piece of cotton is often put under the nose of someone who is thought to be near death to ascertain the most accurate account of the time. Immediately after the individual has passed, a white coat or cloak that was last worn by the recently departed is rushed to the roof, and a declaration is made in all four cardinal directions, as Confucian ideals attributed meanings to each. The family of the dead will prepare three bowls each of rice, vegetables, soups and set out three units of money and three pairs of shoes outside the entrance of the house to the messengers from the other world. The eldest son will go find a burial location, often with the aid of a professional geomancer, as the location is very important from a Confucian standpoint. There is an entire school of thought dedicated to the life-energy associated with the perfect physical location known as pungsu-jiri. It is believed that, if all things are not settled correctly, the spirit of the deceased will fail to proceed to the afterlife, and a ‘lost’ soul is thought to bring unfortunate happenings to the village. The perfect location is to have four natural features around it. First, to the front of the burial site, (preferably to the south) a form of water such as a river, stream, or the sea. Secondly, a mountain to the left signifying a protective tiger is always seen as good, along with a mountain to the right, signifying a protective dragon. Finally, a hill or mountain behind symbolizes a lucky turtle.

The wife of the eldest son will be responsible for the food and for the preparations for the main funeral service and can enlist the assistance of relatives of the family who will come to help with arrangements and cook preparation of food for the many guests who will come to pay their respects and gain or maintain some standing with the family, as depicted by the 1996 award-winning film, Chukje (translated Festival).

Also, the corpse will be washed in incense water and dressed in grave clothes. Then, after plugging cotton in the ears and nose of the dead and placing coins over the eyes, the mouth will be filled with three spoonfuls of rice. Each spoonful is given with a statement that it is to represent far more, wishing the deceased an afterlife of plenty. The body will be bound from head to foot with shrouds in seven layers and put in a coffin, which is bound in three places by long strips of cloth, with a mattress under the body, a blanket covering the body, and the deceased's clothes filled in other spaces.

During the Imperial period, for a royal funeral, servants needed to make decorative instruments like thick paper, wood, straw mats, and cotton fabrics for the funeral ceremony.

Korea became a colony of Japan in August 1910, and in June 1912 the Japanese Governor-General announced the "Ordinance to control graves, crematories, burials and cremation" (jp. Bochi kasō maisō oyobi kasō torishimari kisoku), which instituted public cemeteries and cremation. As Biontino notes, "These policies aimed at improving health and hygiene, but they were also deemed necessary out of a concern for space: much arable land was occupied with graves," although by doing so, "Japanese authorities challenged not only secular problems, but also attacked the spirituality of the Koreans." As Han also notes, "public cemeteries were incompatible with the burial practices that permeated Korean society at that time," and in fact "this dissonance between the stipulations of the Ordinance and resilient local beliefs triggered the masses’ wish for specially selected graveyards, which facilitated the overall expansion of the Fengshui-related professions."

== Burial rituals ==
The first step of preparing for burial is bathing the corpse with perfumed water and dressing it in the traditional death dress made of silk or sambe hempen fabric. Then, the corpse is wrapped up in a hemp quilt and bound with ropes seven times. After the corpse is fully dressed, the coffin's lid will be tightly sealed and placed in a dry and secure place within the house.

The second step is transporting the coffin to the gravesite. Those who carry the bier out of the house have to stop before the gate and lower the coffin three times as a form of ritual bowing. The procession is led by someone who sings the mournful song and the other family members, relatives and friends follow at the back.

After that, the burial is started. A shaman will perform a special ritual to exorcise the evil spirits from the grave after arriving at the gravesite. Then, the coffin is lowered and the eldest male mourner takes a deep bow and stands on top of the coffin, treading down on the earth as it is thrown into the grave, followed by the other family members.

Finally, the grave is completed by building a mound of soil and covering it with grass.

== Confucian death rites ==
Many Korean traditional ceremonies are influenced by Confucian culture. The following methods and requirements of mourning are one such example.

First, people should be mourning for three years during which time Jesa ceremonies must be held, because when their parents died it reflects their filial piety. It is the most important sentiment in Confucian culture.

Second, during the funeral, the female family members must be continuing to weep and demonstrate their grief. People believe this performance proves the importance and value of the deceased. However, men are not allowed to cry at the funeral and are required to control their emotions. In traditional Korean culture, the image of a male should be rational and calm, and female is emotional and sensitive. Therefore, the male must restrain his sadness.

Third, the relatives and friends will write a funeral oration to mourn the deceased and express their grief. This not only details the life of the deceased, but also praises his merits and achievements. It reflects the culture and history of the whole family of the deceased. Consequently, the oration is very formal. It can be written as a biography, epitaph or a letter to the deceased.

== Shamanistic death rites ==
Though it is diminishing in commonality, there are still two variations of Shamanistic funeral rites that survived the Joseon and Japanese periods of Korean history. The kosa, an offering rite to the spirits before starting a new company. The offerings and the prayers are to bring the graciousness of the spirits. The gut is a shamanistic dance declined under various aspects, that the mudang or the paksu carries out in trance. It allows to contact the spirits, to predict the future or to know the past. They vary mostly by the regions from which they originate but have very much the same basic premise, that souls of those who fail to completely or properly transition to the afterlife, can linger and create bad fate for the villages they are from. Much of this idea comes from the veneration of their ancestors that came from the Neo-Confucian teachings that became prevalent just before the Joseon dynasty as they were melded with the organic religions of the ancient Korean peoples.

In the more Southern and South Eastern portions of Korea, now known as the Jeolla provinces, Shamanistic Priestesses, known as Sesup-mu, were a hereditary priestly line. One of the death rites they typically performed, known as the ‘Ssigum Kut (or ritual), appears very much as a cleansing of the soul to prepare it for the afterlife. It consists of rolling up an article of clothing or a parchment signifying the individual in a rug, standing it up vertically, capping the rug with a metal lid, and pouring scented water over it. This form of Shamanism is in more rapid decline as the hereditary Sesup-mu are becoming increasingly rare.

In other parts of Korea, particularly those to the North of the Han River, but spread more broadly across the whole of the peninsula, are a different kind of Shaman known as the Mudang. They are also predominantly female and are known individually as ‘Kangshin-mu’ Rather than a priestess, they act as more of a spiritual medium who invites spirits into their person to perform various functions on behalf of the dead. There are more variations of their kut, but one of the most common is known as the Chingogwi Kut, and can consist of anywhere from nine to 16 or more individual rites during the process. The number and type are often tailored to the way the individual lived and or died, with those who passed more tragically requiring more interaction with various deities, and therefore more individual ‘rites’ to be added to the process. One of the most common among all ceremonies involve the Mudang inviting the spirit of a deity known as ‘Princess Pari’ who assist the newly departed to pass from this life to the next by crossing a cotton cloth that is spread across the room (symbolizing the path to eternal bliss) and avoiding a parallel path down a hemp cloth, symbolizing a less desirable outcome.

== Contemporary funerals ==
Today, these funeral traditions are upheld with a modern twist. The two prominent changes concern the venue of the funeral and the method of body disposal. Traditionally, death occurs at home. When people are hospitalized with serious illness, every effort is made to bring them home to die and thus keeping their spirits from wandering and becoming disoriented. Nowadays, most hospitals are equipped for holding funerals, transforming the mortuary into a funeral hall to allow for the following cremation. Funeral shops in hospitals often offer one-stop funeral services to satisfy every need of the client.

Since class distinction has declined, Koreans today seldom decide funeral dates based on the deceased's social status, and rather tend to hold the funeral on the third day after death. In modern Korean funerals, no eulogies are held. Visitors bow twice to the deceased and once to the mourner with words of condolences to show respect. Various delicacies and wine are served to the visitors. Instead of burial, cremation, which has a shorter period of bodily decay, is more commonly practiced nowadays.

== Media ==
=== Film ===
- Festival (1996)
