= Daeboreum =

Traditional Korean holiday

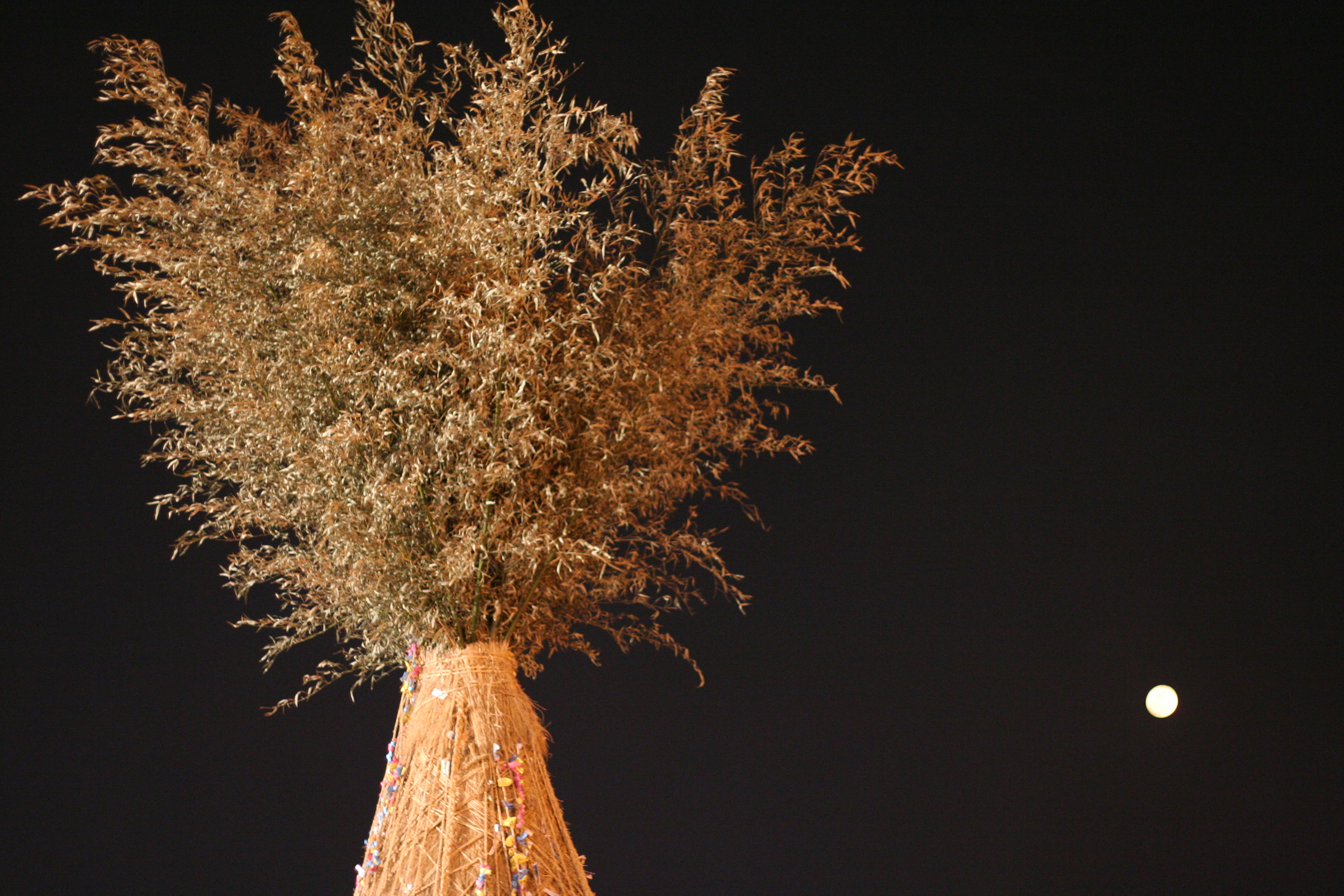
- Official name: Daeboreum (대보름)
- Also called: Great Full Moon
- Observed by: Koreans
- Type: Cultural
- Date: 1st full moon of the lunar year
- Related to: Lantern Festival (in China); Koshōgatsu (in Japan); Tết Nguyên Tiêu (in Vietnam); Chotrul Duchen (in Tibet); Magha Puja (in Thailand, Sri Lanka, Myanmar, Cambodia and Laos)

Korean name
- Hangul: 대보름
- Hanja: 大보름
- Lit.: Great Full Moon
- RR: Daeboreum
- MR: Taeborŭm

Daeboreum (Korean: 대보름; lit. 'Great Full Moon') is a Korean holiday that celebrates the first full moon of the new year of the lunar Korean calendar. This holiday is accompanied by many traditions.

== Origins ==
The record about the origin of Daeboreum is recorded in the book Samguk yusa, where it says that a crow led the 21st King of Silla, Soji to shoot the geomungo (a Korean instrument) case, which was actually where a monk and the royal concubine were committing adultery. After this happening, on the first day of the pig, rat and horse years, people had behaved prudently, and also the 15th of January was called 'Ogiil' (also spelled as 'Oguille') (오기일; 烏忌日) and offered sacrifice to heaven this day. Also the origins of Daeboreum can be recognized by some customs listed in books, such as Samguk sagi and Silla-bongi (신라본기; 新羅本記), describing of lantern lighting. The lantern lighting custom in Daeboreum was inherited constantly; Annals of the Joseon Dynasty, the book of Taejong, 13th year has the record about the same custom clearly.

== Traditions ==
- Bureom (부럼깨기): People crack nuts with their teeth, believing that this will keep one's teeth healthy for the year.
- Dalmaji (달맞이): In the countryside, people climb mountains, braving cold weather, trying to catch the first rise of the moon. It is said that the first person to see the Moon rise will have good luck all year or a wish will be granted.
- Jwibulnori (쥐불놀이): A traditional game that is played the night before Daeboreum. They burn the dry grass on ridges between rice fields while children whirl around cans full of holes, through which charcoal fire blaze. These cans fertilize the fields and get rid of harmful worms that destroy the new crops.
- Gisaebae (기새배): It is a ceremony that farmer's bands in each towns gather together and greet each other in pecking order. Also a competition is held between the bands.
- Bangsaeng (방생): On the night before Daeboreum, the ladies bought jellyfish and put them on the river and wished good luck for the year.
- Boktho-humchigi (복토훔치기): People took some mud from the houses of the rich and covered it on their walls on the night before Daeboreum, wishing they would be wealthy, too.
- Yongaltteugi (용알뜨기): The night before Daeboreum, people wait until a rooster cries and then draw water from a well. It is believed that the one who fetched water first, there will have a good rice harvest that year.
- Daribalgi (다리밟기): It is told that people walked on the bridges all night long, believing that if the step on a bridge, their legs will be strong. It is believed they would be healthy during all twelve months if they step on twelve bridges.
- Deowipalgi (더위팔기): When Someone see a person in the morning, he or she hurries to call his or her name to say "Buy my heat". It is believed that one would escape the scorching heat that summer.
- Gaeboreumsoegi (개보름쇠기): People do not feed their dogs believing that dogs will crock up and be infested with flies if they are fed during the coming summer.
- Mogitbul (모깃불): At the dawn of Daeboreum, people put a straw fire on their yard to eliminate mosquitos and other insects.

== Food ==
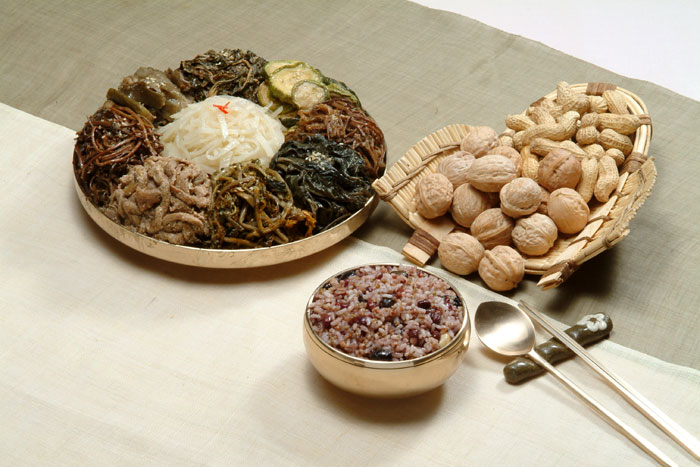
ogokbap and boreum namul and bureom

The traditional foods of Daeboreum have a lot of connections with superstition.

- People drink cold 'Guibargi Wine' in the morning, believing one will only hear good news all year round and will hear better.
- The nutcracking that is described in the book, <Dongguk-sesigi (in 동국세시기)> has been widely spread not only in Korea but also in China and Japan, and it is being performed on New Year's Day, too.
- There is also a custom of eating ogokbap (오곡밥 or chalbap, 찰밥) and yakbap (약밥) around Daeboreum. Yakbap is made by steaming glutinous rice and mixing jujube, chestnut, pine nuts, oil, honey, and soy sauce together. In South Jeolla Province (전라남도), people steamed it with a 'siru' (시루) steamer and gave it to the castellan, so it is called 'castellan rice' or 'siru rice'.
- People eat a lot of dinner early on the 14th and early on the morning of the 15th, which means to be diligent throughout the year. Also it is said that it is better to eat the food of the neighbors. This is called hometown rice (세성받이밥). If you make dinner late, you may lose a dinner to the invited neighbors, so people made an early dinner and invite the neighbors from 2 pm. Also in <Dongguksesigi (in 동국세시기)>, it is described about a similar tradition of 'Baekgaban' in South Jeolla Province – children go to get rice in the morning from the neighbors in Daeboreum. South Gyeongsang Province has the same tradition. They believe it is good for their health.
- There is a tradition of eating a selection of certain seasoned vegetables referred to as boreum namul (보름 나물, or mugeun namul 묵은 나물) as well as bokssam (복쌈): Dishes made from dried vegetables, left over from the previous year (e.g. pumpkin leaves, radish greens, eggplant, mushrooms, ferns) are believed to enable one to cope with the heat in the next summer, when eaten on Daeboreum. Eating bokssam, which is rice wrapped in leafy vegetables, is supposed to bring luck (bok, 복, 福).
- In South Jeolla Province, the barley rice is put into a bowl with herbs and placed on a straw or a wall to give to the crow. There is a similar report in North Jeolla Province and Chungbuk. The crow is now an ominous bird, but in the past, it was a sacred bird, also a symbol of the sun. 'crow's sacrifice' and 'crow's rice' are described in Samguk yusa.

== Gallery ==
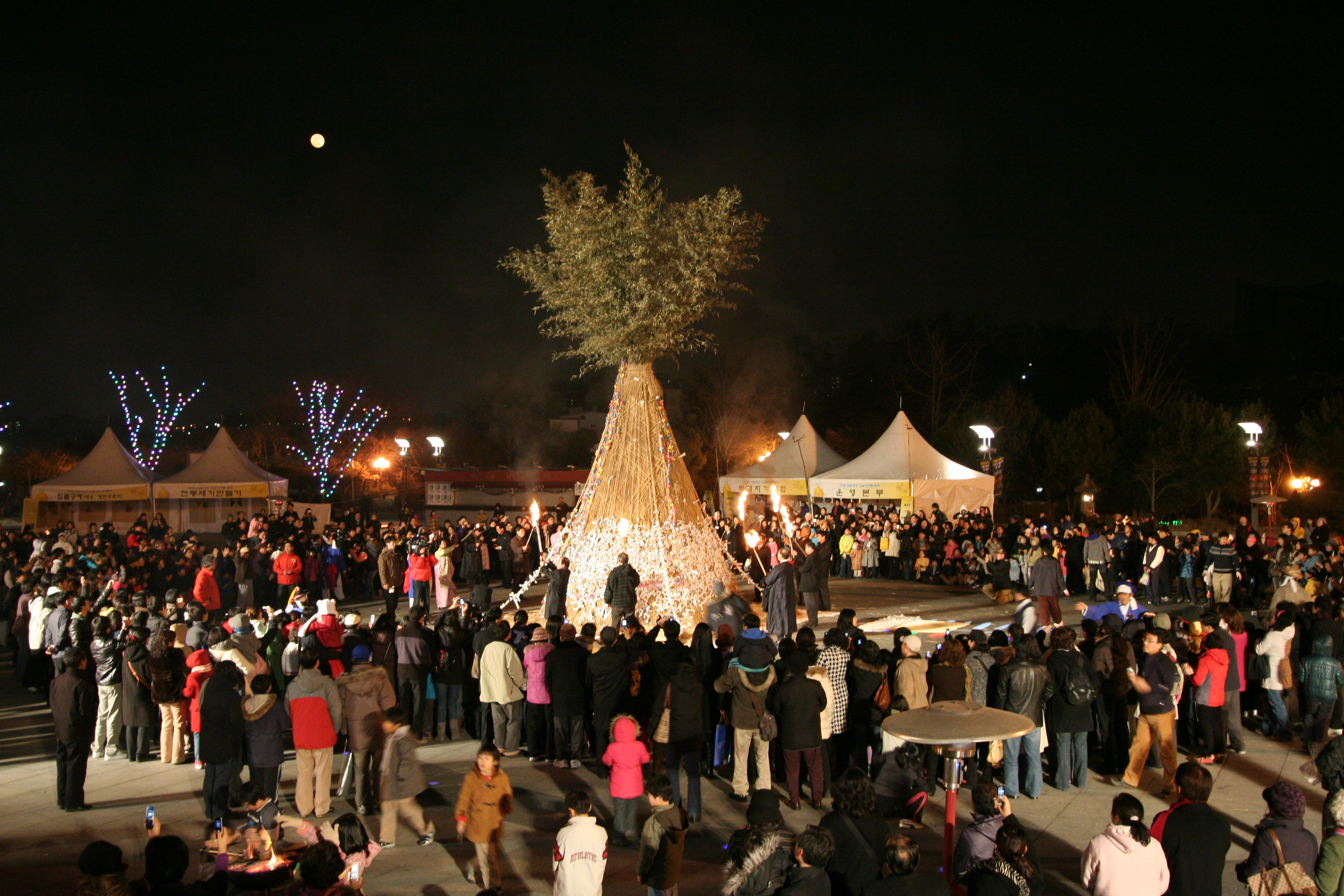

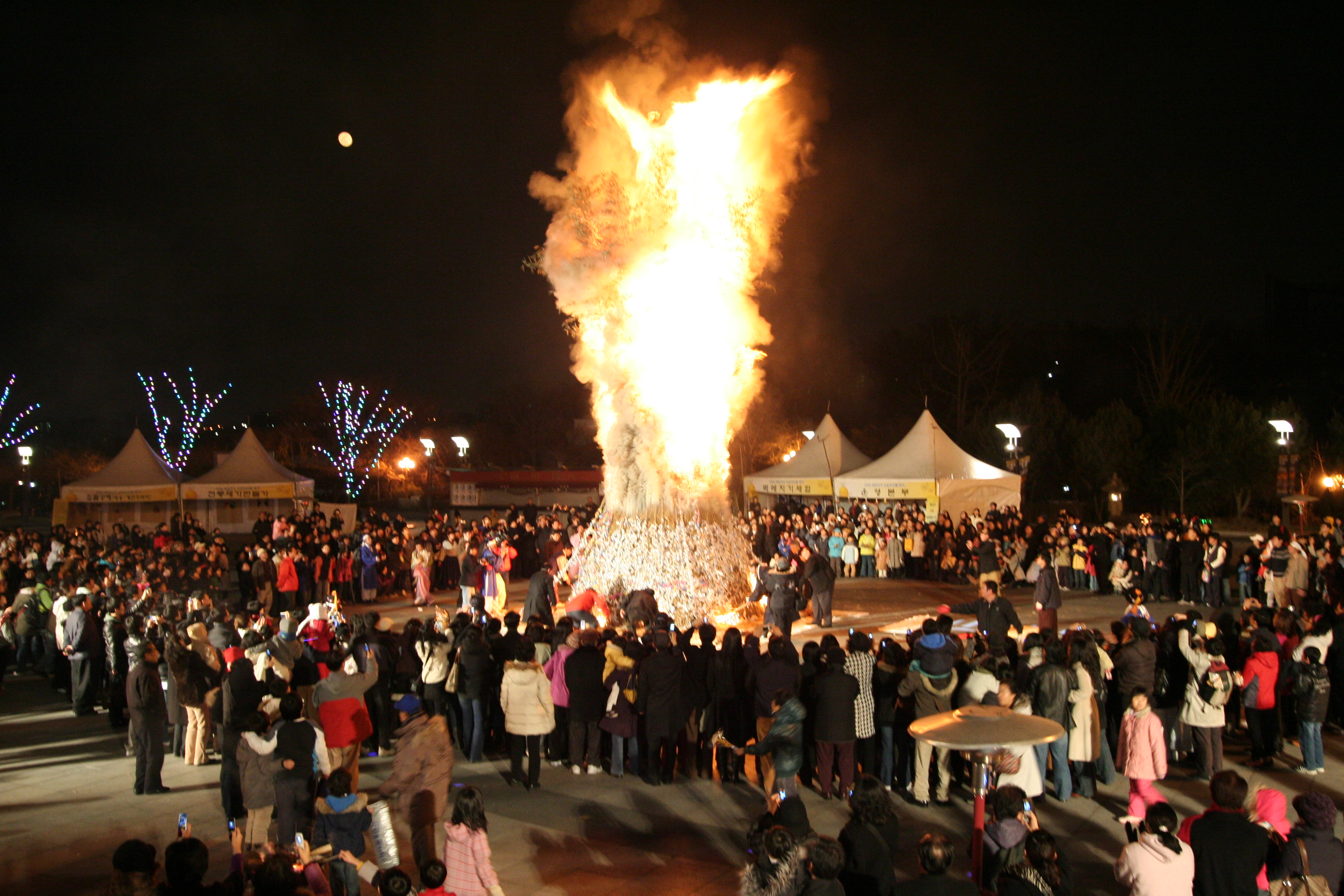

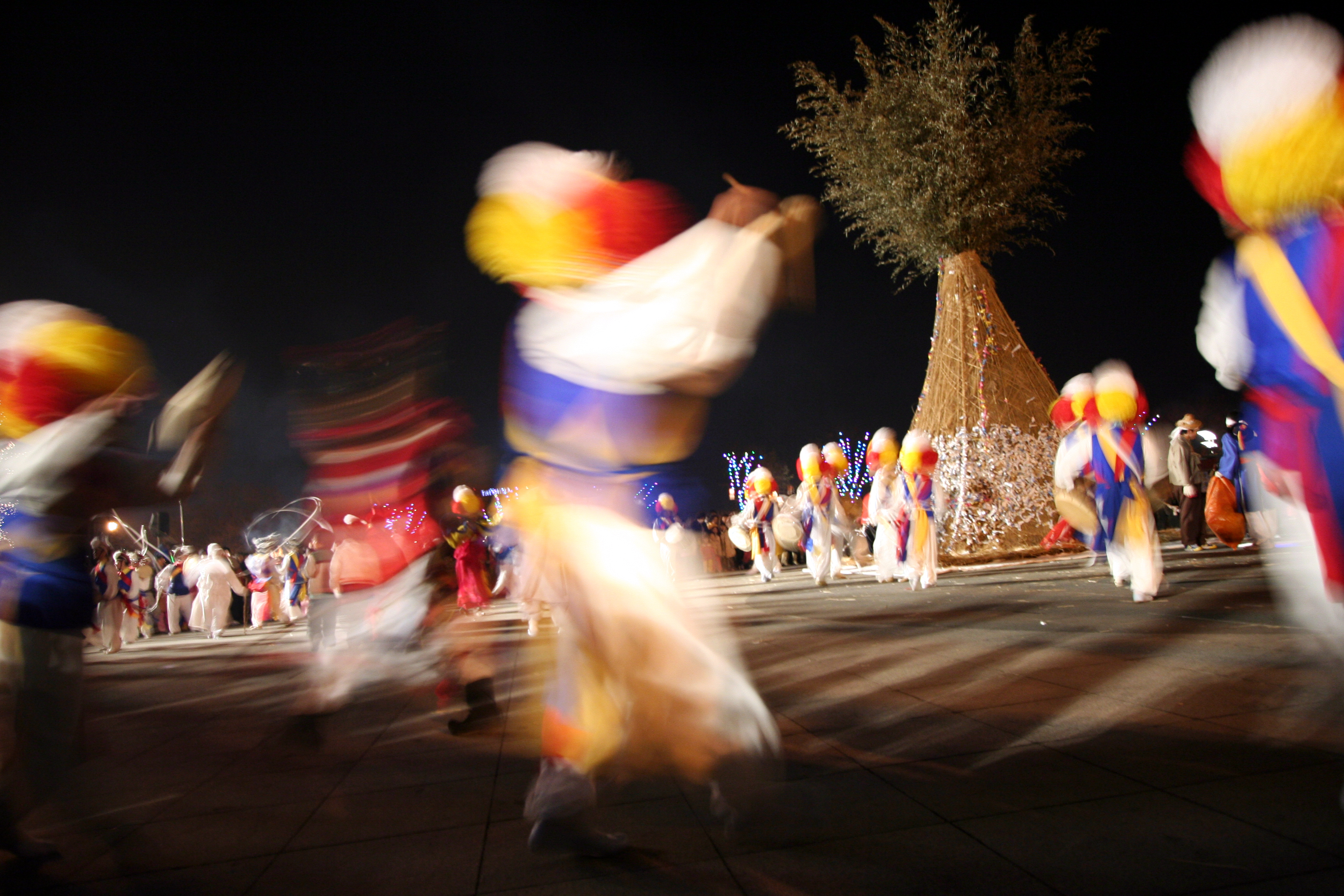

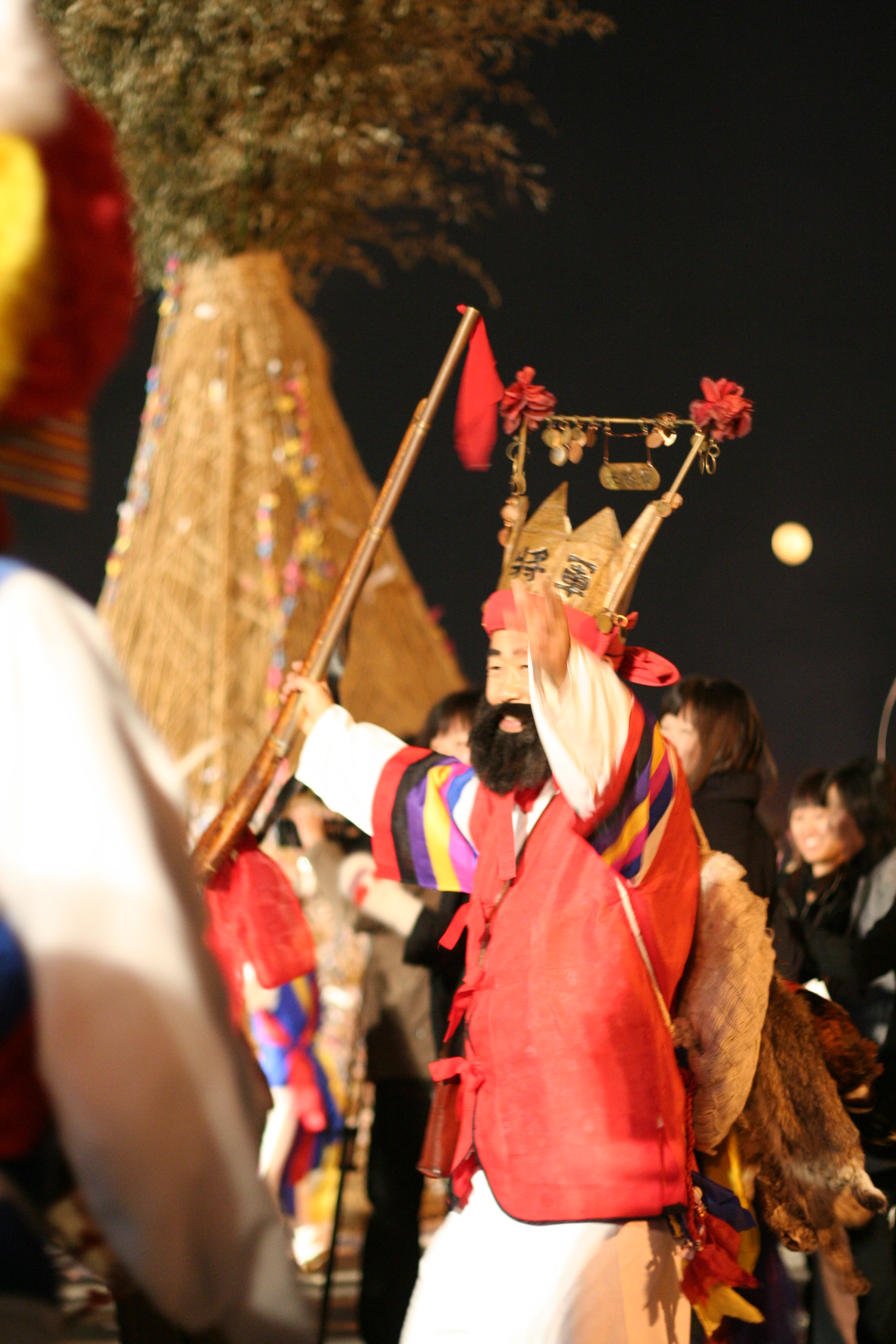

== See also ==
- First Full Moon Festival
  - Lantern Festival, in China
  - Koshōgatsu, in Japan
- Chotrul Duchen, a festival celebrated in Tibet as an Uposatha day and falls on or around the same day as Daeboreum
- Magha Puja, a festival celebrated in Thailand, Sri Lanka, Myanmar, Cambodia and Laos on or around the same day as Daeboreum
- Public holidays in North Korea
- Public holidays in South Korea
