= Ogok-bap =

Korean rice dish

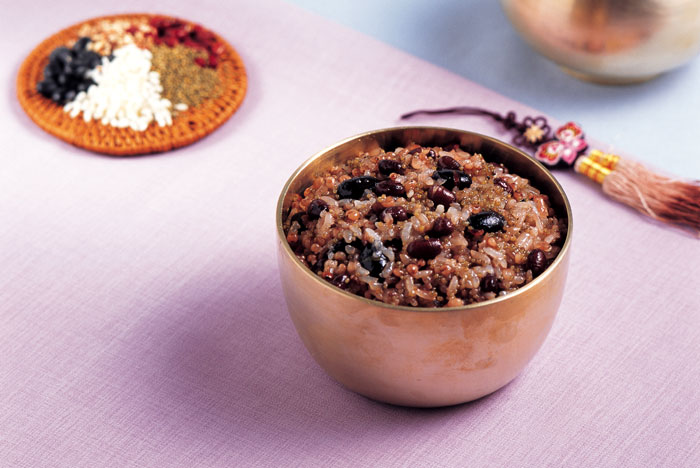
- Alternative names: Five-grain rice
- Type: Bap
- Place of origin: Korea
- Main ingredients: Glutinous rice, proso millet, sorghum, black beans, and red beans
- Food energy (per 1 serving): 123 kcal (510 kJ)

Korean name
- Hangul: 오곡밥
- Hanja: 五穀밥
- RR: ogokbap
- MR: ogokpap
- IPA: [o.ɡok̚.p͈ap̚]

Ogok-bap (Korean: 오곡밥) or five-grain rice is a bap made of glutinous rice mixed with proso millet, sorghum, black beans, and red beans. It is one of the most representative dishes of Daeboreum, the first full moon of the year in the Korean lunar calendar. In the past, the custom of eating ogokbap with boreum-namul (vegetables) and bureom (nuts) on this day helped people replenish nutrients that have been lost during the winter months, when food was scarce. Today, ogokbap is still enjoyed by Koreans for its nutritional and health benefits. It is a common diet food, and an increasing number of people replace their daily white rice with ogokbap, due to a rise in lifestyle diseases like high blood pressure, diabetes, and angina.

== See also ==
- Chalbap, made of glutinous rice mixed with red beans, chestnut, jujube, and black beans
- Japgok-bap, made of rice mixed with various grains
- Kongbap, made of rice mixed with beans
