= Bureom =

Korean nut mix

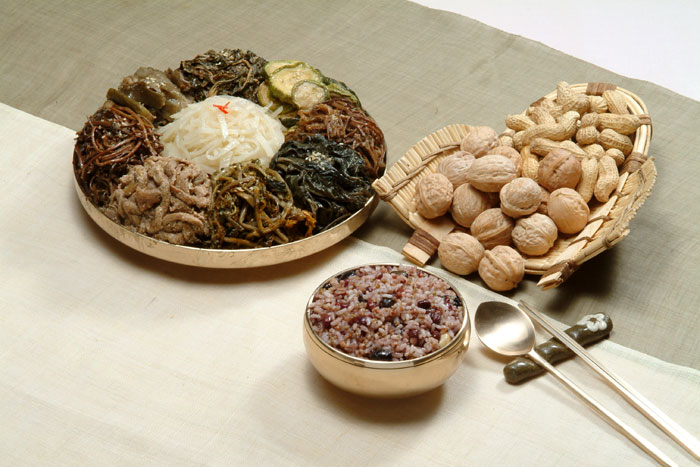
- Bureom with ogokbap and boreum namul

Korean name
- Hangul: 부럼
- RR: bureom
- MR: purŏm
- IPA: pu.ɾʌm

Bureom (Korean: 부럼) is a dish in Korean cuisine that consists of various kinds of nuts such as peanuts, walnuts, pine nuts, chestnuts, and ginkgo nuts. It is popular and traditional to eat during the Daeboreum (literally: "Great Full Moon"), a Korean holiday that celebrates the first full moon of the new year of the lunar Korean calendar. It is believed that cracking a nut in one's mouth early in the morning on Daeboreum will help strengthen teeth, avoid allergies, prevent boils, and bring good luck for the coming year.

== See also ==
- Daeboreum
