= Jwibullori =

Korean traditional game

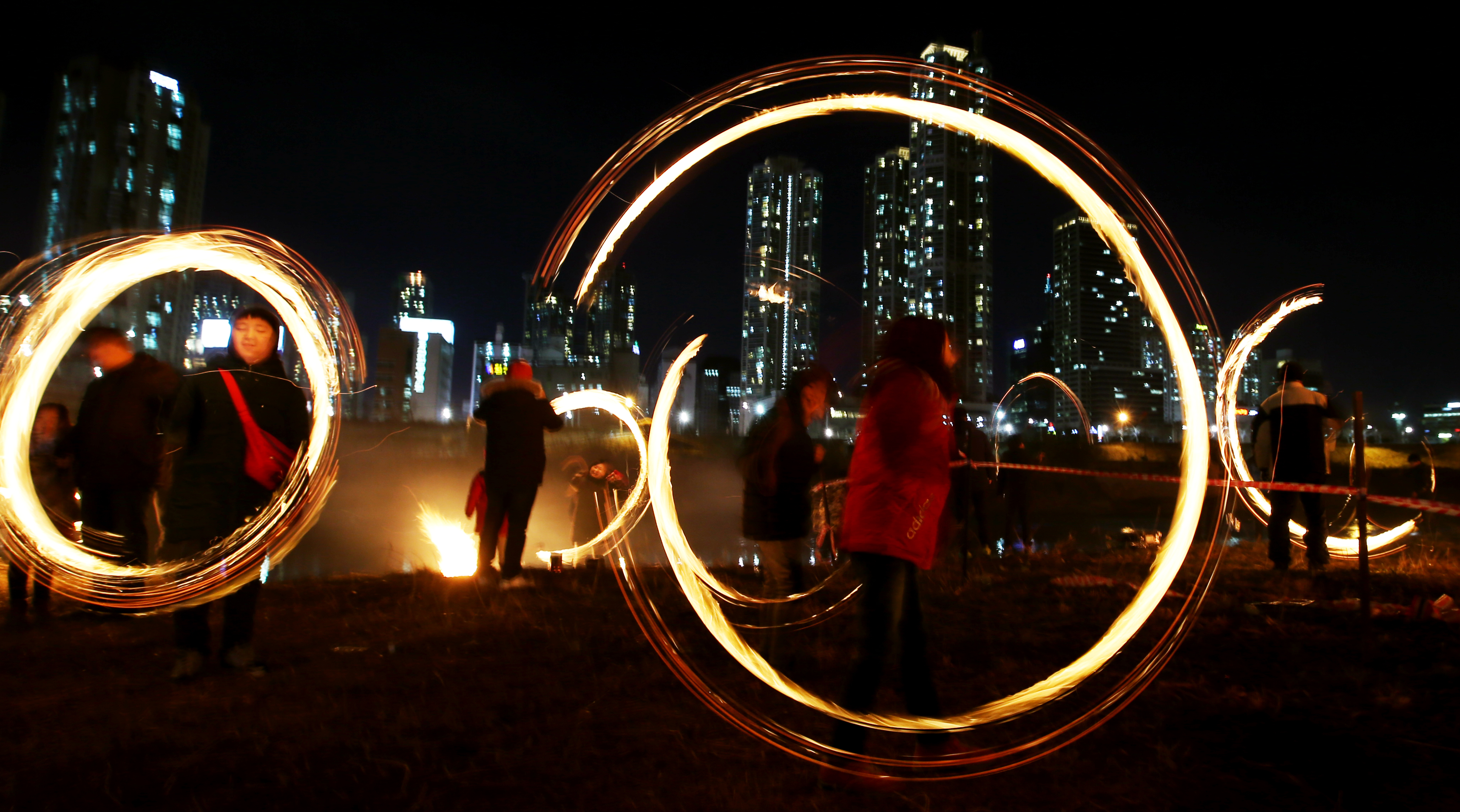

Korean name
- Hangul: 쥐불놀이
- RR: jwibullori
- MR: chwibullori

Jwibullori (Korean: 쥐불놀이) is a Korean game in which participants create streaks of light by swinging cans filled with burning items. The game is played during the first full moon of the year in the lunar calendar, which is a national holiday in Korea. It is played during the time when fires are started on farmlands to exterminate harmful insects and rats by burning away their habitat. Another purpose of the game is to wish for good health.

A boy's game of lighting fires on the banks of rice fields to scare away rats on New Year's Day.

People make a torchlight with a basket or container tied with a strong string. The game is often played by twirling the string. There can also be fights between other village members. They play the game until midnight and, after enjoying the game, the fire is set on the farmland.

It is said that it is good if the fire is strong, so on this day, there is a custom in each village to compete with each other to increase the fire force.

== Meaning ==
Jwibullori is practiced as a folk game in urbanized settings. The game creates a sense of community and burns dead grass, pests and germs, thus, aiding a fruitful harvest. The game welcomes the New Year by purifying old misfortune to obtain good fortune.

It is said that the reason why fires are set in the fields on this day is to exterminate rats because they cause severe damage, remove pests from the fields, and encourage new sprouts.

== Origin ==
Jwibullori originated from the custom of burning the ridge between rice paddies by setting dry grass from the paddy fields on fire the day before New Year's Day.

This fire is not only a Chungcheong-do custom, but a national custom. On this day, youths in each village place straw on the ridges of fields or rice fields near their village, and when the sun sets, they light a fire all at once to burn the weeds.

Depending on the size or size of this rat fire, one can predict good or bad luck for the year or good or bad luck for the village.

== Modern jwibullori ==
Although jwibullori is less often practiced, it is still part of many New Year's Eve festivities. Children use long rings made of wire in cans by drilling holes in the bottom and sides of cans. Jwibullori is typically held at a place where a sheaf burning event is held, in a wide field or a field with a low risk of spreading a fire.

Fire-can game is an activity that has been performed with jwibullori. According to the testimonies of the elderly, it originated from the widespread use of cans after the Korean War. In other words, it was naturally combined with jwibullori while various kinds of canned food among the military materials that were airlifted during the war were used as amusement tools. When the can is swirling and midnight is near, all the wood in the fire-can is burned, leaving only embers. At that point, the can is tossed into the air, letting the embers fall out and glitter the sky. This is seen as a way to send out bad luck and welcome good luck, as is flying a kite on New Year's day.

== Preparation ==
To make a fire-can, dozens of holes are drilled in the surface of an empty can. This creates airflow that feeds the fire. A meter of wire is connected to each side to make a handle.

Typical play is to burn brooms or trees and the fields around the village. Depending on the province, people use kindling made of mugwort or Bulkkangtong (불깡통, meaning: fire-cans).

== Gameplay ==
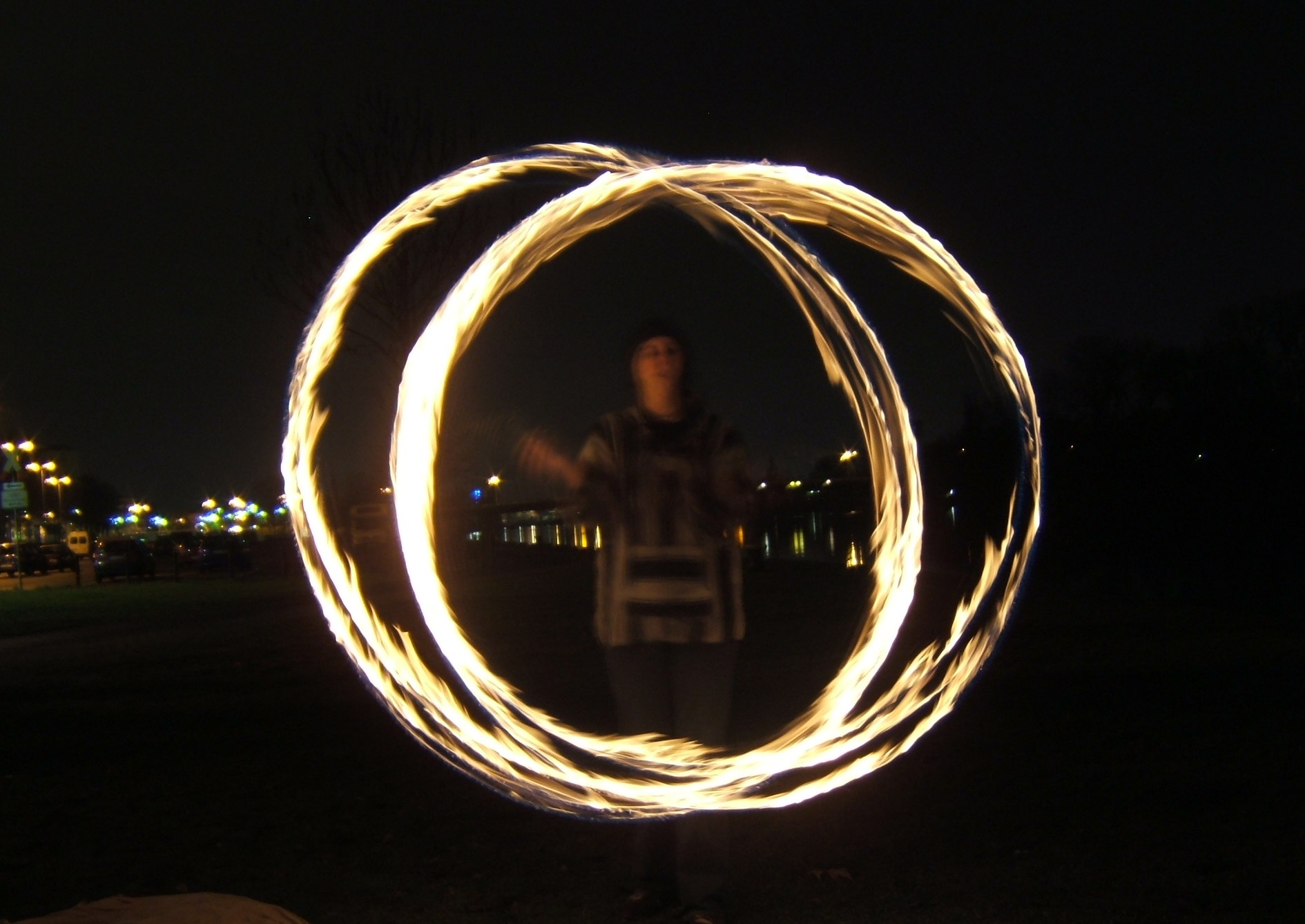
Jwibul

Sticks are placed in the can, and the fire is lit. The wire is then held with one hand and swirled vigorously so that the fuel in the can burns. Children spin cans and compete over whose fire burns better. The use of fire cans has been replacing the use of torches or a straw bundles; thus playing the fire-can can be understood as a type of jwibul.

== Jwibullori in Jeju ==
In Jeju Island, people set a fire in the rangeland of the mountain Hallasan during the month of February, or Hwaip (화입). The area calls rats "daughter-in-law" because if you call a mouse a "mouse", it will understand and be trouble. Another custom warns against displaying a divination sign on the day of the mouse, and another avoids starching clothes. As jwibullori is related to rats, it is the same as burning a field on the first day of the first lunar month. Depending on the region, it is also known as jwibul (쥐불) in conjunction with the moon torchlight on New Year's Eve. To prevent fire, jwibullori is not allowed. Disease and pests are exterminated using pesticide instead of fire, so jwibullori is gradually disappearing.

== Jwibullori in China ==
Bul (불놀이, mean: Displaying fireworks) on the 15th day of the New Year is derived from the idea of Sunghwa (숭화; 崇火) which reveres fire. In southern China and Europe as well as Korea, farmers practice of burning fields is associated with their products. In China, a hunchung (훈충; 燻蟲) event called Yongdaedu (용대두; 龍擡頭) takes place on February 2. On this holiday a dragon raises his head. It is said that it is possible to prevent various insect disasters if it goes out of the kitchen door, spraying the ashes like a dragon.

== Pyeongchang commemorative coins ==
Pyeongchang commemorative coins are engraved with jwibullori. The currency issued to commemorate the PyeongChang Olympic Games is divided into commemorative bills and commemorative coins. Jwibullori are engraved on gold coins. The gold coins are also engraved with traditional play paintings such as mono maple sled.
