= List of Squid Game characters =

Fictional characters

Squid Game (Korean: 오징어 게임; RR: Ojingeo geim) is a South Korean survival drama series created by Hwang Dong-hyuk for Netflix. The series revolves around a secret contest where 456 players, all of whom are in deep financial hardship, risk their lives to play a series of deadly children's games for the chance to win a ₩45.6 billion won prize (100 million per person eliminated).

The first season of the series features an ensemble cast including Lee Jung-jae, Park Hae-soo, Jung Ho-yeon, Wi Ha-joon, O Yeong-su, Heo Sung-tae, Anupam Tripathi, Kim Joo-ryoung, Lee Byung-hun and Lee Seo-hwan. For the second season, a new ensemble cast is introduced including Yim Si-wan, Kang Ha-neul, Lee Jin-wook, Park Sung-hoon, Choi Seung-hyun (T.O.P.), Yang Dong-geun, Jo Yu-ri, Kang Ae-shim and Park Gyu-young with Lee Jung-jae, Wi Ha-joon, Lee Byung-hun and Lee Seo-hwan reprising their roles from season one.

== Overview ==
Character	Actor	Appearances		
Character	Actor	Season 1	Season 2	Season 3
Main characters
Seong Gi-hun / Player 456	Lee Jung-jae	Main	Main	Main
Cho Sang-woo / Player 218	Park Hae-soo	Main	Special Guest	
The Front Man / Hwang In-ho / Player 001 / Player 132	Lee Byung-hun	Main	Main	Main
Oh Il-nam / Player 001	O Yeong-su	Main		Guest
Detective Hwang Jun-ho	Wi Ha-joon	Recurring	Main	Main
Kang Sae-byeok / Player 067	Jung Ho-yeon	Main	Special Guest	Special Guest
Jang Deok-su / Player 101	Heo Sung-tae	Main		
Ali Abdul / Player 199	Anupam Tripathi	Main		
Han Mi-nyeo / Player 212	Kim Joo-ryoung	Main		
Choi Woo-seok	Jeon Seok-ho		Main	Main
Kang No-eul / Guard 011	Park Gyu-young		Main	Main
Park Jung-bae / Player 390	Lee Seo-hwan	Guest	Main	Guest
Park Yong-sik / Player 007	Yang Dong-geun		Main	Main
Jang Geum-ja / Player 149	Kang Ae-shim		Main	Main
Lee Myung-gi / MG Coin / Player 333	Im Si-wan		Main	Main
Kim Jun-hee / Player 222	Jo Yu-ri		Main	Main
Choi Su-bong / Thanos / Player 230	Choi Seung-hyun		Main	Guest
Im Jeong-dae / Player 100	Song Young-chang		Main	Main
Kang Dae-ho / Player 388	Kang Ha-neul		Main	Main
Seon-nyeo / Player 044	Chae Kook-hee		Main	Main
Park Gyeong-seok / Player 246	Lee Jin-wook		Main	Main
Cho Hyun-ju / Player 120	Park Sung-hoon		Main	Main
Nam-gyu / Player 124	Roh Jae-won		Main	Main
Park Min-su / Player 125	Lee David		Main	Main
Recurring characters
Byeong-gi / Player 111	Yoo Sung-joo	Recurring		
Ji-yeong / Player 240	Lee Yoo-mi	Recurring		
Gi-hun's mother	Kim Young-ok	Recurring		
Sang-woo's mother	Park Hye-jin	Recurring	Guest	Guest
Kang Eun-ji	Kang Mal-geum	Recurring	Guest	
Seong Ga-yeong	Cho Ah-in	Recurring	Voice	Guest
Kang Cheol	Park Si-wan	Recurring	Guest	Guest
Se-mi / Player 380	Won Ji-an		Recurring	Guest
Kim Young-mi / Player 095	Kim Si-eun		Recurring	
Captain Park	Oh Dal-su		Recurring	Recurring
Guest characters
The Recruiter	Gong Yoo	Special Guest	Guest	Photo
Mr. Kim	Kim Pub-lae	Guest	Guest	
Kang Mi-na / Player 196	Song Ji-woo		Guest	
The American Recruiter	Cate Blanchett			Special Guest

== Main characters ==
=== Central characters ===
==== Seong Gi-hun ====
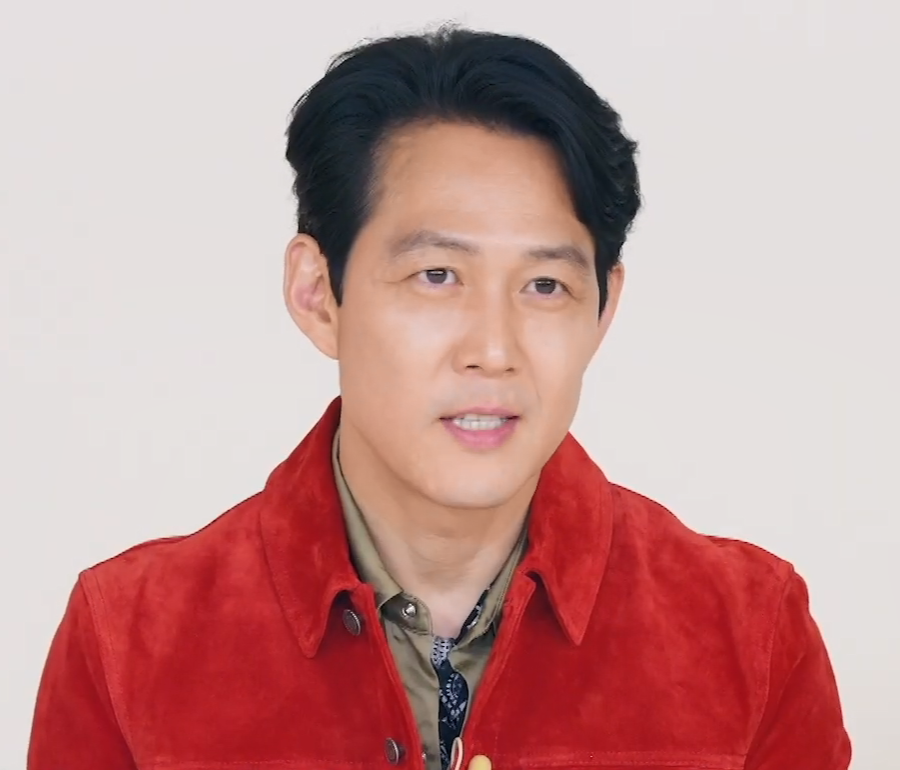
Gi-hun is portrayed by Lee Jung-jae, pictured here in September 2021

Seong Gi-hun, also known as Player 456, is the main protagonist of Squid Game. He is portrayed by Lee Jung-jae. Gi-hun is a gambler down on his luck who gets recruited to play in the Squid Game, a series of deadly childhood games (including "Red Light, Green Light", "Marbles", "Tug of war" and the eponymous Squid game), for a high cash prize, which he ultimately wins. In the second season, he returns to the game to end it. Gi-hun was based on one of the childhood friends of series creator Hwang Dong-hyuk. Gi-hun and Cho Sang-woo were based on Hwang's own personal experiences and represented "two sides" of himself; Gi-hun shared the same aspects of being raised by an economically disadvantaged single mother in the Ssangmun district of Seoul, while Sang-woo reflected on Hwang having attended Seoul National University with high expectations from his family and neighborhood. Hwang said he chose to cast Lee as Gi-hun as to "destroy his charismatic image portrayed in his previous roles".

Gi-hun and his portrayal by Lee Jung-jae has received critical acclaim. The New York Times named him their breakout star of 2021; stating: "As the protagonist Seong Gi-hun, a gambling addict who is deeply in debt, he gives a wrenching and surprisingly subtle performance as he battles his way through unspeakable horrors." For his performance in the first season, he was nominated for numerous accolades, including the Critics' Choice Television Award for Best Actor in a Drama Series, the Golden Globe Award for Best Actor – Television Series Drama, and the Screen Actors Guild Award for Outstanding Performance by a Male Actor in a Drama Series, making him the first male actor from Asia and Korea to receive individual nominations in those categories across all three awards shows with his win for the latter and co-star Jung Ho-yeon winning the respective female award making history for the show becoming the first non-English language television series to win at the SAG Awards. He was also nominated along with his costars for the Screen Actors Guild Award for Outstanding Performance by an Ensemble in a Drama Series.

Born on October 31, 1974, Gi-hun is a resident from the Ssangmun-dong neighborhood in the city of Seoul, the capital of South Korea. 10 years after losing his job at an automobile manufacturing plant run by Dragon Motors, he is a divorced father, who besides working as a chauffeur, continuously gambles for the purpose of earning money. Living with his diabetic mother, and upon learning that his daughter Seong Ga-yeong, who along with her mother and stepdad, will be moving to America, Gi-hun desperately wants to gain custody. Gi-hun often borrows money from his mother, the bank, as well as from loan sharks. Due to his excessive gambling and other different factors, Gi-hun is millions of won in debt, and constantly evades paying back the money he owes to the bank and loan sharks.

One day after winning 100.000 won playing Ddakji with a salesman, Gi-hun gets invited to the Squid Game, an offer he accepts in hopes of winning a large amount of money, paying back his large debts, paying his mother's hospital bills, gaining back custody of his daughter and overall securing a good life for him and his family. Throughout the game, Gi-hun forms an alliance with Cho Sang-woo, a childhood friend of his, Kang Sae-byeok, a North Korean defector, Ali Abdul (who saved Gi-hun's life during "Red Light, Green Light") and Oh Il-nam, an elderly man. However, due to Cho Sang-woo's willingness to let other players die to further advance in the game, he and Gi-hun become rivals, competing against each other in the final, eponymous squid game. Gi-hun beats Sang-woo in the final game but refuses to kill him, offering him a chance to use the game's third clause to save his friend's life. However, Sang-woo commits suicide by stabbing himself in the neck, allowing Gi-hun to win the competition. As a final request before his death, Sang-woo asks Gi-hun to use some of the prize winnings to help his mother. Gi-hun is heartbroken at Sang-woo's death.

As the winner, Gi-hun receives the prize money and returns to Seoul, but discovers his mother had died and mourns over her body. Gi-hun is left emotionally traumatized from what he went through during the game, living out his old life and not spending any of his winnings. A year later, in December 2021, Gi-hun receives a card from "his gganbu" instructing him to visit a skyscraper. Gi-hun comes upon Il-nam, thought to have died in the games, alive but lying in his deathbed, and is horrified and disgusted at Il-nam's revelation that he created the Squid Game. After Gi-hun wins Il-nam's bet regarding a homeless man outside, Il-nam passes away. Following this, Gi-hun dyes his hair red, puts Sae-byeok's brother in the care of Sang-woo's mother and gives her a suitcase containing a large portion of the prize money. Gi-hun then decides to board a flight to Los Angeles to see his daughter but notices the same salesman he originally encountered at the subway playing ddakji with another player. Gi-hun runs to the other side of the platform and takes the invitation card from the player, then calls the number himself, stating that he cannot forgive the organizers for everything they have done. After the Front Man tells him to "just get on that plane", Gi-hun turns around and walks away to try and take down the game's organizers.

Two years later, Gi-hun has been searching for the Recruiter relentlessly. They eventually meet and play a game of Russian Roulette, in which the Recruiter dies and Gi-hun finds a card in his jacket. The card leads him to a party where a pink guard takes him to a limo where he talks to the Front Man, asking him to return to the game. Gi-hun returns to the game and warns the players in the "Red Light, Green Light" game, helping most of them survive. He notices a player wounded, so he tried to help him but the player was shot by Kang No-eul. He then tries to convince the players to vote to leave the games but half of them, notably Im Jeong-dae, Kim Yeong-sam and Thanos, voted to stay. Thanos stated and mocked Gi-hun about giving them tips on how to win and Gi-hun hesitates. He was disappointed when the next game wasn't the dalgona causing Jeong-dae and Yeong-sam to scold him. He then plays a six-legged pentathlon, which Gi-hun and his team Park Jung-bae, another best friend of Gi-hun, Kim Jun-hee, a pregnant girl who needed money on the job, Kang Dae-ho, an ex-marine, and Oh Young-il, who is Hwang In-ho in disguise narrowly win, and a pairs game, which he also survives. Before a fight breaks out between players wanting to continue the games and those trying to end them early, Gi-hun and his team come up with a plan to end the game, starting a riot in attempting to capture the Masked Officer. After Thanos's death and despite initial success, the plan fails and he is captured and confronted by the Front Man and the Masked Officer, who asks him if it was worth it and kills Jung-bae, leaving Gi-hun devastated once again.

He starts off in season 3 chained to one of the bunk beds and forced to abstain from voting, staring Dae-ho down and blaming him for the rebellion's failure and attempts to strangle Seon-nyeo for mocking his failed rebellion. In the fourth game, Keys and Knives, Gi-hun is assigned the role of a seeker, and spends the entire game hunting Dae-ho down. He moves on to the next round by strangling Dae-ho and killing him, but not before being struck by regret moments after taking Dae-ho's life and attempting to commit suicide only to be physically restrained by the guards.

Between games four and five, Geum-ja asks him to protect and take care of Jun-hee and her baby. Despite his initial refusal, he becomes determined to do it as Geum-ja hangs herself that very night. In the fifth game, Jump Rope, Gi-hun is the second person to cross the bridge (the first being Nam-gyu, who ended up dead) with Jun-hee's baby in hand. After successfully crossing the bridge, he tells Jun-hee that he will come back for her after killing player who intended to block the bridge, but Jun-hee convinces him not to as she wants to ensure her baby's survival and has suffered an ankle sprain that will make it impossible for her to continue.

With Jun-hee dead, Gi-hun becomes one of the nine finalists of the second season, protecting the baby from the other finalists who desire to kill her in order to win even more money. The night before the final game, Gi-hun is called in by the Front Man, who offers him a knife to kill the other finalists and guarantee his and the baby's survival. He plans to do it, but a hallucination of Sae-byeok stops him from harming anyone.

During the sixth game, Sky Squid Game, he, the baby and Park Min-su are the three obvious targets for the rest of the finalists, but Gi-hun strives to protect the baby from them. The final round begins with only him, the baby, and Lee Myung-gi (the baby's biological father) still alive. As the two men fight, Myung-gi threatens to kill his own daughter. He ultimately falls off the platform and dies; however, since no one pressed the button to start the round, his death does not count as an elimination. Gi-hun realizes that either he or the baby must die in order to end the game with a winner. He chooses to kill himself by deliberately falling off the platform, leaving the baby as the winner, fulfilling his goal to save the baby and Gyeong-seok.

Six months later, the Front Man visits Gi-hun's daughter in Los Angeles to inform her of his death and to give her his bloodstained track suit and the remainder of his winnings.

==== The Front Man / Hwang In-ho ====
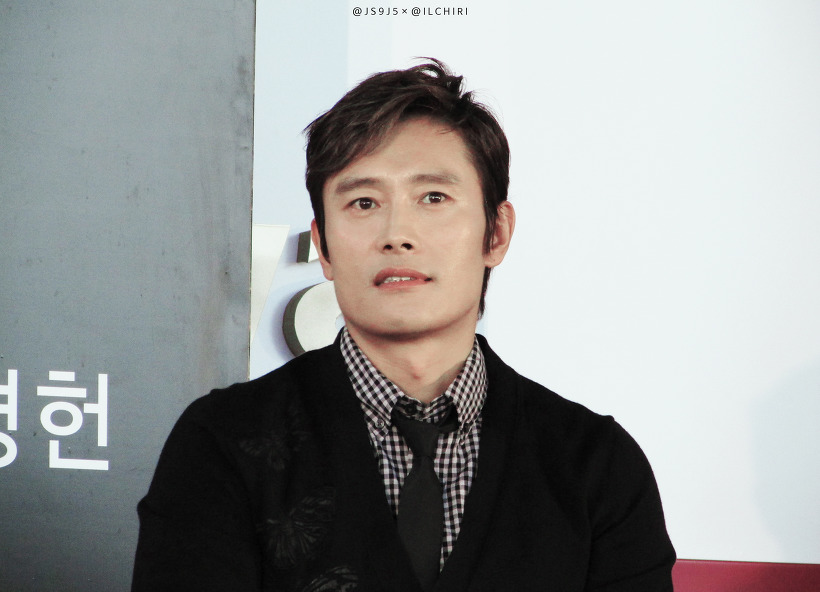
The Front Man / Hwang In-ho is portrayed by Lee Byung-hun

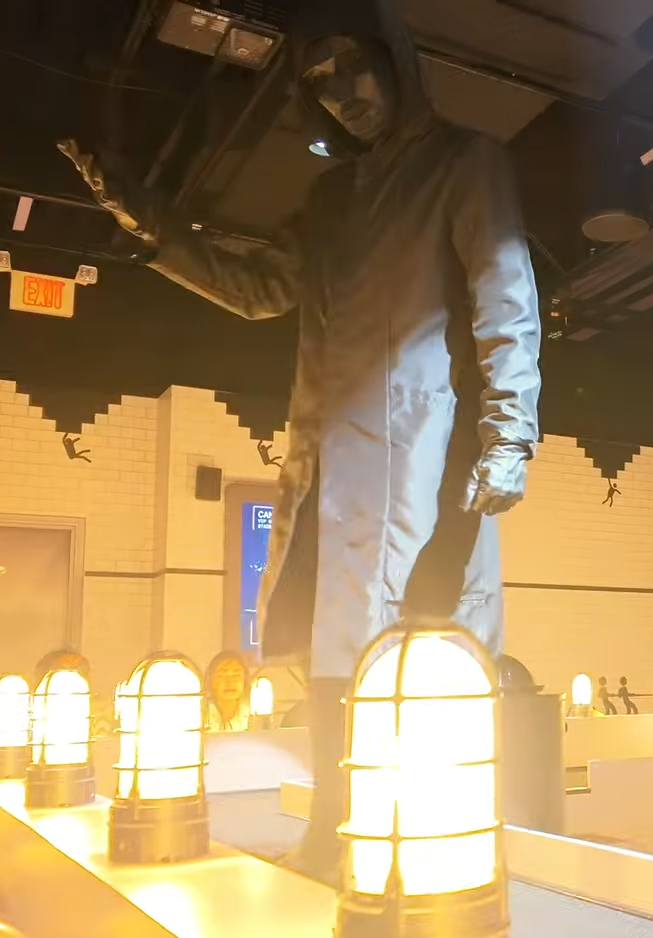
Performer dressed as the Front Man in Netflix House, Dallas

Hwang In-ho, also known as the Front Man and later posing as Player 001 in the second season, is the main antagonist of the Squid Game series. He is portrayed by Lee Byung-hun.

The Front Man is the initially mysterious overseer of the games. He wears a black mask and clothing and is seen watching the games unfold in lavish quarters, enjoying music and entering the game arenas only when absolutely necessary. In the 2020 games, he executes a guard for revealing his face at gunpoint. He later discovers that Jun-ho, an officer with the Korean National Police, has infiltrated the island where the games are held and impersonated a guard.

In-ho was alerted by a conspiracy of Player 111, Byeong-gi, being supported by a group of guards for organ trafficking, which breaks the rules of the game as guards are not permitted to help players. He then presents himself to Byeong-gi and executes him and the rogue guards. In-ho displays Byeong-gi's corpse and the guards hunged up for the players to see the consequences of violating the rules of the games.

When the VIPs arrive on the island to watch the games, the Front Man stands in for the unseen "host" of the games. During the fifth game, which challenges players to cross a bridge made of regular glass and tempered glass, In-ho notices a player using his previous knowledge of glass manufacturing to inspect the panels. The Front Man turns out the lights to remove the advantage. Shortly afterward, he notices a VIP is missing and orders a search. The VIP is found unconscious, and the Front Man realizes the intruder has impersonated a waiter.

He pursues Jun-ho through the games' archives and sends several soldiers after him, eventually confronting him on a cliff, where Jun-ho reveals he is a police officer and has sent evidence of the games to his superior. The Front Man responds with skepticism, since the island is out of reach of cell phone towers, and offers to spare Jun-ho's life if he surrenders and deletes the evidence. Jun-ho refuses and shoots the Front Man in the shoulder, who then reveals himself to be In-ho, Jun-ho's older brother who had disappeared years ago after joining the games. Jun-ho assumed he had been killed, but recently discovered In-ho was actually the victor of his games.

In-ho again asks Jun-ho to come with him, but the younger brother refuses and In-ho shoots him. Jun-ho says, " "In-ho ... why?" before falling off the cliff and into the sea. Afterwards, In-ho is haunted by a vision of his brother in the mirror of his apartment, repeating the question.

When the 2020 games conclude, In-ho is next seen in a limousine with the victor, Seong Gi-hun (Lee Jung-jae), after Cho Sang-woo's death (Park Sae-hoo). He congratulates Gi-hun on his victory and explains the game is essentially a horse race, then tells Gi-hun to think of the game like a dream. On December 25, 2021, following the death of the Host, Oh Il-nam, In-ho pays his respects and likely takes over his role as the Host. Some time later, Gi-hun is preparing to go to the U.S. to be with his daughter but encounters the salesman who had recruited him to the games and uses his calling card to contact the Front Man. In-ho tells him to get on the plane for his own good, but Gi-hun refuses and declares his intention to find and destroy him.

Two years later, the Front Man has become aware of Gi-hun's determined efforts to find the salesman who recruited him. He eventually confronts Gi-hun and accepts his challenge to re-enter the games in order to stop the game from the inside by proving humanity's true nature isn't toxic like what he claimed. After observing the first game where Gi-Hun directs players to survive the Red-Light Green-Light round, In-Ho eventually decides to infiltrate the games as Player 001 so that he can more easily manipulate the players and prove Gi-hun wrong while sending his successor, the Masked Officer, in charge of the games.

To create warring factions among the players, the Front Man introduces voting (in favor of ending the games and splitting the money evenly or letting them continue) after each game. As Player 001, he casts the deciding vote in favor of continuing, but still manages to befriend Gi-hun after opposing Im Jeong-dae and join his team. He fabricates a story, based in truth, about his reason for being in the games—his pregnant wife is desperately ill, and they are deeply in debt due to her medical bills. In the second game, In-ho fails at one of the team's tasks, seemingly on purpose to toy with the others, but still helps them to succeed by completing the task just in time. In the third game, Jung-bae witnesses In-ho savagely kill another player to save the two of them.

Before the next game begins, In-ho and Gi-hun agree not to attempt to persuade more players to their side to avoid any violence among the groups. He agrees to join Gi-hun's rebellion against the games, aiding his group in overpowering the guards and using their weapons to try to reach the control room for the games. In-ho ultimately turns on them, however, killing two other players and faking his own death, then appearing as the Front Man with the Masked Officer before Gi-hun and Jung-bae. He asks Gi-hun if he enjoyed playing the hero before executing Jung-bae and leaving them both.

In-ho is seen spectating Gi-hun screaming in agony about the failed rebellion and begging for death. He is called by Captain Park, and instructs him to kill the mercenaries and Jun-ho. He sends the Masked Officer to finish the files of the rebellion whilst he welcomes the VIPS. He watches Gi-hun and Dae-ho's conflict and Gi-hun thriving with Jun-hee's baby to the final game. In the night, he welcomes Gi-hun to his main room, where is takes of his mask to reveal himself as Young-il and apologising about Jung-bae. In-ho gives him a knife to kill the other finalists to survive and asks him if he still has faith in people's lives. He watches Gi-hun refrains from killing the finalists and the final game. In-ho concludes the games and sets the evacuation system to destroy the island. He picks up Jun-hee's baby after Gi-hun's death and is confronted by Jun-ho and leaves.

Six months later, In-ho turns the baby and her winnings over to Jun-ho, delivers Gi-hun's bloody track suit and the remainder of his winnings to his daughter Ga-yeong in Los Angeles, and informs her of his death. While stopped at a traffic light, In-ho sees an American recruiter playing ddakji with a homeless man; the two stare at each other for a moment before his limousine pulls away.

==== Hwang Jun-ho ====
Hwang Jun-ho
- Squid Game character
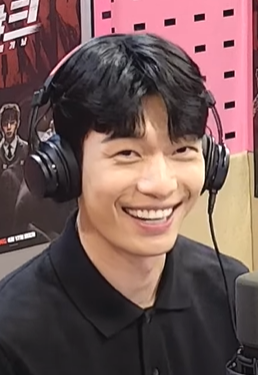
- Wi Ha-joon, the actor that plays Hwang Jun-ho, in 2021
- First appearance: "Hell" (2021)
- Last appearance: " Humans Are..." (2025)
- Created by: Hwang Dong-hyuk
- Portrayed by: Wi Ha-joon
- Voiced by: Donald Chang (English)

In-universe information
- Aliases: Captain Hwang; Detective Hwang
- Occupation: Detective (formerly); Traffic cop (formerly)
- Family: Front Man (half-brother); Park Mal-soon (step-mother)
- Children: Kim Jun-hee's baby (adoptive daughter)
- Nationality: South Korean
- Date of birth: September 16, 1992

Hwang Jun-ho (Korean: 황준호; IPA: [ɸwa̠ŋ t͡ɕun ɸʷo̞]) is portrayed by Wi Ha-joon.

Jun-ho is a South Korean police detective who is searching for his missing half-brother, In-ho. When Seong Gi-hun (Lee Jung-jae) explains his experience in the first game to the police, Jun-ho is the only one who does not react with skepticism. He later discovers evidence that his long-missing brother took part in the games, after finding the same Squid Game business card Gi-hun left at the police station in his brother's abandoned apartment room, so decides to infiltrate the games to try to find him.

Jun-ho stows away on a ferry to the island where the games occur and poses as a guard. He records several events from the games on his cell phone with the intent of delivering this evidence to his skeptical boss and colleagues. After a higher-level guard is killed, Jun-ho takes his place and discreetly asks Gi-hun if he has heard of a player named In-ho. Gi-hun responds by saying the players do not know each other's real names.

He later gets caught up in an organ trafficking plot which the guard he initially took the identity of was part of, and believes his brother died in the games as the corrupt guards who were trafficking player's organs mentioned a player acting like a 'zombie' with only one kidney. Jun-ho believed this was his brother as he had previously given Jun-ho one of his kidneys. Although this was just a coincidence, Jun-ho shoots one of the guards, Number 28, dead in a fit of rage.

Jun-ho manages to sneak into the Front Man (played by Lee Byung-hun)'s office room on the island, where he discovers a vast archive of past players and winners and is surprised to find out that his brother won the games in 2015. He narrowly avoids being found by the Front Man and disguises himself as a waiter to the sadistic VIPs who watch and bet on the games. He ends up being sexually assaulted by one of them, and uses the opportunity to take him to a private room and force him at gunpoint to reveal everything he knows about the games on camera. He leaves the VIP unconscious and attempts to flee the island, convinced he has all the evidence he needs, briefly being spotted by the Front Man as he leaves.

The Front Man and the guards ultimately corner Jun-ho on a cliff, where Jun-ho identifies himself as a police officer and says that he has sent evidence of the games to his superior, despite there being no signal on the island. The Front Man is skeptical and offers to spare Jun-ho if he hands over his phone and gun and deletes the evidence. Jun-ho responds by shooting him in the shoulder and demanding to know who he is. The Front Man then removes his mask and reveals himself as his brother, In-ho. He again offers to save Jun-ho, but he refuses and In-ho aims his gun at his brother who asks, "In-ho…why?" In-ho shoots him in the shoulder, causing him to fall off the cliff and into the ocean. Later, In-ho is shown to be haunted by his brother's last words to him.

Jun-ho survives his fall off the cliff, being saved by Captain Park, a fisherman. Jun-ho, with Captain Park, has been searching for the game island for two years, without success. He has given up his job investigating major crimes and became a traffic police officer, leading him to investigate and find Gi-hun. The two talk and team up to end the game for good, as Jun-ho's superiors at the police station still do not believe the Squid Games exist due to lack of evidence. Jun-ho agrees to help Gi-hun in his plan to catch the Front Man, as does Choi Woo-seok, who has formed a team of mercenaries. The attempt fails and Gi-hun decides to re-enter the games, with a tracker implanted in one of his teeth so the team can pinpoint his location. However, the tracker is taken from him and they are unable to immediately find the island where the games are taking place. Jun-ho and the team search different islands. On one of them, they see a possible entrance, but it explodes when they open it. Back on the boat, Jun-ho refuses to go back until he finds the island, although Captain Park turns out to be an infiltrator and sabotages them numerous times.

Jun-ho eventually kills Park and finds his way to the correct island, but not before the games have ended and In-ho has activated a self-destruct system. He confronts In-ho, who ignores him and departs with Kim Jun-hee's baby (the winner), and escapes the island just before it explodes. Six months later, after leaving the police force, he discovers that In-ho has left both the baby and her winnings in his care.

=== Introduced in Season 1 ===
==== Cho Sang-woo ====
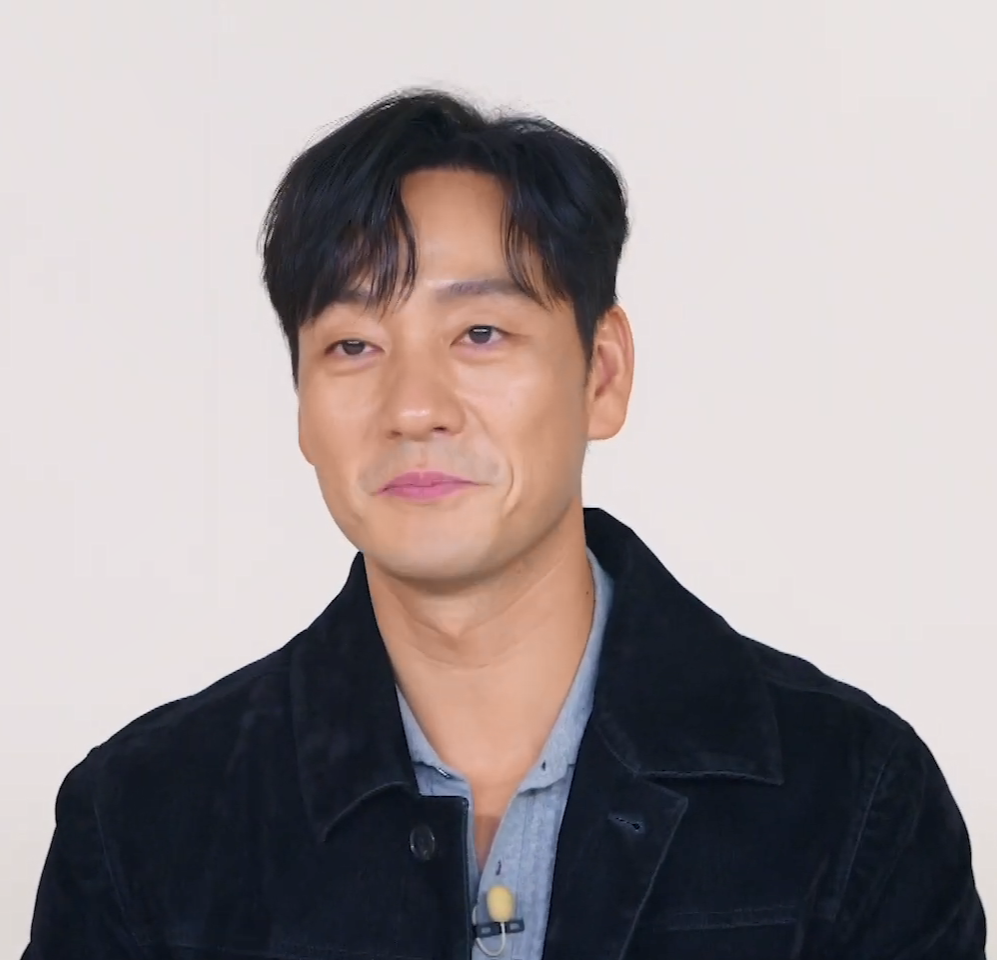
Park Hae-soo portrayed Cho Sang-woo

Cho Sang-woo, also known as Player 218, is portrayed by Park Hae-soo. Sang-woo is the childhood friend of series protagonist Seong Gi-hun, and a graduate of Seoul National University. While working at an investment firm, Sang-woo stole money from his clients, suffered investment losses, and became millions of won in debt. To solve his financial problems, Sang-woo participated in the Squid Game. Initially allied with Gi-hun and several other players, he takes on a darker role as the series progresses, becoming willing to kill other players to ensure his own survival. Sang-woo was based on one of the childhood friends of series creator Hwang Dong-hyuk. Sang-woo and Gi-hun were based on Hwang's own personal experiences and represented "two sides" of himself; Gi-hun shared the same aspects of being raised by an economically disadvantaged single mother in the Ssangmun district of Seoul, while Sang-woo reflected on Hwang having attended Seoul National University with high expectations from his family and neighborhood.

As children, Sang-woo and Seong Gi-hun would often play children's games together, such as Squid. Sang-woo later attended Seoul National University, and graduated at the top of his class. According to Gi-hun, Sang-woo's graduation from SNU caused him to become a famous prodigy in the Ssangmun-dong neighbourhood in the city of Seoul, the capital of South Korea. After graduating from SNU, Sang-woo became the leader of an investment team at the securities company Joy Investments. He illegally siphoned money from his client's balances, then invested it in derivatives and future options which failed, resulting in the loss of 6 billion won. He also used his mother's house and store as collateral for his illegal activities. He then gets recruited to play in a series of deadly childhood games, and is re-united with Gi-hun. After learning that participants who lose are killed, Sang-woo gave Gi-hun advice on how to survive "Red Light, Green Light" by informing him that the doll is a motion sensor. After both Sang-woo and Gi-hun survive the game, the majority of players want to quit, horrified at the revelation of players who lose being killed. When the masked staff members repeat the first two contract conditions, Sang-woo took the initiative for conducting a vote among the contestants to end the Squid Game. However, he ultimately decided to continue participating when he learned that the prize money for winning was 45.6 billion won. After the games were stopped by the majority vote, his heavy debts almost led him to suicide before having been offered the chance to rejoin the Squid Game, which he accepts.

During the Squid Game, Sang-woo helped Gi-hun and others in their alliance, particularly befriending Ali Abdul. However, to ensure his own survival, he became frequently more ruthless and inconsiderate as the game progressed. Sang-woo resorted to manipulation to win the Marbles game, betraying Ali and leaving him to die. He later murdered Player 017 in the Glass Stepping Stones game. After killing Kang Sae-byeok to prevent her and Gi-hun from ending the game, Sang-woo is one of two players to make it into the final round of the competition, along with Gi-hun. The two face off in the eponymous Squid game, in which, after an intense battle between the two, Gi-hun won after Sang-woo was too weak to continue. Before claiming his victory, Gi-hun attempts to end the game by invoking clause 3 of the consent form, hoping to end the game and save his friend's life. Aware that ending the game will result in forfeiture of the prize money and leave no money for his mother, Sang-woo commits suicide by stabbing himself in the neck, allowing Gi-hun to win the game. As a final request before his death, Sang-woo asks Gi-hun to use some of the prize winnings to help his mother. Sang-woo's request to Gi-hun is fulfilled after he gives a large portion of his winnings to Sang-woo's mother, and also puts Kang Cheol (Sae-byeok's younger brother) in her care, offering both of them a better life. In Season 2, it is revealed that his mother named the fish shop after him, called "Sang Woo's Fish Store".

Park received international fame for his role as Sang-woo, and was able to gain over 800,000 Instagram followers in a single day due to the success of the series.

==== Kang Sae-byeok ====
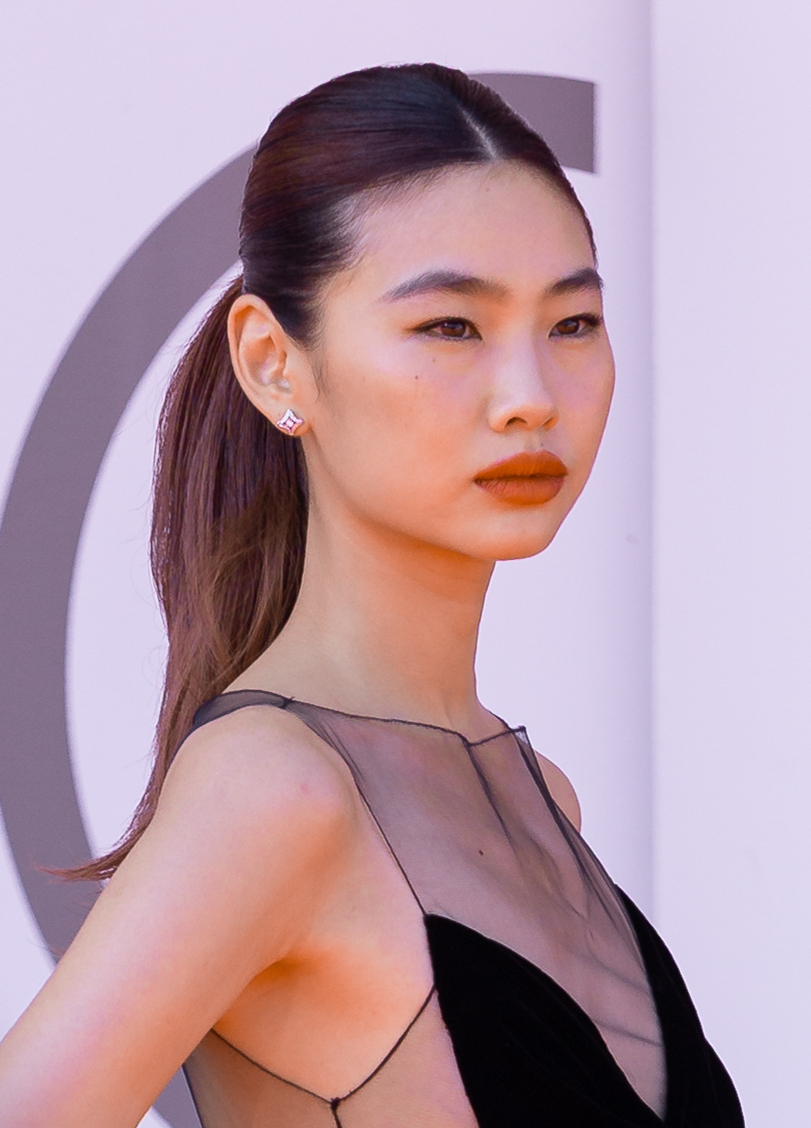
Kang Sae-byeok is portrayed by Jung Ho-yeon

Kang Sae-byeok, also known as Player 067, is portrayed by model Jung Ho-yeon in her acting debut. She studied for her role by practicing Hamgyŏng dialect with real North Korean defectors, watching documentaries about North Korean defectors, and learning martial arts. She also drew upon her own feelings of loneliness while modeling overseas to build the character, and wrote a daily diary from Sae-byeok's perspective.

Sae-byeok is a North Korean defector and pickpocket. She originally had grandparents, parents and an older brother, but an epidemic in her native village killed her grandparents and older brother. Her father was shot by the North Korean guards while fleeing the border into China and her mother was captured somewhere in China and repatriated back to North Korea, where she was imprisoned in a prison camp. At one point, Sae-byeok worked for gangster Jang Deok-su but later became independent from him, causing animosity between the two.

Sae-byeok agrees to participate in the Squid Game to raise enough money to help reunite her family and get her younger brother Kang Cheol out of the orphanage. Initially entering the game as a lone wolf, she later allies herself with Seong Gi-hun, who welcomes her on his team despite Sae-byeok pickpocketing him in the past, and his other teammates. She also forms an alliance with Ji-yeong, who sacrifices herself for Sae-byeok during the Marbles game. In the Glass Bridge game, Sae-byeok crosses safely but is impaled by a piece of the exploding glass. Sae-byeok becomes one of the three finalists, alongside Gi-hun and Cho Sang-woo. Before the sixth and final game, Sae-byeok asks Gi-hun to look after her family if she does not make it out of the game alive. Her injury worsens, and she is killed by Sang-woo shortly afterwards to prevent Gi-hun from ending the game to save her life. After winning the game following Sang-woo's suicide, Gi-hun fulfils his promise to Sae-byeok by putting Kang Cheol in the care of Sang-woo's mother.

Although Sae-byeok does not appear in season 2 due to her death, aside from a nightmare sequence, Gi-Hun continues to watch over Kang Cheol with Sang-Woo's mother for 2 years until Gi-Hun gets a recent news of the location of Sae-byeok and Cheol's mother, who also recently escaped North Korea, in which he request the broker to contact him (or Sang-Woo's mother) in a moment of notice upon her mother's retrieval.

Jung was called Squid Game's breakout star by critics. For her performance, she won the Screen Actors Guild Award for Outstanding Performance by a Female Actor in a Drama Series at the 28th Screen Actors Guild Awards. This nomination made her the second actress of Asian as well as Korean descent to receive an individual SAG Award nomination. Her win, along with Lee Jung-jae winning the respective male award, made history for the show becoming the first non-English language television series to win at the SAG Awards. She was also nominated along with her costars for the Screen Actors Guild Award for Outstanding Performance by an Ensemble in a Drama Series.

==== Oh Il-nam ====
Oh Il-nam
- Squid Game character
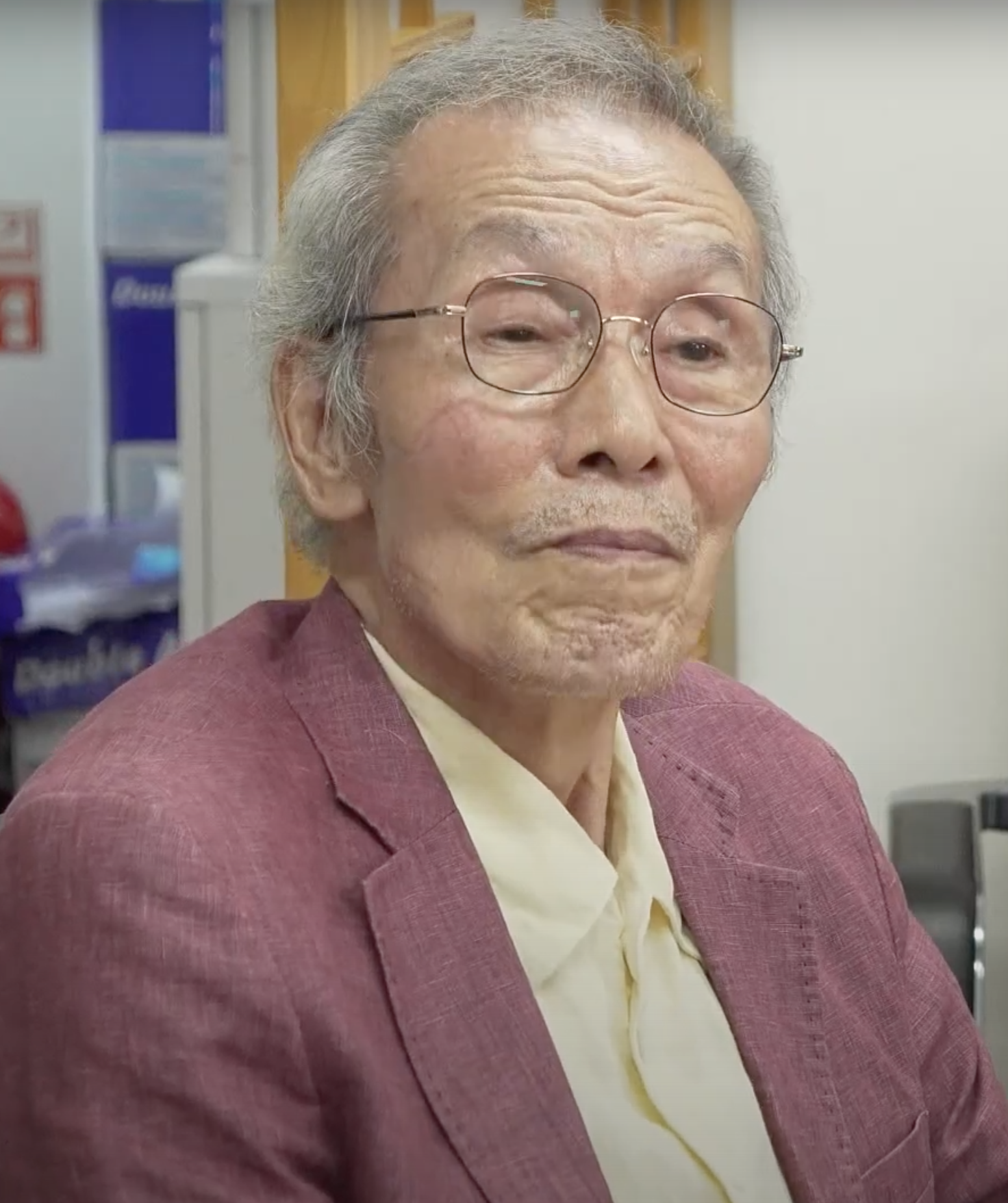
- O Yeong-su, Player 001 s actor, pictured in 2022
- First appearance: "Red Light, Green Light" (2021)
- Last appearance: "○△□" (2025)
- Created by: Hwang Dong-hyuk
- Portrayed by: O Yeong-su
- Voiced by: Hideo Kimura (English)

In-universe information
- Aliases: The Host; Player 001; Old Man
- Occupation: Financial Tycoon

Oh Il-nam, also known as Player 001, portrayed by O Yeong-su, is the overarching antagonist of Squid Game, and the primary antagonist of the first season.

Il-nam is initially presented as an elderly man with a brain tumor and dementia, who prefers playing the game than to await death in the outside world. During the game, Il-nam forms a close alliance with Gi-hun, and survives the first three games before being seemingly killed off-screen during the Marbles game, voluntarily giving his final marble to Gi-hun for safety.

However, a year after Gi-hun wins the game, it is revealed that Il-nam survived and that he was secretly the creator/host of the games, angering Gi-hun. Il-nam explains his reasoning for creating the games to Gi-hun, namely that he had lost the ability to enjoy life due to his immense wealth and lost faith in humanity, and that he decided to join this game out of boredom, knowing it would be the final one he would oversee. However, he states that he genuinely enjoyed playing the game with Gi-hun. Il-nam then dies of his cancer, but not before making a final bet with Gi-hun.

O Yeong-su won the Golden Globe award for Best Supporting Actor in a TV Series in 2022 for his portrayal of Oh Il-nam. He makes a flashback appearance in the penultimate episode of season 3, during a 2015 meeting with In-ho (then a game finalist).

==== Ali Abdul ====
Ali Abdul, also known as Player 199, is portrayed by Anupam Tripathi.

Ali is a Pakistani migrant worker who moved to South Korea with his wife and child, joining the games to win prize money for his family, especially after being cheated out of his earnings by his corrupt boss. Despite his hardships, Ali remains optimistic and refuses to harbor bitterness. He saves Seong Gi-hun's life during the "Red Light, Green Light" game by stopping his fall, and later forms an alliance with Gi-hun and his team. Ali survives the first three games but is killed during the Marbles game after being betrayed by Cho Sang-woo, who replaces his pouch of marbles with pebbles. Ali's death is regarded as one of the heartbreaking moments in the series, as he had become a fan favorite.

In an article for National Public Radio, Benazir Samad wrote that in Pakistan, regarding the depiction of the character, "There's no shortage of opinions."

==== Jang Deok-su ====
Jang Deok-su, also known as Player 101, is portrayed by Heo Sung-tae.

Deok-su is a ruthless gangster who entered the game to settle massive gambling debts, having an acrimonious past with Kang Sae-byeok and fallen out of favor with his crime boss. He forms and breaks alliances as needed, becoming the leader of his own faction of players, but believes it is every player for themselves during the competition, even resorting to cheating to win. Deok-su betrays allies such as Han Mi-nyeo, whom he develops a sexual relationship with, and Player 278, his right-hand man. He is also directly responsible of the murder of player 271, whom he kills for extra food, after which he realizes riots are allowed during sleeping hours, resulting in the deaths of several other players. Despite his tough demeanor, Deok-su is actually a coward, and when he chickens out during the glass bridge game and refuses to go forward, threatening the lives of all players, Mi-nyeo volunteers to go forward, only to throw him through the glass bridge along with herself to their deaths in revenge for him betraying her and breaking her heart. His character has similarities to Player 230, Thanos.

Heo Sung-tae, who normally plays villainous characters, gained 900,000 followers on Instagram after playing Jang Deok-su on Squid Game.

==== Han Mi-nyeo ====
Han Mi-nyeo, also known as Player 212, is portrayed by Kim Joo-ryoung.

A loud, eccentric, and manipulative woman, Mi-nyeo is implied to be a con artist, though her reason for entering the games remains unknown. She claims to have had a newborn child who had neither been named or registered, but this claim is dubious. Mi-nyeo quickly adapts to the games' dynamics, initially playing selfishly like Jang Deok-su, and allies with those who offer her protection or benefits. After helping Deok-su in cheating during the ppopgi game, the two become sexually involved and Mi-nyeo joins his team. However, he expels her in favor of physically stronger male players for the tug of war game, prompting her to vow revenge and join Gi-hun's team. Mi-nyeo does not participate in the marbles game, as she lacks a partner, but is spared from elimination. When Deok-su hesitates during the glass bridge game, Mi-nyeo volunteers to go forward, only to drag Deok-su and herself to their deaths, allowing the finalists to advance and fulfilling her revenge.

Mi-nyeo became one of the most polarizing characters in the first season, although her ending received praise from viewers. Kim Joo-ryoung, who had previously worked with director Hwang Dong-hyuk on the film Silenced, was personally approached for the role by Hwang, and remarked that working on Squid Game "felt like [she] was dreaming".

==== Park Jung-bae ====
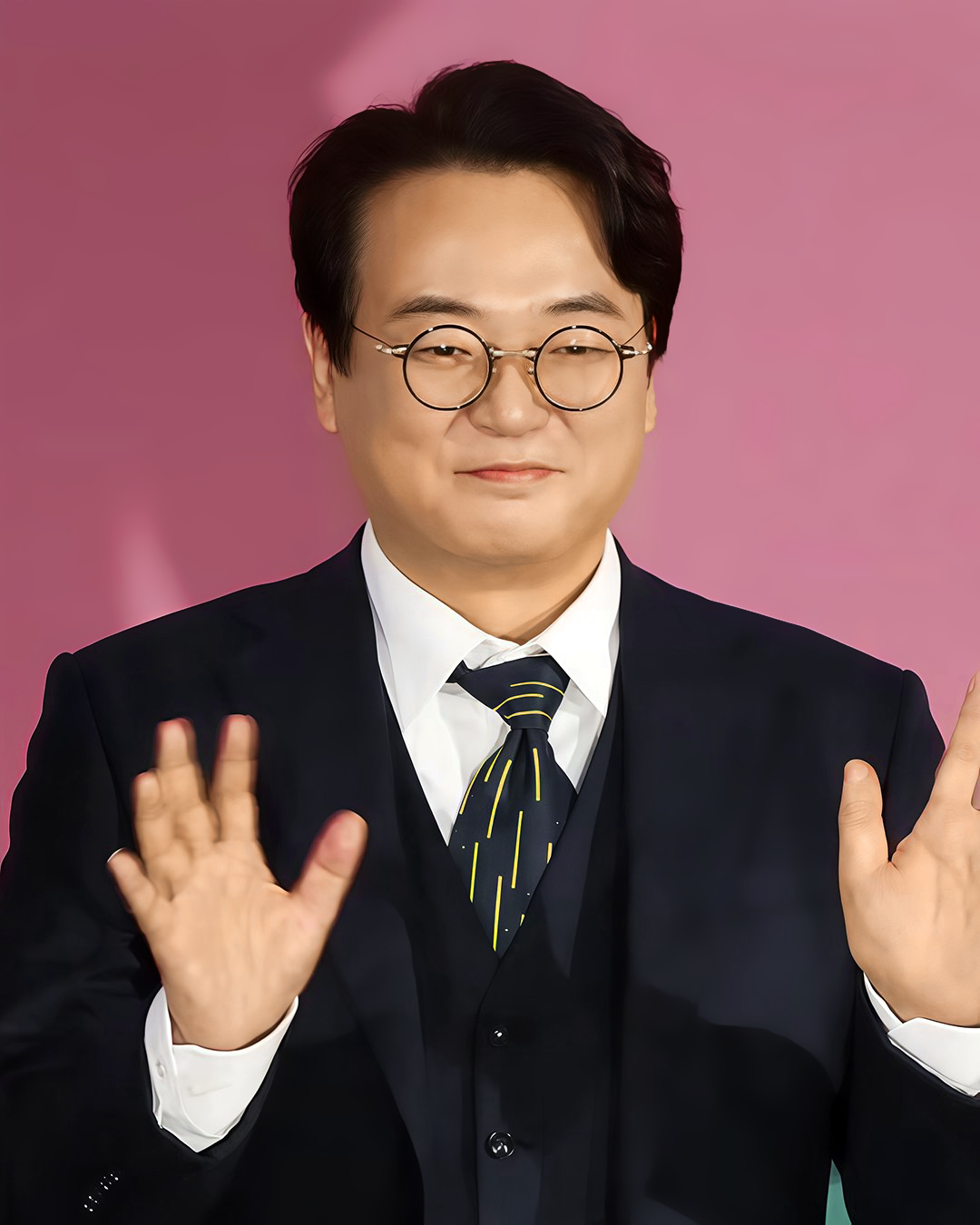
Lee Seo-hwan portrayed Park Jung-bae

Park Jung-bae, also known as Player 390 in the second season, is portrayed by Lee Seo-hwan.

In the opening episode of the first season, Jung-bae is introduced as a good friend of Gi-hun with whom he gambles on horse racing together. In the second episode, he is unable to offer Gi-hun a loan or a job at the bar he runs, when his friend temporarily returns from the Squid Game, which forces Gi-hun back into the games.

In season two, Jung-bae reunites with Gi-Hun, whom he has not seen since the events of the first season, as a Squid Game participant after a divorce from his wife. He catches up with Gi-Hun as they are heading up for Red Light, Green Light, and initially does not take his warnings about the deadly nature of the games seriously. Afterward, he votes for the unsuccessful "leave" side and joins Gi-Hun's team for the following games. A former Marine, he bonds with Kang Dae-ho, another former Marine who shows him great respect. A fight breaks out by Thanos and Nam-gyu against Lee Myung-gi, Jung-bae and Dae-ho showed sympathy to the Myung-gi and compliments In-ho. Dae-ho is recruited to Gi-Hun's team for the second game along with Jun-hee. Jung-bae completes the Biseokchigi minigame in the second game perfectly using his previous baseball experience. After the game, Jung-bae compliments Dae-ho on his Gonggi skills which prompts the latter to compliment the former due to his Biseokchigi, further solidifying the friendship between the two Marines.

Jung-bae votes to stay for the third game and is embarrassed, but has his apology accepted by the rest of the team. Jung-bae stands up against Thanos, who tried to kill Myung-gi again, forcing Thanos to leave the scene and asks Myung-gi to join Gi-hun for protection against Thanos. That night, he bonds with Gi-hun over their participation in the Dragon Motor strike. In the final round of the Mingle game, he is saved by In-ho, who kills another participant to bring the number of occupants in their room to the required two. He is disquieted by this, but his attempts to tell Gi-hun and Dae-ho after switching his vote to "leave" in the third vote are interrupted by the final two votes cast.

Jung-bae participates in Gi-hun's scheme to overwhelm the guards and try to storm the control room with the stolen weapons. He and Gi-hun reach the stairs below the control room to capture the Masked Officer before they are overwhelmed by guards. Due to Gi-hun and Jung-bae running out of ammo, the betrayal of In-ho who shoots two flanking players in the back, the death of the players holding the staircase, and Dae-ho's failure to get the ammo out of fear. Gi-hun and Jung-bae opt to surrender. Jung-bae is then executed by the In-ho, now dressed in his Front Man suit, in front of Gi-Hun as an example of what happens to those who attempt heroics. He is then scanned for his elimination whilst Gi-hun is restrained and In-ho and the Masked Officer concludes the rebellion. His body is later hung for display alongside other killed players prior to the Hide and Seek game to make an example out of them for attempting to take down the games. Dae-ho is seen looking at Jung-bae's corpse in distress while Gi-hun stares at him.

==== The Guards ====
The Guards are a group of individuals in dark pink jumpsuits and black full-face masks equipped with electronic voice modulators. They work under the Front Man and the Masked Officer. They have a hierarchy system, indicated by the symbols on their masks; circles are workers who perform everyday tasks and dispose of bodies, triangles are soldiers in charge of eliminating players, and squares are supervisors who oversee the workers and soldiers. Any guard whose identity is revealed faces immediate execution.

=== Introduced in Season 2 ===
==== Park Yong-sik ====
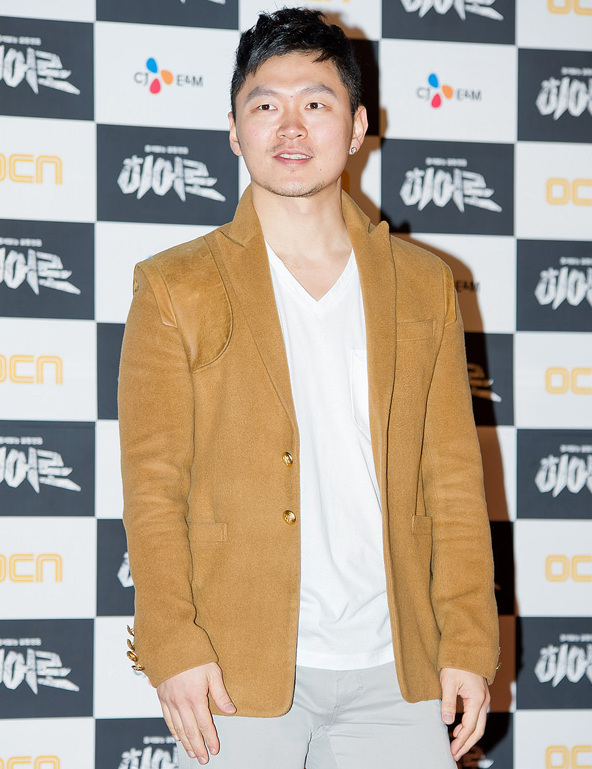
Yang Dong-geun portrayed Park Yong-sik

Park Yong-sik, also known as Player 007, is portrayed by Yang Dong-geun.

A former gambler and the son of Geum-ja. Despite his mother's warnings, he votes to continue the games in order to earn more and pay off more of his debts, but has a change of heart after almost losing her in the "mingle" game. In the hide and seek game, he switches places with his mother to become a seeker but is unable to kill any of the hiders. Unwilling to kill his mother, he instead targets Jun-hee and her newborn baby out of desperation, but is stopped by his mother, who stabs him in the back. He accepts his death and is executed by the guards. Geum-ja reveals that his trusting nature and blaming himself for everything led to him being financially exploited by others before entering the games, and that her snapping at him had led to him attempting suicide prior to the games.

==== Jang Geum-ja ====
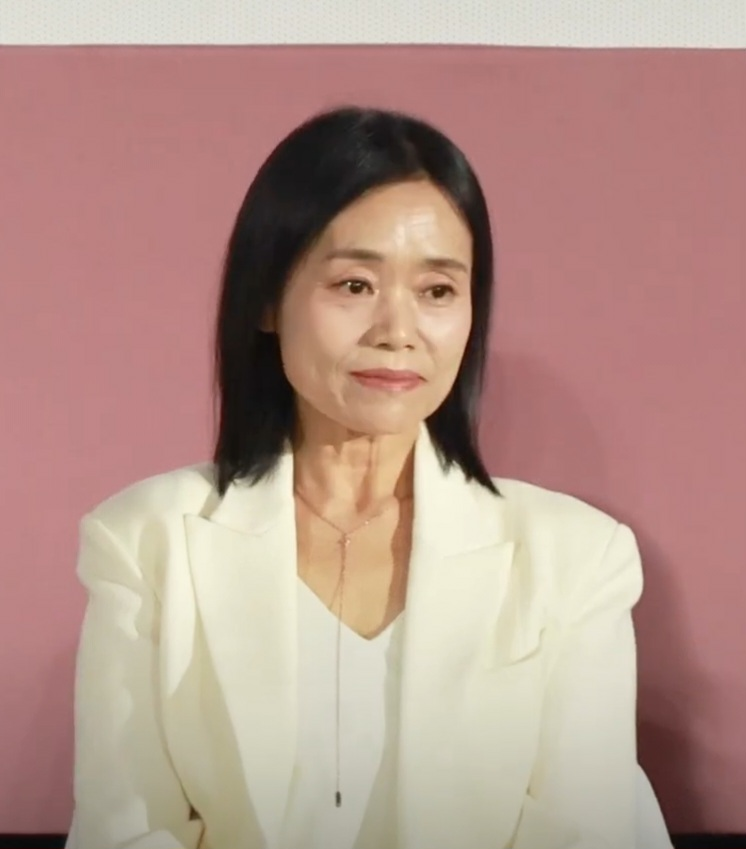
Kang Ae-shim portrayed Jang Geum-ja

Jang Geum-ja, also known as Player 149, is portrayed by Kang Ae-shim.

Yong-sik's elderly mother who enters the game to pay off her son's debts, unaware that her own son also participates in the game. Having raised Yong-sik as a single mother after separating from her abusive husband, she is a survivor of the Korean War and despite her crass dialog, is deeply caring, even welcoming the ostracized Cho Hyun-ju into her group, which later merges with Seong Gi-hun's team due to their shared intention to end the game early and save as many people as possible. In the hide and seek game, Geum-ja reluctantly switches places with Yong-sik and offers to let her son kill her, but when he targets Jun-hee instead, she stops him by stabbing him in the back, after which he gives up and allows himself to be killed by the guards. Devastated and guilt-ridden by her son's death, Geum-ja gives Gi-hun a final charge to take care of Jun-hee and her baby before hanging herself, having nothing left to live for.

==== Kim Jun-hee ====
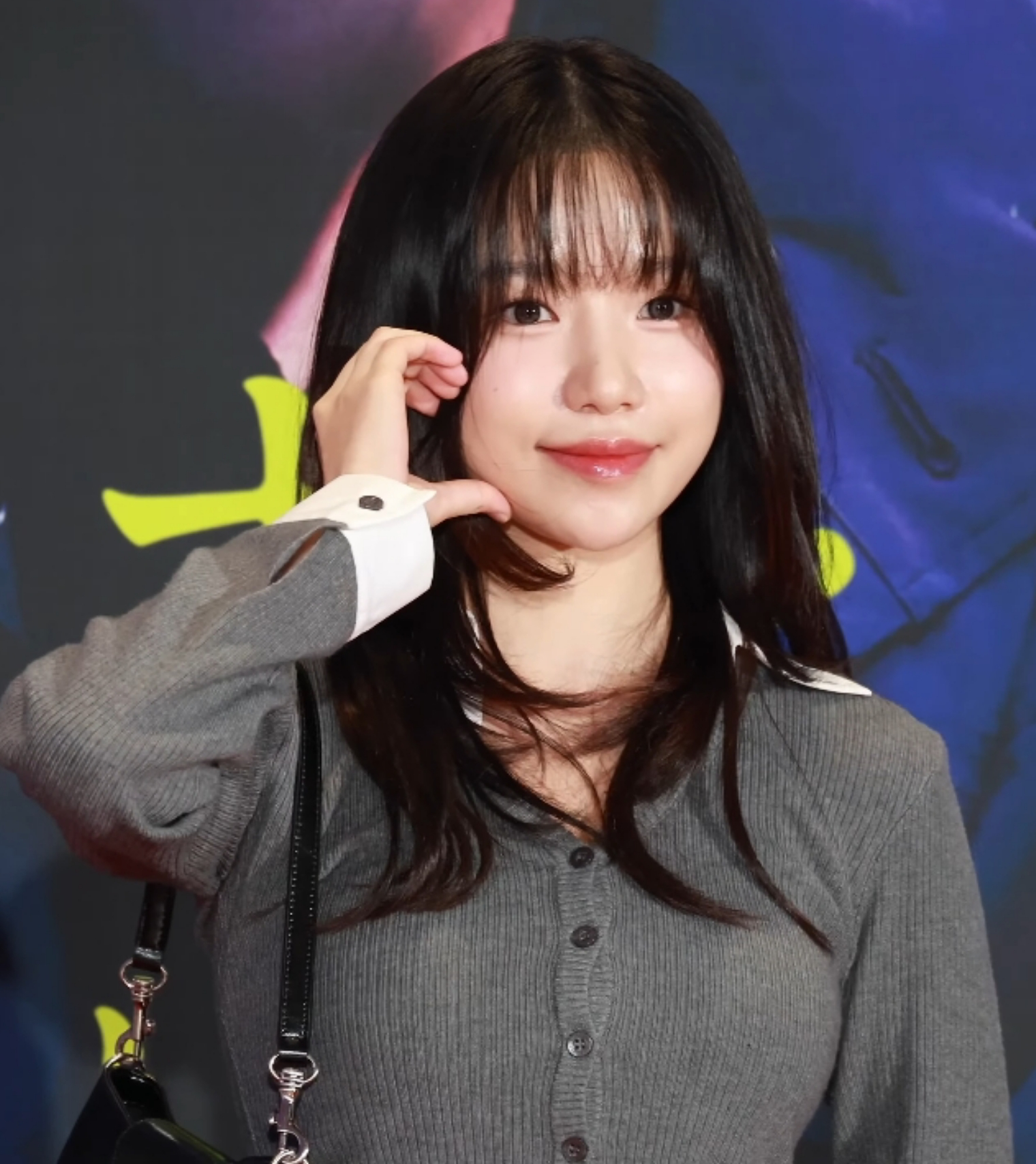
Jo Yuri portrayed Kim Jun-hee

Kim Jun-hee, also known as Player 222, is portrayed by Jo Yuri.

Myung-gi's pregnant ex-girlfriend who lost her money buying Myung-gi's crypto and is looking for a way to make a living for her child. Jun-hee is vengeful of Myung-gi at first for his apparent scam and for deserting her when she became pregnant, but after he saves her life in several instances and stands up for her, begins to forgive him despite keeping her guard up. She then finds Myung-gi in the games and scolds him about the bad investment advice. She later convinces Myung-gi not to go along with Gi-hun's armed rebellion after the Bathroom Fight. In addition to Myung-gi, several other players, such as Gi-hun's team, Jang Geum-ja, Kang Dae-ho and her team, and even In-ho, are protective of her due to her pregnancy. Despite her condition, Jun-hee is surprisingly agile and resourceful. She also states she has no family left.

She gives birth to a baby girl with the help from Geum-ja and Hyun-ju during the Hide and Seek game, but also suffers a severe ankle sprain. She witnesses Hyun-ju's death to Myung-gi, breaking her trust to him because of Nam-gyu. After the game, she sees Geum-ja's corpse hanged and is heartbroken. Knowing that she will be unable to complete the Jump Rope game, she deliberately steps off the starting platform and falls to her death after urging Gi-hun to look after her baby. Her death causes Myung-gi and Gi-hun to break down in tears.

==== Lee Myung-gi ====
Lee Myung-gi, also known as Player 333, is portrayed by Yim Si-wan.

Lee Myung-gi
- First appearance: Bread or Lottery
- Last appearance: Humans Are…
- Portrayed by: Im Si-wan

A former YouTuber known as "MG Coin" who lost money as a result of a failed crypto investment he made and recommended to his followers, and is Jun-hee's ex-boyfriend and the father of her child. Several of the other contestants, including Jun-hee, Thanos and Nam-gyu, also lost their life savings as a result of following Myung-gi's ill-fated advice and vow revenge on him, though he reminds them they were responsible for heeding his advice and not selling at the right time. Myung-gi shocked to see Jun-hee in the games, after his fight with Thanos and Nam-gyu. Myung-gi changed his ways through the games by changing his vote to X to terminate the games. Myung-gi joins Park Gyeong-seok in the third game and indirectly with Gi-hun's team. He becomes protective over Jun-hee as the games go on, despite her initial protests, and he kills Thanos in a brawl due to the latter's and Nam-gyu's continued threats against him and Min-su and desire to continue the games at the risk of harming Jun-hee and her baby. Myung-gi attempts to join the rebellion to capture the Masked Officer but Jun-hee tells him not to.

In season 3, Myung-gi becomes more desperate as the game continues, becoming an antagonist as the series progresses. In the Hide and Seek game, he teams up with Nam-gyu, who reconciles with Myung-gi to kill several players past their required number of victims, including killing Hyun-ju who was protecting Jun-hee and his newborn baby. Myung-gi is heartbrokened by this, so he decided to prevent Nam-gyu from finding Jun-hee. After the Hide and Seek game, Jun-hee is enraged at him killing Hyun-ju and refuses to speak to him afterwards. In the next game, Jump Rope, Gi-hun becomes the first person to cross while saving his baby. Myung-gi attempts to cross with an injured Jun-hee, but she refuses to make amends with him and he goes on alone; he is distraught when Jun-hee decides to commit suicide instead. Afterwards, his baby is made into Jun-hee's number, Player 222, in her place, and he defends his baby and Gi-hun from the other players. In the final game, Sky Squid Game, he begins manipulating and killing the players, especially Jeong-dae and Min-su until only he, his baby, and Gi-hun are left. Out of greed, he intends to kill his baby and Gi-hun to retrieve the final prize money, even accusing Gi-hun of having an affair with Jun-hee. Myung-gi and Gi-hun fight, which leads to both tumbling over the edge with Myung-gi barely holding on to his jacket held by Gi-hun. The jacket rips, sending Myung-gi to his death.

==== Kang Dae-ho ====
Kang Dae-ho, also known as Player 388, is portrayed by Kang Ha-neul.

He was the youngest child and only son in his family among four older sisters. In season 2, he claimed to be a former Marine. During the second game, Dae-ho plays the gonggi, which initially was questioned by Jung-bae who asks "You? A former Marine?" but after Dae-ho explains to Jung-bae and Jun-hee he used to play it with his sisters, Jung-bae supports him by saying that there is nothing a Marine cannot do. After the end of the second game, Jung-bae compliments Dae-ho due to how skilled he was back then, and Dae-ho compliments Jung-bae right back due to him also being skilled at biseokchigi. In Mingle, Dae-ho and Jun-hee teams with Hyun-ju's team. As the season unfolds, Dae-ho mentions that his father served in the Vietnam War and made him join the Marines to "man up". He then gets into major conflicts with Player 226, Kim Yeong-sam, leading to both teams arguing. Despite his gung-ho demeanor, Dae-ho suffers an acute stress reaction while supporting Gi-hun's rebellion and freezes up when retrieving ammunition for the rebels, which in part causes it to fail.

In season 3, Yong-sik tells Hyun-ju and Gi-hun that it was Dae-ho's fault for the failed rebellion. He becomes spooked and hysterical when Gi-hun gives him a death stare throughout the wait for the next game, as Gi-hun marks him as a target. He then blames Gi-hun calling foolish for attempting the rebellion before admitting that he never served in the Marines. After being chased, Dae-ho is strangled to death by Gi-hun following a scuffle, making him the only character to be intentionally killed by Gi-hun.

==== Kang No-eul ====
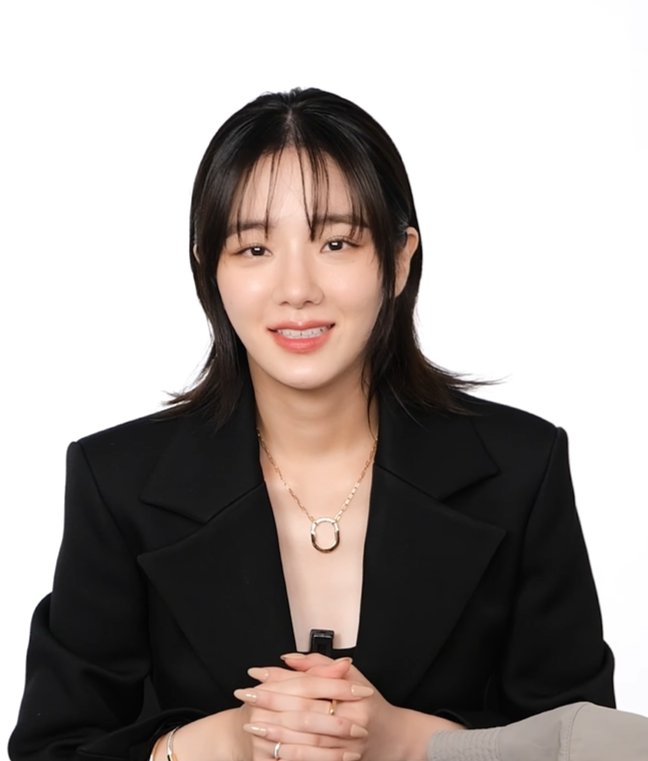
Park Gyu-young portrayed Kang No-eul

Kang No-eul, also known as Guard 011, is portrayed by Park Gyu-young.

A former North Korean soldier who defected after killing her abusive commander, No-eul had been searching for her infant daughter left behind in the North before joining the game as a pink-soldier. Prior to the games, she worked at an amusement park as a masked character, barely making ends meet while living out of her car and struggling with alcoholism. At the park, she worked alongside the struggling artist Park Gyeong-seok, who later joins the game as a contestant. She forms a bond with Park's terminally ill daughter before her hospitalization, and is therefore reluctant to harm Gyeong-seok as a guard. She is seen killing elimiated players in the first game. However, she interferes with the secret organ harvesting operation by double tapping eliminated contestants to end their suffering by killing a player in front of Gi-hun who was intended to be used for organ trafficking, until she is threatened by the operation's participants and their namely, the Masked Officer, who is a fellow North Korean defector, and the Front Man's right hand man. He wears a square mask and dressed in black.

No-eul helps Gyeong-seok escape after he is captured following the rebellion, also using this as an opportunity to take out the organ-harvesting operation's participants. She confronts and kills the Masked Officer and while destroying the Game's records of Gyeong-seok, discovers her own records and reads that since her defection, her husband was executed and her daughter has also died. No-eul considers committing suicide, but after watching Gi-hun's sacrifice to save Jun-hee's baby and hearing his final speech condemning the games, she drops her gun and is moved to tears; remembering her drive to protect Gyeong-seok's daughter and escapes the self-destructing island. After visiting Gyeong-seok and his daughter at the park, she hears that her own daughter is alive and well in China and is last seen boarding a flight to try and reunite with her.

==== Choi Su-bong / Thanos ====
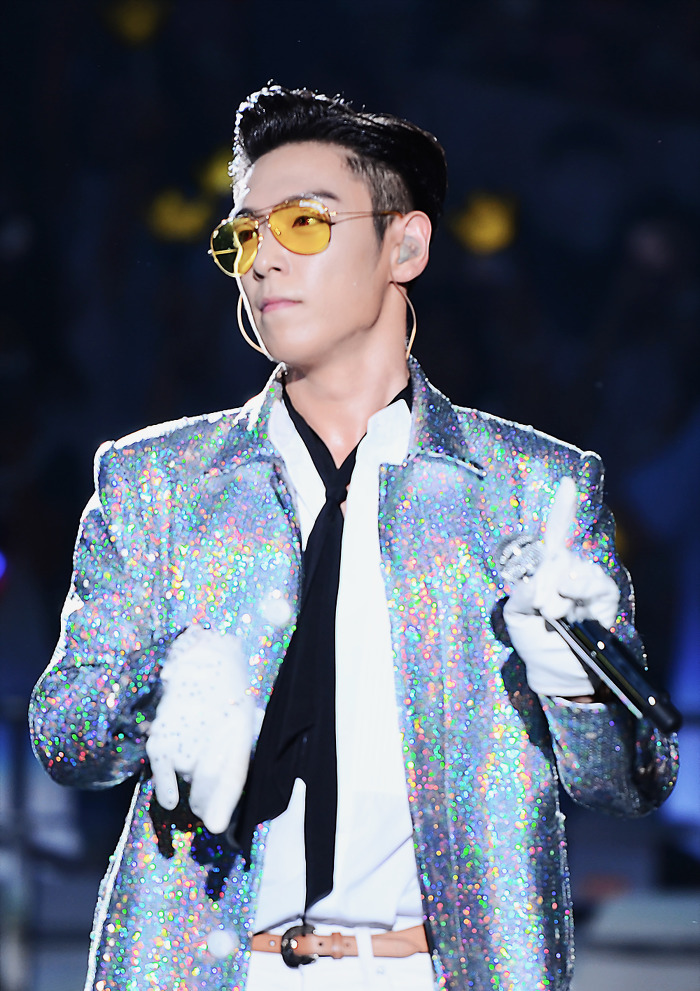
T.O.P portrayed Thanos

Choi Su-bong, also known as Player 230 or by his stage name Thanos, is portrayed by Choi Seung-hyun, better known as the rapper T.O.P. In the series, Thanos is a rapper struggling with a drug problem, and he wears a cross-shaped necklace filled with drugs that he takes to calm his nerves during the games. His stage name is based on the Marvel supervillain Thanos.

As one of Lee Myung-gi's followers who lost their money in a failed cryptocurrency venture, Thanos relentlessly hounds Myung-gi and vows to make him pay. He reveals that he was on the brink of suicide before receiving an invitation card at the bridge where he had planned to jump. Thanos is otherwise portrayed as a carefree and boastful character, unaware of the consequences of his actions, though he becomes embittered toward players who wish to end the games. He befriends Nam-gyu and they both confront Myung-gi before being noticed by a fan named Gyeong-su. The first game, he flirts with Kang Min-a, who later dies, and Thanos takes his drugs and later ruins Gi-hun's strategy. During the first vote, right after Thanos votes to continue the games, Gi-hun interrupts. Later, Thanos walks to Gi-hun and an attempt to give away tips on how to win. This leds to Gi-hun arguing with Thanos. The vote ends with Hwang In-ho, as Player 100, vote to continues the games. He and Nam-gyu fights with Myung-gi but the duo was beaten by Hwang In-ho, the Front Man. The trio teams with Min-su and Se-mi in the next game.

After the second voting, he taunts Myung-gi about the current share with the prize money but Myung-gi responds by Thanos's decisions and his defeat in a rap tournament. This leds to Thanos attempting to choke Myung-gi, but Jung-bae stands up against Thanos, who then sees In-ho, forcing him to leave the scene.

After the third voting session and Gyeong-su's death, Thanos bullies Min-su and later Myung-gi and threatens to kill him and woo his girlfriend, Kim Jun-hee, if he continues to vote for ending the games; this leads to a fistfight between the two men, which escalates into a brawl in the men's bathroom, resulting in the deaths of five players. Thanos nearly strangles Myung-gi to death but is ultimately killed by him using a fork saved from the day's meal.

In Season 3, he was being hallucinated by Min-su, scolding him about the drugs before being switched to Nam-gyu back and forth. Min-su then kicks Thanos and Nam-gyu in anger and the hallucination stops when Lee Myung-gi witnesses this.

Director Hwang Dong-hyuk praised T.O.P. for his courage in returning to the public spotlight after a nine-year hiatus and for portraying a character facing personal challenges akin to those T.O.P. had encountered in his own life, stating, "Despite the long hiatus, I have to say, as a director, he performed very impressively and I'm very satisfied with what he did with the character.". The character is contrasted to Jang Deok-su

==== Nam-gyu ====
Nam-gyu
- Portrayed by: Ron Jae-won
- Voiced by: Roh Jae-won

Nam-gyu, also known as Nam-su by Thanos or Player 124, is portrayed by Roh Jae-won. Nam-gyu is among those who lost millions while following Lee Myung-gi's advice. He is Thanos' right-hand man, and does not get along with Se-mi and Min-su, though Thanos sticks up more for the latter. Like Thanos, he has given hatred towards Myung-gi and Se-mi and also desires killing in order to survive the games. Nam-gyu also partakes in the drugs Thanos uses and becomes hostile to those willing to end the games early, such as Myung-gi, Se-mi, and Min-su. He and Thanos confronts Min-su and a fight brokes out with Lee Myung-gi after they mock him, Min-su and Kim Jun-hee. After Thanos is killed by Myung-gi during a brawl, Nam-gyu retrieves Thanos's drugs and kills several X-team members, including Se-mi, in revenge.

In season 3 during the fourth game, he is chosen as a seeker, given a knife and points it at Myung-gi and Cho Hyun-ju. He teams with Myung-gi, who switched to a seeker by Jun-hee, to kill the players as the hiders. In the game, he then gets denied and threatened by Myung-gi after requesting him to find Jun-hee. Nam-gyu then provokes Min-su about Se-mi and uses Thanos's words to bully him. After Hyun-ju is killed, Nam-gyu gets high due to the drug consumption whilst Myung-gi prevents him from killing Jun-hee. He is seen as a figure when Min-su was hallucinating him. After he loses Thanos's drugs, he votes to discontinue the game to no avail. During the fifth game, Nam-gyu, going through drug withdrawal, discovers that Min-su has the cross necklace containing the drugs. Min-su, fed up with Nam-gyu's bullying, throws the cross onto the bridge. Nam-gyu becomes the first player to venture onto the bridge in hopes of retrieving the cross, only to find out that there are no more drugs inside, causing a despondent Nam-gyu to be knocked off the bridge and fall to his death.

==== Park Min-su ====
Park Min-su, also known as Player 125, is portrayed by Lee David.

A shy, brash, and timid young man, Min-su is initially allied with Se-mi. The two later join forces with Thanos and his crew, despite the latter's disdain for them, believing she can manipulate them. Se-mi initially trusts Min-su, thinking he will be loyal to her due to his meek nature, but he is easily influenced by Thanos and Nam-gyu. In Mingle, he tries to save Gyeong-su before being pulled to safety by Semi. He then ultimately betrays Se-mi during the Mingle game because he lacks the courage to stand up for her because of Thanos. He is then left alone in the final round but manages to survive with another player. Under pressure and had enough of being bullied by Thanos to continue the games after "Mingle," Min-su eventually decides to stand up for his own principles and votes to end the games, opposing Thanos. Thanos and Nam-gyu keep pressuring him, leading to Lee Myung-gi protecting him whilst arising a brawl that results in Thanos's death after they bring Jun-hee as the subject. During the O-team's revenge riot, Min-su attempts to protect Se-mi from Nam-gyu by dropping a glass bottle on him but fails, leading to Se-mi's death. Following her murder by Nam-gyu, Min-su hides in fear and is later overwhelmed by guilt for not having the courage to protect her.

In season 3, during the fourth game, he discovers Thanos's drug necklace that Nam-gyu dropped and begins using it. Under the influence of the drugs, he kills Seon-nyeo when he hallucinates seeing her as Nam-gyu taunting him. When a distressed Nam-gyu votes ‘X,’ Min-su, fed up with his bullying, votes to continue the game as an act of revenge for killing Se-mi. People also remember when Nam-gyu said "You can do it my bro Min-su" imitating Thanos 230 before the 4th game. During the fifth game, he tempts Nam-gyu by throwing the cross necklace, supposedly containing the last of the drugs, onto the bridge. Nam-gyu discovers the necklace is empty and is subsequently pushed off the bridge by the rope, while Min-su barely makes it across. As the drugs run out, Min-su gets drunk and goes through withdraws during the feast and votes to terminate the games with Gi-hun before the final game and is shunned by the other players for his intoxicated and mentally deteriorating state, in which he hallucinates seeing Thanos and Nam-gyu. He is voted out during the first round, triggering a mental breakdown as he fights back against Im Jeong-dae and other finalists. As Myung-gi carefully pushes him off the tower to his death, Min-su envisions Se-mi offering her hand, welcoming him to the afterlife.

==== Im Jeong-dae ====
Im Jeong-dae, also known as Player 100, is portrayed by Song Young-chang.

Jeong-dae is a brash, greedy middle-aged man who is revealed to owe 10 billion won in debt, nearly a quarter of the promised prize money. Throughout the games, he befriends Kim Yeong-sam. In the first vote, Jeong-dae falsely accuses Gi-hun for false information about his experience of the games and Thanos takes it as an advantage to ask for tips. Jeong-dae and Yeong-sam agrees with Thanos and the trio continues to mock Gi-hun. Initially approaching Gi-hun for advice, he and Kim Yeong-sam turns against him when the second game is revealed not to be Dalgona, as Gi-hun recalls. Jeong-dae bullies and intimidates other players, especially the X-team members, and sees little value in their lives, focusing primarily on winning as much money as possible and taking advantage of others. Despite this, his charisma allows him to convince many players to continue competing and join his side, making him one of the loudest voices on the O-team and enabling them to win each voting round by a landslide. Jeong-dae reaches the final game and unsuccessfully negotiates with the remaining finalists to eliminate Jun-hee's baby and Gi-hun. Jeong-dae is seen as a coward when he is a hider and on the run from seekers and Nam-gyu and also frightened as time was running out when trying to eliminate Min-su. He then appears to switch strategies, offering Gi-hun and Myung-gi the chance to sacrifice Player 039 (nicknamed “lunchbox”) and split the prize money. However, he is killed by the unconvinced Lee Myung-gi, who pushes him off the tower in cold blood.

==== Seon-nyeo ====
Seon-nyeo, also known as Player 044, is portrayed by Chae Kook-hee.

An unpleasant, loudmouthed, self-proclaimed shaman, she often talks about people's destined deaths. She is the archenemy of Cho Hyun-ju. In the second game, she teams up with Hyun-Ju, Yong-sik, Geum-ja, and Young-mi, nearly costing them their lives by fumbling with the flying top, until Hyun-Ju forces her to focus. In the second round of the Mingle game, her former teammates abandon her as the odd one out, leading her to develop a grudge and a desire to see them fail in the games. Seon-nyeo later gains several followers after others heed her advice, but her abilities as a medium come into question during the hide-and-seek game, in which she causes the deaths of most of them. When she finds the exit and leads Jeong-dae to it, he locks her out, after which she is killed by a hallucinating Min-su.

==== Choi Woo-seok ====
Choi Woo-seok, portrayed by Jeon Seok-ho, is a member of Mr. Kim's loan shark group. He is close with his boss who officiated his wedding and is partnered with him in the search for the Recruiter in the season two opener. After trailing the Recruiter, he is captured alongside Mr. Kim and forced to play a game combining rock paper scissors and Russian roulette. After surviving the first few rounds and then falling into a pattern of picking the same hand, Woo-seok throws two rocks, which prompts Mr. Kim to sacrifice himself to save Woo-seok. Woo-seok is later freed from the Recruiter by Gi-hun and eagerly joins him in vendetta against the game organizers to get revenge for Mr. Kim. He joins Jun-ho, Captain Park, and the mercenaries in their naval trips to try and find the island. In the final episode of season two, he stumbles upon Park after he has killed their drone operator, but falls for the excuse that the noises he heard were falling boxes.

In season 3, Choi finally catches on in noticing Park's suspicious behavior, returning ashore to investigate while keeping Jun-ho in the loop. He finds evidence of Park working with the game runners, namely a photograph depicting him with the Recruiter, in addition to large amounts stowed away cash and a Pink Guard uniform. However, he is arrested for breaking into Park's residence and killing the latter's dog while doing so and for his past activity as a loan shark, but not before calling Jun-ho to warn him. Choi is later set free following the end of the games.

==== Park Gyeong-seok ====
Park Gyeong-seok, also known as Player 246, is portrayed by Lee Jin-wook.

A financially-strapped artist who had a daughter hospitalized for leukemia and required a bone marrow transplant. He is a former co-worker of Kang No-eul at an amusement park prior to the two joining the games. Gyeong-seok is noticed by No-eul in the first game which prompts her to protect him. He teams with Lee Myung-gi during the third game and later joins Hyun-ju's team, replacing Seon-nyeo, after he saves Kim Young-mi and Hyun-ju in the third game. As a pink guard, No-eul is reluctant to kill Gyeong-seok due to knowing about his daughter's sickness. Gyeong-seok later joins Gi-hun's rebellion against the pink guards, but the rebellion fails and he is seemingly among those executed after surrendering. However, thanks to Kang No-eul, he survives the games following his elimination and reunites with his daughter. He didn't get any money from the games, but managed to get enough money with the help of his co-workers at the amusement park as his daughter still recovered from her fatal illness. He along with Jun-hee's baby and In-ho survives the games.

==== Cho Hyun-ju ====
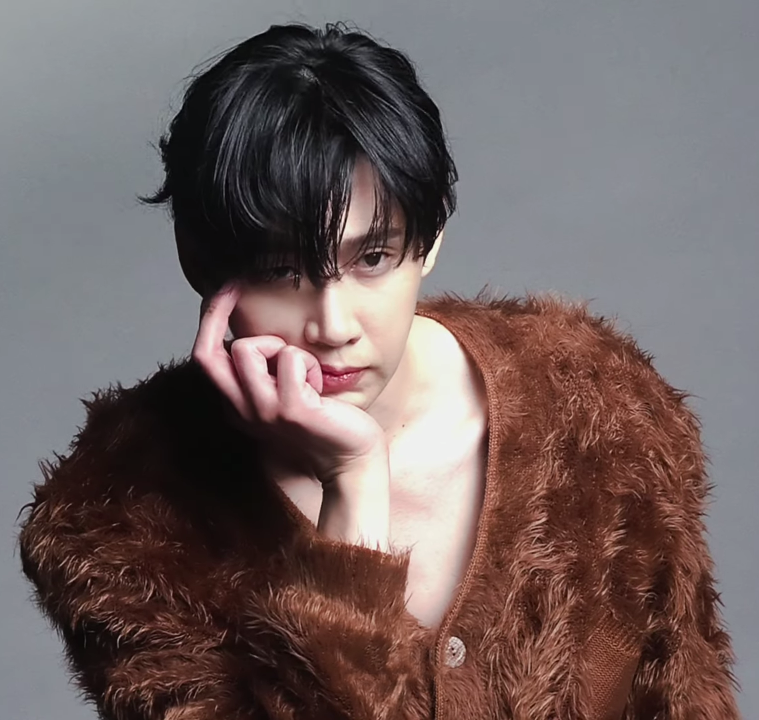
Park Sung-hoon portrayed Cho-Hyun-ju

Cho Hyun-ju, also known as Player 120, is portrayed by Park Sung-hoon. A former special forces sergeant and transgender woman, Hyun-ju enters the games to fund her gender-affirming surgery. After coming out, she lost her job, friends, and faced alienation from her parents. She is also initially ostracized by most of the players but later gains their respect as the games progress, forming alliances mainly with Kim Young-mi, Park Yong-sik, and Yong-sik's mother Jang Geum-ja and briefly with Seon-nyeo, who is a shaman and later betrays them. After Young-mi's death, she is taunted and in distraught by Seon-nyeo. Hyun-ju fights back at Seon-nyeo but later calms and sits with the other players, witnessing Kang Dae-ho and Kim Yeong-sam's argument. Hyun-ju's intensive military background plays a crucial role in Gi-hun's rebellion, as she trains the fighters to use submachine guns stolen from the pink guards. She evades the pink guards' reinforcements by retreating to find the panicked Kang Dae-ho, becoming one of only three rebels to survive the failed riot alongside Dae-ho and the captured Gi-hun.

The following of the failure of the riot, she asks Gi-hun on whereabouts of Jung-bae. She then witnesses Gi-hun in distraught of begging for suicide. In the game, she becomes a hider and is later held at a knifepoint by Nam-gyu. She teams with Jun-hee and Geum-ja throughout the games. She kills Kim Yeong-sam and another player before being stabbed to death unknowingly by Myung-gi.

Prior to the season's release, the casting of Park Sung-hoon as the transgender ex-soldier Hyun-ju sparked controversy. Critics contended that the role should have been portrayed by a transgender actress to authentically represent the experience, with many expressing dissatisfaction over the casting of a cisgender actor, particularly a cisgender man, instead of a cisgender woman. In response, some pointed out that South Korea's conservative stance on LGBT rights made it difficult to find a transgender actress willing to take on such a high-profile role. Others emphasized that the inclusion of a transgender character in a South Korean series represented a significant step toward greater representation. On December 18, 2024, during a press day for Squid Game 2, director and creator Hwang Dong-hyuk addressed his intent to include a transgender character in the series:

"The people who come to join the games in Squid Game are usually marginalized or neglected from society, and not just financially speaking, but people who would belong to marginalized groups. In season one, the representative character for that was Ali, who was a foreigner working in Korea, which is one of the most representative minority groups in Korea. Currently today, unfortunately, in the Korean society the gender minority is a group that is not as accepted widely within society. I wanted to create a character that would represent that. Acceptance of trans people has gotten better recently, but it's still not where it needs to be. In Korea, when you are a gender minority, it is not as widely accepted yet, unfortunately, and you are still seen to be very much out of the norm. And so by creating a character like Hyun-ju, through her choices, her actions, and the way she carries herself in the game, I hope that that could raise awareness of these issues that we face today."

Park Sung-hoon's portrayal of Hyun-ju won significant praise from critics. Many viewers regarded Hyun-ju as one of the most compelling characters of the second season, citing the character's development and backstory, as well as Park's dedication and depth in the role.

==== Masked Officer ====
The Masked Officer, portrayed by Park Hee-soon, was a former North Korean defector and In-ho's right-hand man, who wears a black suit and a square mask. While the Front Man plays the game to elude the players, the Officer supervises the games and the organ trafficking ring. The Officer finds out that No-eul was recruited and had been interfering with the organ trafficking by killing a player that was intended to be spared. He reminds her that they had met seven years ago when the Officer hands No-eul a card. The Officer warns her about interfering with the operation, and she might get executed by In-ho. Then Gi-hun initiated a revolt which the Officer responds by sending the guards to execute the team. The revolt resulted in the players' defeat, and the Officer arrives to confront Gi-hun and Jung-bae, with In-ho executing Jung-bae before leaving.

The Officer then notices that the organ trafficking team is dead and No-eul is responsible. He then shifts his target from Gi-hun to Gyeong-seok. He sends a group of men to track down No-eul and Gyeong-seok by boat. However, he was captured by No-eul and was forced to erase the data containing Gyeong-seok's info. They both get into a fight and the Officer is killed.

=== Introduced in Season 3 ===
==== Kim Jun-hee's baby ====
During the closing minutes of the Hide and Seek game in Season 3, Kim Jun-hee gives birth to a baby girl. Gi-hun carries the baby to safety in the Jump Rope game, and Jun-hee urges him to look after her before falling to her own death. The VIP's transfer Jun-hee's player number (222) to the baby and make her a participant in the final event, Sky Squid Game. Myung-gi intends to win by throwing the baby off the final platform, but he falls instead and Gi-hun then sacrifices his own life, leaving the baby as the winner. The Front Man saves her from the island's self-destruct sequence and, six months later, turns both her and the prize money over to Jun-ho's care.

== Supporting characters ==
=== Introduced in Season 1 ===
==== Seong Ga-yeong ====
Seong Ga-yeong, later adopting the American name Jenny, is portrayed by Jo Ah-in. The only daughter of Seong Gi-hun and his ex-wife, Ga-yeong loves her father despite annoyance over his troubles and gambling habits and her mother's repeated bad-mouthing of her father. She is eventually taken by her mother to live in Los Angeles with her new stepfather and stepbrother, prompting Gi-hun to participate in the Squid Game to earn a better living and regain custody rights to her. Gi-hun calls her as he prepares to visit her in America following his victory in the Games, but he reneges as he becomes determined to end the Games once and for all.

Prior to re-entering the Games in season 2, Gi-hun calls Ga-yeong again but is unable to speak before she hangs up. Following Gi-hun's death at the end of season 3, Hwang In-ho visits Ga-yeong in Los Angeles, introducing himself as an acquaintance of her father. Ga-yeong, still angry at her father's apparent desertion, tries to turn In-ho away until he informs her of Gi-hun's passing. In-ho leaves her with a package containing her father's bloodied tracksuit and a debit card with access to his remaining winnings.

==== The Recruiter ====
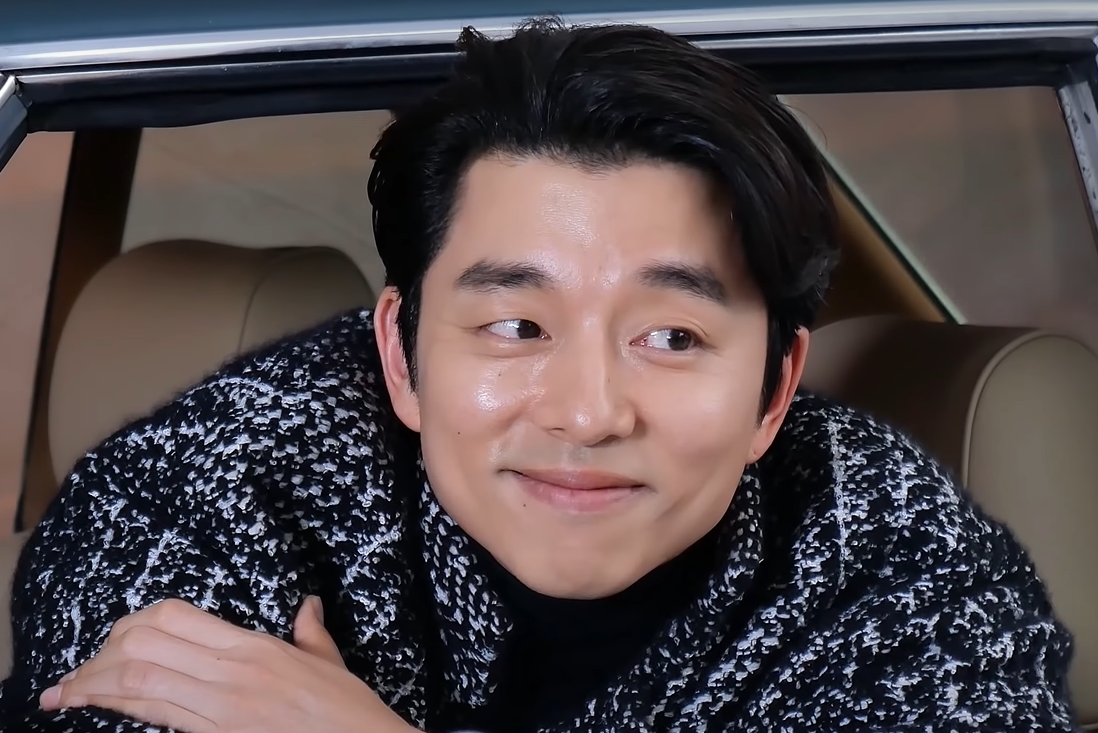
Gong Yoo portrayed The Recruiter

The Recruiter, also known as the Salesman, is portrayed by Gong Yoo. His appearances in the first and second seasons, though brief, received positive reviews from fans on social media.

The unnamed Recruiter, dressed invariably in a suit and carrying a briefcase filled with cash and a pair of ddakji tiles, is responsible for luring players into the games. He seeks out vulnerable individuals and invites them to play ddakji, with ₩100,000 at stake per round. Losing players may either pay the money if they have it, or allow the Recruiter to slap them in the face if they do not. Upon winning, players receive the cash as well as an invitation card with a phone number. Those interested in higher-stakes games can call the number and provide their name and birthdate to confirm their entry and pickup.

In Season 2, Gi-hun hires his former loan shark, Kim, and his lackeys to locate both the Recruiter and the games' Front Man. After two years of fruitless searching, Kim and his associate Choi Woo-seok find and attempt to apprehend the Recruiter, but he overpowers and abducts the pair. He forces them to play a deadly combination of rock paper scissors and Russian roulette, resulting in Kim's death. Gi-hun confronts the Recruiter at the former's base, leading to a tense round of Russian roulette between them. During the round, the Recruiter reveals that he served in the games as first a worker and later a soldier, executing his own father at one point, and derides Gi-hun and all players as "trash". Gi-hun counters by calling the Recruiter a mere pawn of the game's organizers. Stung by this remark, the Recruiter pulls the trigger on the sixth and final turn, taking his own life. Afterward, Gi-hun finds an invitation card in the Recruiter's pocket and uses it to make contact with the Front Man.

==== Kim Jeong-rae ====
Kim Jeong-rae, also known as simply Mr. Kim and initially credited as "Loan Shark Leader", is portrayed by Kim Pub-lae.

In season 1, Mr. Kim is Seong Gi-hun's loan shark, and he threatens to sell the latter's organs should he continue to not pay off his massive debts. After Gi-hun is able to pay them off prior to the events of season 2, Kim believes Gi-hun's story about the Squid Game, having lost track of many others indebted to him, and eagerly joins Gi-hun's efforts to hunt down the games' organizers due to being short on money himself. Kim and his associate Choi Woo-seok are overpowered and abducted by the Recruiter after attempting to capture him, and when forced to play a deadly combination of rock paper scissors and Russian roulette, Kim throws the game to spare Woo-seok, whose wedding he officiated and considered a close friend, and is killed by the Recruiter.

==== Ji-yeong ====
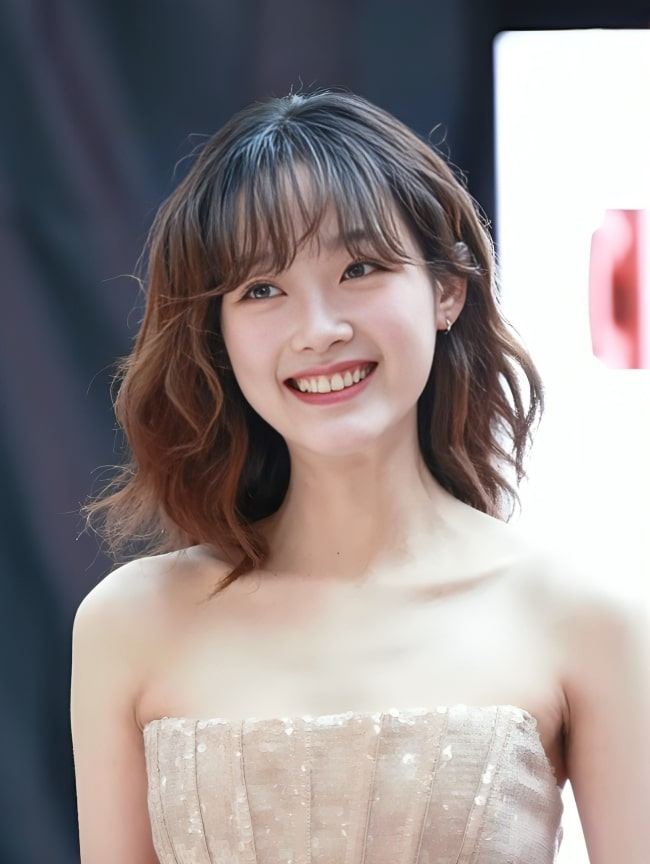
Lee Yoo-mi portrayed Ji-yeong

Ji-yeong, also known as Player 240, is portrayed by Lee Yoo-mi. Prior to her joining the games, Ji-yeong was an ex-convict who was recently released from jail for the murder of her abusive father, who was an alcoholic pastor and the killer of her mother.

During the game, Ji-yeong forms an alliance with Kang Sae-byeok. In the Marbles game, after a conversation about their pasts, Ji-yeong decides to sacrifice herself so Sae-byeok can advance further in the game, believing she has more of a reason to win than her.

==== Byeong-gi ====
Byeong-gi, also known as Player 111 or "The Doctor", is portrayed by Yoo Sung-joo. He is a disgraced doctor who conspires with some of the guards to harvest the organs of deceased or nearly dead players in exchange for extra food and leaked information on the upcoming games. He also joins Jang Deok-su's gang and provides them the information. When the guards fail to get him information, Byeong-gi goes on a rampage and kills a guard in an attempt to escape. As a result, he is killed alongside the guards he worked with by Hwang In-ho, the Front Man, and their bodies are hung for display prior to the Marbles game to make an example out of them for cheating. In season two, the staff comment on how they hired doctors specifically for the organ procurement instead of relying on one of the participants.

=== Introduced in Season 2 ===
==== Se-mi ====
Se-mi, also known as Player 380, is portrayed by Won Ji-an.

A tomboyish young woman, she allies herself with Min-su, trusting him due to his meek nature, and Thanos and his crew, believing she can manipulate them. However, all of her allies, even Min-su, end up deserting her at some point, and she is killed by Nam-gyu, Thanos' right hand man, during the O-team's riot to kill as many X-team members as possible. She later appears to Min-su as he hallucinates while taking Thanos' drugs, as Min-su is guilt-ridden for failing to protect her and letting her die.

==== Gyeong-su ====
Gyeong-su, also known as Player 256, is portrayed by Kang Sung-wook.

Gyeong-su is a massive fan of Thanos and joins his crew during the six-legged pentathlon. Like the rest of Thanos' team, he votes "O" to continue the games. During "Mingle" Thanos, high on ecstasy, kicks Gyeong-su out of the team due to the rooms requiring 4 players. This results in Gyeong-su's death, which Thanos would later react in shock and horror to.

==== Kim Young-mi ====
Kim Young-mi, or Player 095, is portrayed by Kim Si-eun. Timid and reserved, she is the first player to ally with and befriend Cho Hyun-ju, accepting her regardless of her gender identity. Later, they team up with Park Yong-sik and Jang Geum-ja for the six-legged pentathlon, and the four form a bond after the game. During the "Mingle" game, Young-mi becomes separated from the group after colliding with another player and injuring herself. As Myung-gi beats her to the room and shuts the door, Young-mi is unable to reach the group's room in time and is subsequently executed in front of Hyun-ju’s eyes. Young-mi’s elimination causes Hyun-ju's much dismay, as she had tried to save Young-mi but was prevented by Myung-gi to avoid further elimination of the remaining players in the room.

==== Kang Mi-na ====
Kang Mi-na, also known as Player 196, is portrayed by Song Ji-woo. Revealed to be 45 million won in debt, she otherwise has a carefree, vain demeanor. Mi-na catches Thanos' attention prior to the first game and he flirts with her, and the two of them do not take Gi-hun's warnings seriously during "red light, green light". During a red light, Mi-na panics and unfreezes when Thanos tells her there is a bee on her. She is subsequently shot and eliminated, becoming the first player to die in this year's games and causing the other players to realize Gi-hun's warnings were true.

==== Captain Park ====
Captain Park, portrayed by Oh Dal-su, is a fishing boat captain who saved Hwang Jun-ho after he narrowly escaped from the Front Man in season 1. Park spends the year and a half after Jun-ho wakes from his coma helping him find the location of the games, free of cost, by taking him to islands near where Park picked him up. In the first episode of season two, when Jun-ho declares the search hopeless, Park offers to hire him as a squid fisherman. When Jun-ho resumes the search upon teaming up with Gi-hun's mercenaries and the loan shark Choi Woo-seok, Park lets them use his ship. In the season finale, the team's drone pilot discovers him sabotaging the drone, prompting Park, actually working for the Front Man, to stab him and throw him overboard. He is nearly discovered by Woo-seok, but persuades him that the sounds he heard were falling boxes.

In season 3, Choi Woo-Seok becomes suspicious of Park and returns ashore to investigate under the pretense of a family emergency. Park, desperate to keep his cover, attempts to dissuade the crew from searching for the island in its true location, then resorts to killing most of the crew aside from Jun-ho and another sailor when his secret role as a Pink Guard is uncovered by Woo-Seok. Jun-ho evades the attack and shoots Captain Park with a harpoon gun, but when pressed on the island's true location, Park remarks "it's been fun" before succumbing to his wounds, seemingly dying with the secret before Jun-ho rescues Gyeong-seok, also known as Player 246.

==== Park Mal-soon ====
Park Mal-soon, Hwang Jun-ho's mother and Hwang In-ho's stepmother, was portrayed by Lee Joo-sil. Lee died at the age of 80 in February 2025, before the release of the third season.

A caring mother, Mal-soon was concerned for the well-being of both her son and stepson, and felt sad and guilty for not being able to help In-ho to save his pregnant wife, who died of liver failure before she could find a suitable donor.

==== Kang Sae-byeok's mother ====
Kang Sae-byeok's mother, also Kang Cheol's mother, was portrayed by Park Mi-hyun.

According to Season 1, years before Sae-byeok joined the games, her mother was captured during the family's escape from North Korea. This tragedy resulted in the death of her husband, leaving only Sae-byeok and Cheol to survive. While her fate remained unknown throughout Season 1, it was confirmed by a broker hired by Gi-hun in Season 2 that she was still alive in North Korea. She was released from a prison camp in North Hamgyong Province three years after Sae-byeok's death; however, she contracted tuberculosis from an outbreak in the camp and became unfit for travel.

At the end of Season 3, with the broker's assistance, Sae-byeok's mother finally defected to South Korea and reunited with her son, thereby posthumously fulfilling Gi-hun's promise to Sae-byeok.
