= O Yeong-su =

South Korean actor (born 1944)

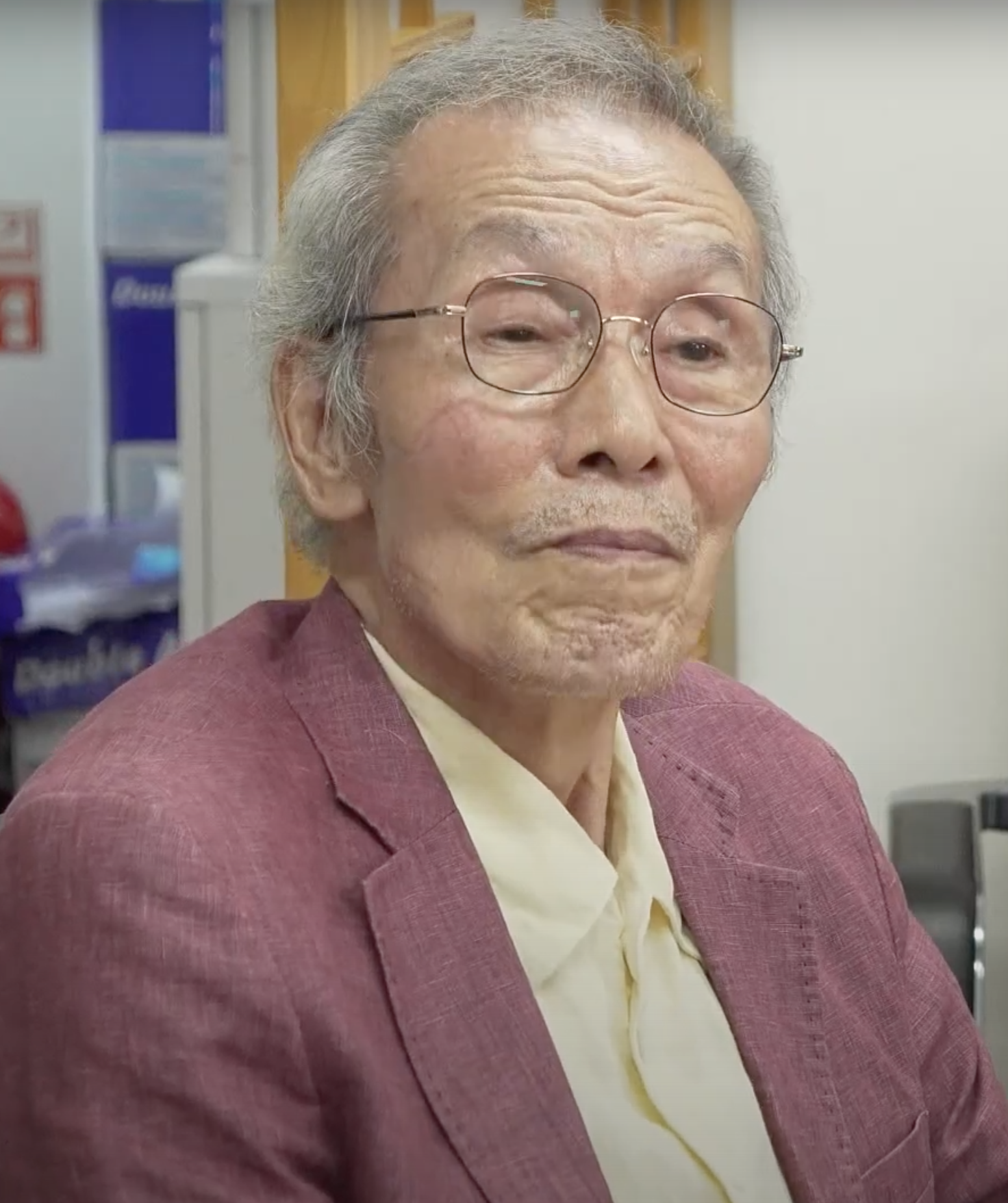
- O in 2022
- Born: O Se-kang; October 19, 1944 (age 82); Kaiho District, Keiki Province, Korea, Empire of Japan
- Occupation: Actor
- Years active: 1963–2022
- Children: 1

Korean name
- Hangul: 오영수
- Hanja: 吳永洙
- RR: O Yeongsu
- MR: O Yŏngsu

O Yeong-su (Korean: 오영수; born O Se-kang, October 19, 1944) is a South Korean actor. He began acting on stage in 1963, from which time he says he has appeared in over 200 plays. He later began acting on screen, often portraying monks due to his experience with Buddhist plays.

In 2021, O portrayed Oh Il-nam in the first season of the Netflix survival drama series Squid Game, which earned him worldwide recognition and won him a Golden Globe Award for Best Supporting Actor in a Series, Miniseries or Television Film, as well as a nomination for the Primetime Emmy Award for Outstanding Supporting Actor in a Drama Series.

== Early life ==
O Yeong-su was born O Se-kang in Kaiho District (then in Japanese-controlled Korea, now Kaepung County in North Korea) on October 19, 1944. His grandfather was a local educator and landlord. After the 38th parallel line was drawn across Korea, he and his family moved to Paju on the South Korean side controlled by the U.S. Army. During the Korean War that soon followed, his father was killed and his brother was kidnapped by North Korean forces.

== Career ==
=== Theatre ===
O began acting in 1963 as part of a theatre crew called "The Square". He was a member of the National Theater Company of Korea from 1987 to 2010, where he worked with actors such as Jang Min-ho, whom he considers his mentor. Throughout his career, he did productions of A Confession for a Black Prostitute (흑인 창녀를 위한 고백, Albert Camus's play adaptation of the novel Requiem for a Nun by William Faulkner), A Streetcar Named Desire, and The Merchant of Venice, among many others. According to O, he had appeared in over 200 productions by 2013.

In his thirties, he played Faust in Goethe's Faust. In retrospect, he said he was probably too young for the role at the time. In his fifties, he played the titular Richard III. He said he was never satisfied with his performance because he felt like he was too old for the role. In his sixties, he expressed an interest to play Willy Loman in Death of a Salesman.

In 2014, O played Prospero in a National Theater of Korea production of William Shakespeare's The Tempest celebrating the 450th anniversary of Shakespeare's birth.

O played a Yeonguijeong in the play Prince Yeonsangun, and appeared in The Problematic Figure in July 2015 and as Vasíly in the play Fathers and Sons, based on the novel of the same name in August 2015.

In 2017, he played the titular King Lear in a production with the Daegu Metropolitan Theater Company. He had previously done a production of King Lear at the Daejeon Museum of Art in 2010. In 2021, it was revealed that he would play the role of Sigmund Freud in the play "Freud's Last Session" by Mark St. Germain which started its first performance in Daehangno on January 7, 2022.

=== Film and television ===
O often portrayed monks on-screen. He credited his experience with Buddhist plays for getting him similar roles on film and television.

In 2021, he played Oh Il-nam in the first season of the Netflix original series Squid Game. The series, which became the most-watched show on Netflix worldwide in its first month of airing, drew newfound attention to O. In January 2022, he won the Golden Globe Award for Best Supporting Actor, Television for his role in the series. He became the first Korean actor to win a Golden Globe.

In November 2021, he narrated an episode of the documentary program Documentary Three Days.

== Personal life ==
O has a daughter who, as he lacked an agent, helped him handle the volume of calls asking him to appear in various roles following Squid Game.

In November 2021, on the first day of that year's Korean Series, O threw the first pitch.

In July 2022, O was appointed Ambassador for Korean Performance Tourism by Park Bo-gyoon, Minister of Culture, Sports and Tourism.

=== Legal issues ===
On November 25, 2022, prosecutors in Suwon announced that O had been indicted on sexual misconduct charges relating to an incident in which he allegedly sexually assaulted a woman in 2017. He was accused of various cases of sexual misconduct in which he had inappropriately hugged, made lewd comments towards, laid in the same bed with, and kissed the alleged victim across multiple incidents. Although he was charged in 2017, he was not indicted until 2022. During his trial in February 2024, the prosecution sought a one-year jail term for O, who denied the charges. A month later, he was initially found guilty and was sentenced to an eight-month suspended prison term, as well as being ordered to attend 40 hours of classes on sexual violence.

Following the initial charges and conviction, O was dropped from a film project and banned from appearing on major Korean broadcasting systems. Following an appeal, O was acquitted in November 2025, with the court citing insufficient evidence and the possibility that the alleged victim's memory of the events might have been distorted over time. O expressed gratitude to the court for its "wise judgment", while the alleged victim criticized the decision. On June 26, 2026, The Supreme Court dismissed the prosecution's appeal and upheld the lower court's ruling that acquitted the 82-year-old of sexual assault charges, according to judicial officials.

== Filmography ==
=== Film ===
Year	Film	Role	Notes	Ref.
1998	The Soul Guardians	Toemarok		
2003	A Little Monk	Temple Master		
2003	Spring, Summer, Fall, Winter... and Spring	Old Monk		

=== Television series ===
Year	Film	Role	Notes	Ref.
1981	1st Republic	Military prosecutor		
1988	The Fairy Of Shampoo	Commercial director		
2009	Queen Seondeok	Monk Wol-Cheon		
2009	The Return of Iljimae	Monk Yeol-gong		
2012	God of War	Monk Su-gi		
2019	Chocolate	Mr. Kim	Cameo (Episode 5)	
2021	Squid Game	Oh Il-nam	Season 1	

=== Television show ===
Year	Title	Role	Notes	Ref.
2021	Documentary 3 Days	Narrator	Documentary	

=== Commercials ===
- "Episode 18, the relationship that grows as we stay" (제18화 머물수록 커지는 인연; 2015) (ad for SK Telecom, with Kim Seol-hyun)
- South Korean government's regulatory innovation policy (넷플릭스 드라마 '오징어 게임'을 통해 '깐부 할아버지'로 널리 알려진 배우 오영수 씨가 정부의 규제혁신 정책광고 모델에 선정됐습니다)

== Theatre ==
Year	Play	Role	Notes	Ref.
1994	Defend and Defend and Defend			
2010	I Love You			
2010	King Lear	King Lear		
2013	Sendoff			
2014	The Tempest	Prospero		
2015	Prince Yeonseon, the Problematic Figure	Yeonguijeong		
2015	Fathers and Sons	Vasily		
2016	Seagull			
2017	How Cheon Deok-gu Lives			
2017	King Lear	King Lear		
2022	Last Session			
2022	Love Letter	Andy		

== Accolades ==
=== Awards ===
Award-giving body	Year	Category	Nominee/work	Result	Ref.
APAN Star Awards	2022	Excellence Award, Actor in an OTT Drama	Squid Game	Nominated	
Baeksang Arts Awards	1994	Best Actor (Theater)	Pigojigo Pigojigo (피고지고 피고지고)	Won	
Dong-A Theatre Awards	1979	Best Actor	Crime on Goat Island (백양섬의 욕망)	Won	
Director's Cut Awards	2022	Best New Actor in series	Squid Game (오징어 게임)	Nominated	
Gold Derby Awards	2022	Best Drama Supporting Actor	Squid Game (오징어 게임)	Nominated	
Golden Globe Awards	2022	Best Supporting Actor – Series, Miniseries or Television Film	Squid Game (오징어 게임)	Won	
National Theater Association Of Korea	2000	Best Actor	Abi (아비)	Won	
Primetime Emmy Awards	2022	Outstanding Supporting Actor in a Drama Series	Squid Game	Nominated	
Seoul Theater Festival	2006	Best Actor	Jangpan (장판)	Won	

=== State honors ===
Country or organization	Year	Honor	Ref.
South Korea	2019	Order of Cultural Merit (Hwagwan, 5th Class)	

=== Listicles ===
Name of publisher, year listed, name of listicle, and placement
Publisher	Year	Listicle	Placement	Ref.
Gold House	2022	A100 List (with Squid Games Creator & Stars)	Included	

== See also ==
- Late Blossom (2011)—A film adaptation of the play I Love You (2010) that O was in.
