= Biseokchigi =

Traditional Korean game

Biseokchigi (Korean: 비석치기) is a category of traditional Korean games involving the skillful throwing or kicking of rocks.

There are a wide variety of regional names for the game, including biseokchagi (비석차기), biseokkagi (비석까기), mogjakkagi (목자까기), jakkagi (자까기), bisasaeggi (비사색기), and more.

== Origin ==
Biseokchigi is a game with a long history, but it is difficult to find a record of its origin—thus the various names by which it is known in different areas—giving that it is only required to play a few flat stones and an open space or yard. However, according to the origins of the oral tradition, the background of this game reflects the late Joseon era. There are many places called Monument Streets all over the country, and this is a place name given to the monuments standing side by side.

== How to play ==
How the game is played differs depending on the region.

1. Draw two long lines separated by 4 to 5 meters.
2. Each person prepares a palm-sized stone then each captain or player, if they are not playing in teams, uses a rock-paper-scissors to decide who will attack first.
3. The losing team must place the stone vertically on the previously drawn line while the winners throw their stones trying to knock down the rival's. There are several stages of biseokchigi, as you can simply throw the rock while standing or carry it with your shoulder, head, feet or even your armpit and drop it off.
4. If the opponent's stone cannot be knocked down or is missed while moving, the attacker will change.
5. The person or team who has passed the whole process and whose stone remains standing wins.
